= Helena Valley (disambiguation) =

Helena Valley is a suburb of Perth, Western Australia.

Helena Valley may also refer to:

== United States ==
=== Census-designated places ===
- Helena Valley Northwest, Montana
- Helena Valley Northeast, Montana
- Helena Valley Southeast, Montana
- Helena Valley West Central, Montana

=== Geographic areas ===
- Helena Valley (Montana), valley encompassing the city of Helena, Montana and other communities
- Helena Valley Reservoir, reservoir located outside of Helena
