= Unionville, Montana =

Unincorporated community in Montana, United States

- Unincorporated community
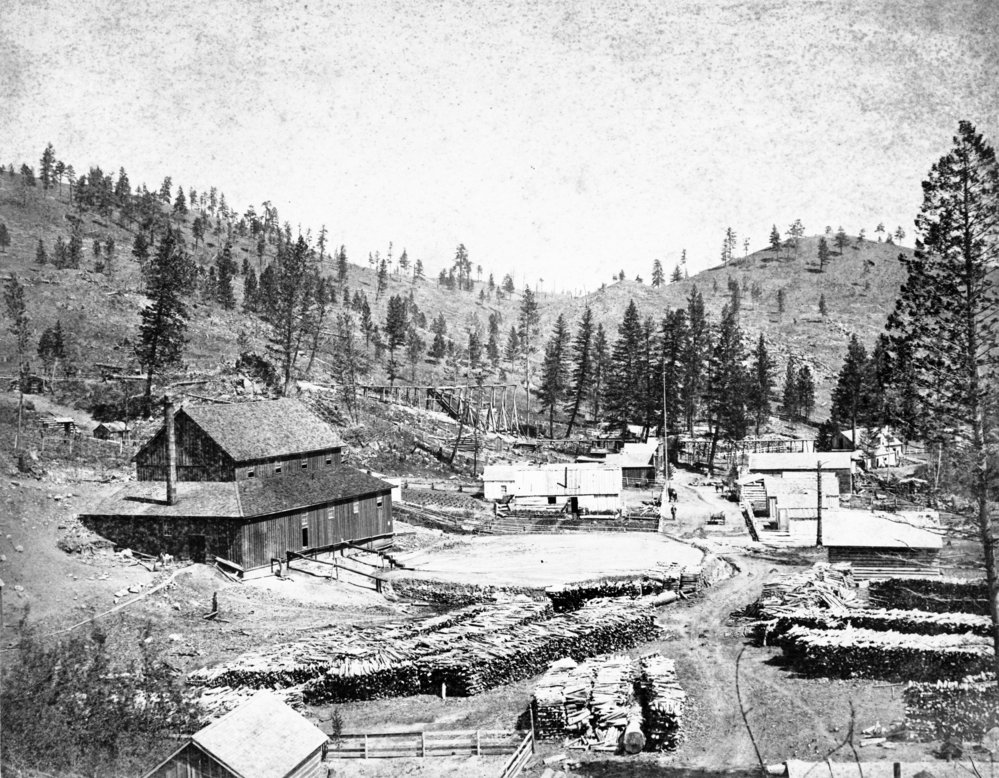
- Unionville, circa 1868

- Location within Montana Location within the United States
- Coordinates: 46°32′44″N 112°04′48″W
- Country: United States
- State: Montana
- County: Lewis and Clark

Area
  - Total: 1.29 sq mi (3.33 km^{2})
  - Land: 1.28 sq mi (3.32 km^{2})
  - Water: 0.0039 sq mi (0.01 km^{2})
- Elevation: 4,862 ft (1,482 m)

Population (2020)
  - Total: 206
  - Density: 160.8/sq mi (62.09/km^{2})
- Time zone: UTC-7 (Mountain (MST))
  - Summer (DST): UTC-6 (MDT)
- Area code: 406
- GNIS feature ID: 2804304

Unionville is an unincorporated community in Lewis and Clark County, Montana, United States, four miles south of Helena and approximately two miles west of Jefferson City and accessible from Oro Fino Gulch Drive. Unionville is part of the Helena micropolitan area.

== History ==
Unionville was the camp for the Whitlatch-Union Mine, which operated from 1864 to 1872, and again from 1905 to 1942. It yielded over 17,000 ounces of gold, over 8,000 ounces of silver, nine tons of copper, nine tons of zinc and 40 tons of lead.

The town maintained its own identity even though it was just a stone's throw from the state capitol. Although the gold that made the town independently wealthy may be gone, reminders of Unionville's rich history remain there today. Unionville was also the site of one of the first movies ever shot on location in Montana. The movie "The Growler Girl" was shot there in 1926.

Despite the closure of the mine, the community remained relatively active up through the 1950s and today many old historic buildings remain intact and have been preserved. The town is easy to reach for visitors being situated a short distance from Helena. In spite of a number of abandoned older buildings, it is still inhabited by many longtime and newer residents.

== Education ==
Helena Elementary School District and Helena High School District are the respective school districts.
