= Mike Horse, Montana =

Extinct human settlement in United States of America

Coordinates: 47°01′35″N 112°21′38″W

Mike Horse is an extinct town in Lewis and Clark County, Montana, United States.

A post office called Mike Horse was established in 1943, and remained in operation until 1952. According to tradition, "Mike", a miner's horse, accidentally discovered a valuable deposit of ore near the original site of this mining settlement.
