= David Fuller (politician) =

American politician (1941–2022)

David Edward Fuller (July 28, 1941 – February 5, 2022) was an American politician from Montana.

== Biography ==
Fuller was born in Helena, Montana, and graduated from Helena Senior High School. He attended the University of Montana. Fuller served on the Lewis and Clark County Commission and was a Democrat. He also served in the Montana Senate from 1983 to 1987.

He died in Helena, on February 5, 2022, at age 80, with COVID-19 related symptoms.
