= Milford Colony, Montana =

- Census-designated place
- Location within Montana Location within the United States
- Coordinates: 47°19′41″N 112°12′46″W
- Country: United States
- State: Montana
- County: Lewis and Clark

Area
  - Total: 0.45 sq mi (1.16 km^{2})
  - Land: 0.44 sq mi (1.15 km^{2})
  - Water: 0.0039 sq mi (0.01 km^{2})
- Elevation: 4,216 ft (1,285 m)

Population (2020)
  - Total: 2
  - Density: 4.5/sq mi (1.74/km^{2})
- Time zone: UTC-7 (Mountain (MST))
  - Summer (DST): UTC-6 (MDT)
- ZIP Codes: 59648 (Wolf Creek); 59410 (Augusta)
- Area code: 406
- FIPS code: 30-49600
- GNIS feature ID: 2804302

Milford Colony is a Hutterite community and census-designated place (CDP) in Lewis and Clark County, Montana, United States. It is in the northeast part of the county, along U.S. Route 287, 15 miles (24 km) southeast of Augusta and 24 miles (39 km) north of Interstate 15 near Wolf Creek.

The community is in the valley of Flat Creek, an east-flowing tributary of the Dearborn River, which runs southeast to the Missouri River.

Milford Colony was first listed as a CDP prior to the 2020 census. As of the 2020 census, Milford Colony had a population of 2.

== Demographics ==
Historical population
Census	Pop.	Note	%±
2020	2		—
U.S. Decennial Census

== Education ==
The respective school districts are Auchard Creek Elementary School District and Augusta High School District.
