= Basin, Montana =

- Census-designated place
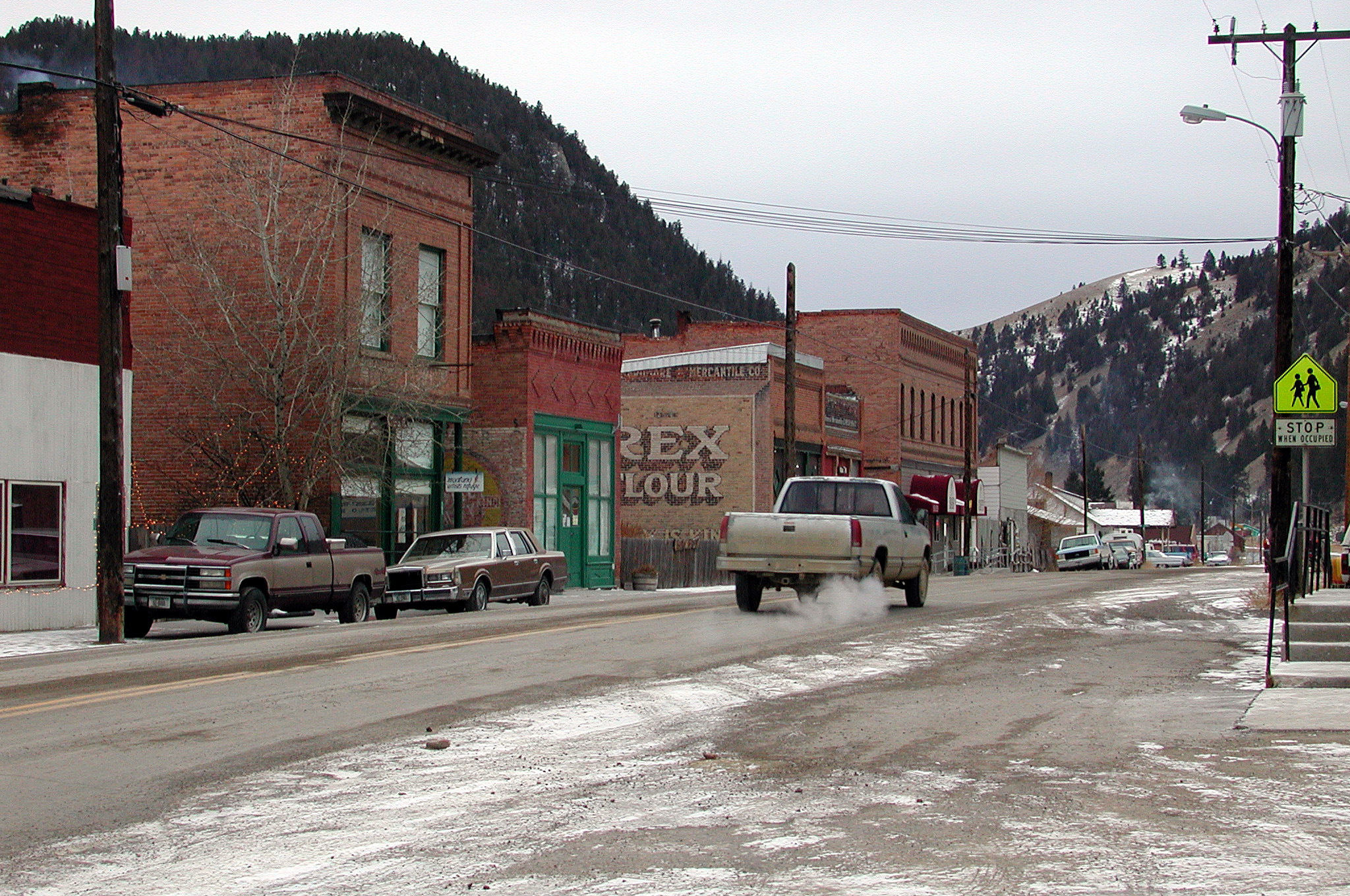
- Basin Street

- Location of Basin, Montana
- Coordinates: 46°16′17″N 112°15′49″W
- Country: United States
- State: Montana
- County: Jefferson

Area
  - Total: 12.71 sq mi (32.92 km^{2})
  - Land: 12.71 sq mi (32.92 km^{2})
  - Water: 0 sq mi (0.00 km^{2}) 0%
- Elevation: 5,364 ft (1,635 m)

Population (2020)
  - Total: 199
  - Density: 15.6/sq mi (6.04/km^{2})
- Time zone: UTC−7 (MST)
  - Summer (DST): UTC−6 (MDT)
- ZIP code: 59631
- Area code: 406
- FIPS code: 30-04150
- GNIS feature ID: 0800393
- Website: www.legendsofamerica.com/mt-basin.html

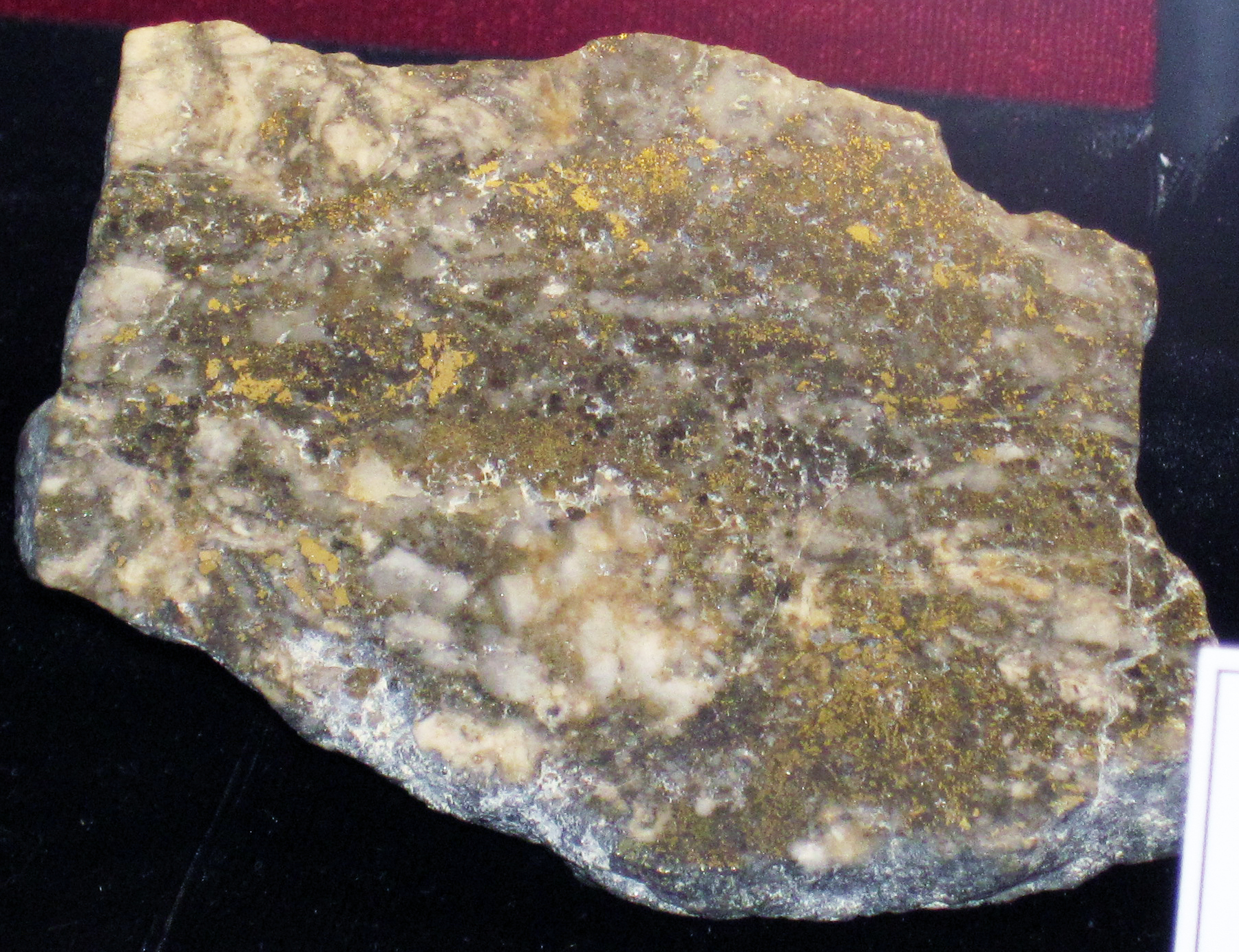
Gold and quartz specimen from the Jib Mine in Basin

Basin is an unincorporated community and census-designated place (CDP) in Jefferson County, Montana, United States. It lies approximately 10 miles (16 km) southeast of the Continental Divide in a high narrow canyon along Interstate 15 about halfway between Butte and Helena. Basin Creek flows roughly north to south through Basin and enters the Boulder River on the settlement's south side. As of the 2020 census, Basin had a population of 199.

Archaeologists have discovered evidence of human habitation from 10,000 years ago at a site near Clancy, 20 miles (32 km) northeast of Basin. From about 2000 BCE through the mid-19th century, nomadic tribes hunted bison in the grassy valleys that trend east, away from the Rocky Mountains and into the plains. By the time miners found gold in the streams in and near Basin, most of these tribes of Indians had been forced onto reservations by the U.S. government.

Basin rests above the Boulder Batholith, the host rock for many valuable mineral ores found in this part of Montana. After the town became a hub of gold and silver mining, Basin's population peaked at about 1,500 in the first decade of the 20th century but gradually declined as the mines were depleted. Abandoned mining equipment, closed or barricaded mine portals, and the ruins of a smelter and ore concentrator remain in Basin in the 21st century.

Historic buildings from Basin's heyday form much of the core of the CDP's small business district, which includes a fire station, a post office, two restaurants, a bar, a commercial gallery, and small specialty shops. Basin has a small elementary school, its own water system, and a low-power radio station. Local volunteers and elected trustees provide limited services to the settlement, but it relies on the government of Jefferson County for law enforcement and other services. From 1993 through 2011, Basin was home to the Montana Artists Refuge.

== Geography and geology ==
Basin, in Jefferson County, is part of the Helena Micropolitan Statistical Area. It lies at an elevation of 5,364 feet (1,635 m) above sea level along Interstate 15 about 30 miles (48 km) by road north of Butte and 38 miles (61 km) south of Helena in a narrow canyon. The community is largely surrounded by the Beaverhead-Deerlodge National Forest. Basin Creek flows south through the center of Basin to its confluence with a larger stream, the Boulder River, which flows east along the south side of Basin. No paved roads except the interstate highway, which runs along the river canyon, connect Basin to other towns. About 10 miles (16 km) upstream on Basin Creek lies the Continental Divide. According to the United States Census Bureau, the CDP has a total area of 12.7 square miles (33.0 km^{2}), all land.

In the late Cretaceous (roughly 81 to 74 million years ago), molten rock (magma) rose to the Earth's surface in and near what later became Jefferson County and eventually formed an intrusive body of granitic rock up to 10 miles (16 km) thick and 100 miles (161 km) in diameter. This body, known as the Boulder Batholith, extends from Helena to Butte, and is the host rock for the many valuable ores mined in the region. As the granite cooled, it cracked, and hot solutions infiltrated the cracks to form mineral veins bearing gold and other metals. Millions of years later, weathering allowed gold in the veins to wash down to the gravels in Basin Creek, Cataract Creek, and the other creeks near Basin, as well as the Boulder River.

The Basin area is underlain by the quartz monzonite of the Boulder Batholith. The batholith is overlain by dacite from the Paleogene and Neogene periods (roughly 66 million to 1.8 million years ago) and andesite from the late Cretaceous. The andesite and monzonite are cut by dikes of dacite and rhyolite.

== History ==
=== First peoples ===
Archeologists think it likely that the first people to live in Montana crossed from Asia to North America over the Bering Land Bridge that existed during the last major Ice Age about 12,000 years ago. Because the middle of the continent was covered with sheets of ice, people who migrated south did so on trails along the edges of glaciers melted by seasonal warming. One such trail, called the Great North Trail, is thought to have followed the Rocky Mountain Front into Montana, passing close to Helena, 24 miles (39 km) north of Basin, and continuing into the east-central part of the state. Evidence of these early Paleo-Indians or Clovis people has been found at three sites, one of them the McHaffie site near Clancy about 20 miles (32 km) north of Basin. The age of the Clancy artifacts is estimated to be 10,000 years. The Clovis people are thought to have disappeared in about 4,000 to 5,000 BCE when the Montana climate became more dry and would not support the animal populations the Clovis needed to survive.

About 2,000 years ago, a new prehistoric people known as the Late Hunters appeared in Montana, thriving on a bison (buffalo) population living in open grassy areas on the plains and in river valleys. The earliest tribes are thought to have been the Kootenai, who stayed west of the Continental Divide, and the Flathead (Salish), and Pend d'Oreilles, who ventured east of the mountains into and east of the Three Forks country, 46 miles (74 km) southeast of Basin. In the 17th century, the Crow entered Montana from the east and the Shoshone from the south. Pressed by other tribes retreating west from white European settlers, the Blackfeet moved into Montana around 1730. Acquiring horses and firearms, and numbering about 15,000, they formed alliances with other incoming tribes, the Assiniboine and the Gros Ventres, and by the mid-18th century dominated the state. When the white explorers Lewis and Clark traveled up the Missouri River to Three Forks, they found only Blackfeet and Blackfeet allies. Heavily dependent on bison, the nomadic life of the Blackfeet "came to an abrupt end in the early 1880s when the buffalo became almost extinct."

During the 1870s, a few years after the first white miners began looking for gold near Basin, the last large-scale battles between the U.S. government and the Indians took place in Montana. The Marias Massacre (also known as the Baker Massacre), occurred in 1870 about 150 miles (241 km) northeast of Basin. Others, the Battle of the Little Bighorn and the Battle of the Rosebud, were fought in 1876 about 250 miles (402 km) from Basin in the southeastern part of the state. By then, most first peoples had been moved to reservations, which were far from Basin.

=== Camp ===
The town of Basin began as a 19th century mining camp near the confluence of Basin Creek with the Boulder River. Gold deposits at the mouth of Cataract Creek, about 0.5 miles (0.8 km) downstream of Basin were reported as early as 1862. Prospectors staked claims and built cabins, and within a few years placer mining extended the full lengths of Cataract and Basin Creeks. When a settlement was established in Basin, the buildings at the mouth of Cataract Creek were gradually moved to Basin, and the Cataract camp was abandoned.

Searches for the lode veins on both creeks succeeded by the 1870s and eventually led to significant lode mining at the Eva May, Uncle Sam, Grey Eagle, Hattie Ferguson, and Comet mines in the Cataract Creek district and the Bullion, Hope, and Katy mines in the Basin Creek district. By 1880, the settlement at Basin became the local source of supplies for mines and miners.

=== Boom and bust ===
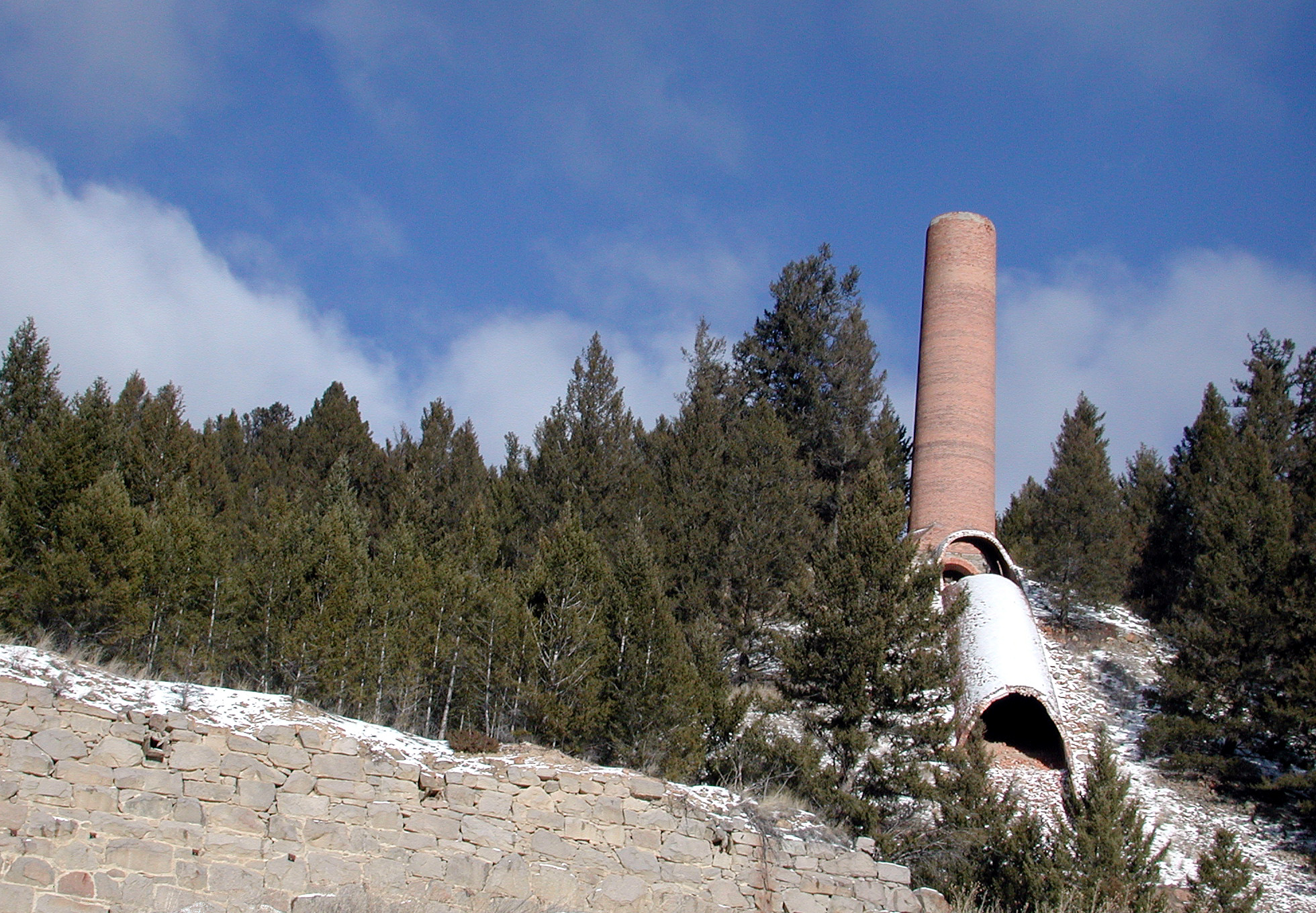
Ruins of the Glass brothers' smelter in Basin (2007)

Two mines, the Katy and the Hope, owned serially by several different companies between the mid-1890s and the mid-1920s, contributed to Basin's prosperity. In 1894, the Basin and Bay State Mining Company, organized by two brothers named Glass, began expanded operations at these mines. However, flooding and fires caused both mines to close by 1896; the Glass brothers lost control of the property, and the mines went idle. Despite the ups and downs of the local mines and despite several disastrous fires in town, Basin prospered. In 1905, the Basin Reduction Company led by F. Augustus Heinze, who owned mines in Butte, took over the properties left by the Glass brothers and improved them. By then, Basin had a population of 1,500, four rooming houses, a drug store, three hotels, a bath house, three grocery stores, a bank, a newspaper, and 12 saloons.

An unpublished manuscript on file with the Montana State Historical Society describes life in Basin between 1906 and 1910 in great detail. Two railroads, the Northern Pacific on the north side of the Boulder River, and the Great Northern on the south side, served the city; both had depots and warehouses in Basin and carried passengers as well as freight. The Glass brothers' smelter had been set up on the north side to process concentrated ore delivered by rail from out of town or from the mills on the south side. Infrastructure included a weight scale for ore cars and an overhead tram to carry ore across the river from the reduction mill to the smelter. Although the smelter was a "massive unit" equipped with furnaces, conveyors, and machinery ready for operation, it "never turned a wheel".

While the smelter sat idle, mining activity continued on the south side of the river in the Hope-Katy mine complex, at the Hope Mill, which crushed and separated ore, and at the Basin Reduction Works. Flumes carried water from upstream on Cataract Creek and Basin Creek to a storage reservoir in town and supplied water to the mills as well as the town's fire hydrants. A separate flume carried water to the mills from upstream on the Boulder River. At the Basin Reduction Works, Corliss steam engines, driven by the coal-fired boilers, provided power to run the mine hoists and the mill machinery, and an electric generator powered by a water wheel made electricity for factory lights and the arc lights at Basin's street intersections. Surplus tailings were discharged into the river and into a dam built for the purpose downstream of Basin.

In addition to homes, Basin structures between 1906 and 1910 included a dance pavilion, a grandstand, a baseball diamond, and a playground near the confluence of Basin Creek with the river. A footbridge connected the playground with a picnic area on the south side of the river. Meeting places included churches, a union hall, and a two-story building shared by the Fraternal Order of Eagles, the Independent Order of Odd Fellows, the Masons, and Eastern Star. Among the town's businesses were a hardware store, a bakery, livery stables, several "units of harlotry", a blacksmith shop, a brewery specializing in Basin Beer, a sawmill, and a dairy barn from which "milk was delivered in five-pound buckets", sometimes with covers.

In 1909, after Heinze abandoned his properties in Basin, the Butte and Superior Mining Company used buildings and machinery at the site of the Basin Reduction Works to treat zinc ore by a new process called froth flotation. Sued for patent infringement, the company shut down its Basin plant in 1912. Max Atwater, a mining engineer who had worked for Butte and Superior, obtained a license for the process and ran a smaller zinc-extraction plant in Basin from 1914 through 1918. His wife, Mary Meigs Atwater, described Basin as "a mining camp, subject to recurring periods of boom and bust... A tiny telephone office and a drugstore died with the end of our era of boom... Just above the town were the headframe of our mine, and the old mill, and the never-quite-finished skeleton of a projected smelter."

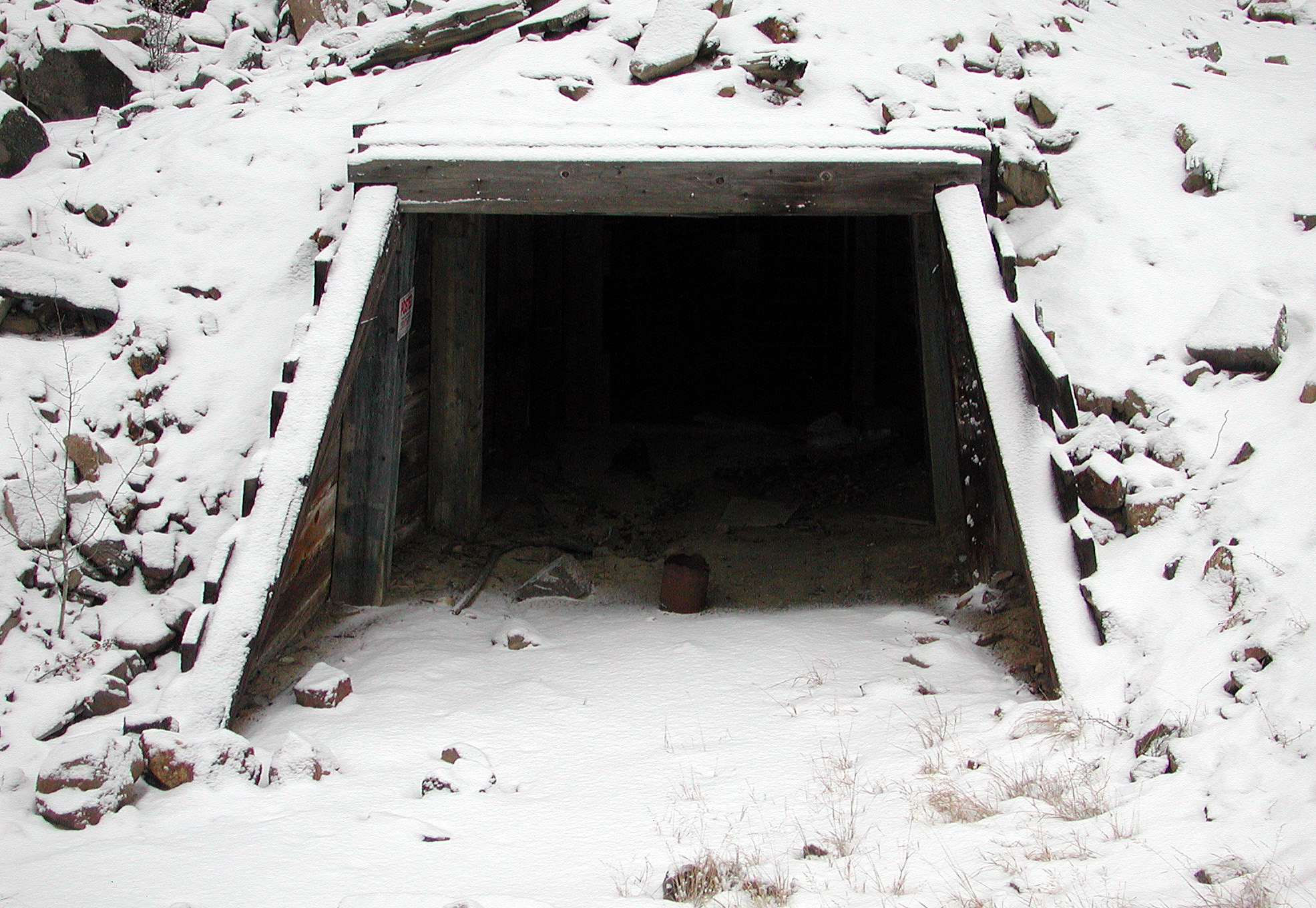
Former entrance to the Hope-Katy mine complex (2007)

The most extensive and successful mining of the Hope-Katy vein began in 1919, when the Jib Consolidated Mining Company began work on the property. When this company acquired the mines, they comprised 3,500 feet (1,067 m) of workings. Over the next five years, Jib expanded these to more than 15,000 feet (4,572 m), and in 1924 the company became the largest gold producer in Montana. In that year, the combined Jib mines produced about 33,000 ounces (940,000 g) of gold, 182,000 ounces (5,200,000 g) of silver, 282,000 pounds (128,000 kg) of copper, and 199,000 pounds (90,000 kg) of lead. In 1925, however, the Jib properties passed from the mining company to trustees for creditors, and production declined. This was the last of Basin's mining booms. Since then, small-scale mining, reworking of old mine dumps, and placer mining has continued in the region.

=== Since 1960 ===
For about 50 years, the Merry Widow Health Mine in Basin and similar mines nearby have attracted people seeking relief from health problems such as arthritis through limited exposure to radioactive mine water and radon. The practice is controversial because of the "well-documented ill effects of high-dose radiation on the body."

In 1975, the Basin community formed water and sewer districts and, using federal grants to cover about 60 percent of the costs, built a water delivery, sewage, and waste-handling system. By 1990, Interstate 15 had replaced the entire length of U.S. Route 91 in the state. The centerline of the Interstate followed the track of the former Great Northern Railway through town.

In 1999, the Environmental Protection Agency added the Basin mining area to the Superfund National Priorities List because of mining-waste problems in and near town. The mining area comprised the watersheds of Basin and Cataract Creek and part of the Boulder River. Contaminants included arsenic, copper, cadmium, lead and other metals. Cleanup of the mining wastes at the Buckeye-Enterprise, Crystal and Bullion mines in the Basin Creek and Cataract watersheds was completed in 2002, and the removal of mine waste from Basin was completed in 2004.

=== Individual mines ===
Almost opposite the Hope-Katy complex on the south side of the Boulder River in Basin was the Katy Extension Mine on the north side. It produced ore from part of the Hope-Katy lode that had been displaced about 800 feet (240 m) to the north by faulting. Other mines within 2 miles (3 km) of Basin included the Lotta, 1 mile (1.6 km) west of town along the route of Interstate 15; the Basin Bell (Latsch), about 1.5 miles (2.4 km) north of town along Basin Creek; the Boulder, 1.5 miles (2.4 km) northeast of Basin on the south slope of Pole Mountain; the Mantle and South Mantle, about 1.5 miles (2.4 km) north of town along Cataract Creek; and the Obelisk, 1.5 miles (2.4 km) east of town near the road that later became Interstate 15.

== Climate ==
July and August are typically the warmest months in Boulder, approximately 9 miles (14 km) east of Basin, while December and January are the coldest. May and June are the wettest months, when a total of about 4 inches (100 mm) of precipitation falls. Weather observations were recorded in Basin from June 1949 to November 1970, but only contained precipitation and snowfall data.

Climate data for Boulder, Montana (1949–2015)
Month	Jan	Feb	Mar	Apr	May	Jun	Jul	Aug	Sep	Oct	Nov	Dec	Year
Mean daily maximum °F (°C)	34 (1)	39 (4)	45 (7)	55 (13)	64 (18)	73 (23)	83 (28)	82 (28)	71 (22)	59 (15)	43 (6)	35 (2)	57 (14)
Mean daily minimum °F (°C)	10 (−12)	14 (−10)	19 (−7)	27 (−3)	35 (2)	43 (6)	48 (9)	46 (8)	37 (3)	28 (−2)	18 (−8)	11 (−12)	28 (−2)
Source: National Centers for Environmental Information

Climate data for Basin, Montana (1949–1970)
Month	Jan	Feb	Mar	Apr	May	Jun	Jul	Aug	Sep	Oct	Nov	Dec	Year
Average precipitation inches (mm)	1.00 (25)	0.58 (15)	0.76 (19)	1.00 (25)	1.78 (45)	2.46 (62)	1.36 (35)	1.27 (32)	1.03 (26)	0.80 (20)	0.75 (19)	0.77 (20)	13.56 (343)
Average snowfall inches (cm)	10.68 (27.1)	8.05 (20.4)	10.23 (26.0)	7.15 (18.2)	0.71 (1.8)	0.25 (0.64)	0.12 (0.30)	0 (0)	0.89 (2.3)	2.57 (6.5)	7.55 (19.2)	8.68 (22.0)	56.88 (144.44)
Source: National Centers for Environmental Information

== Demographics ==
Historical population
Census	Pop.	Note	%±
1900	600		—
1910	650		8.3%
1920	420		−35.4%
1930	355		−15.5%
1940	315		−11.3%
1950	300		−4.8%
1960	280		−6.7%
1970	230		−17.9%
1980	175		−23.9%
1990	200		14.3%
2000	255		27.5%
2010	212		−16.9%
2020	199		−6.1%
Census sources 1900−1990; 2000−2020

As of the census of 2000, there were 255 people, 113 households, and 69 families residing in the CDP. The population density was about 20 people per square mile (8/km^{2}). The CDP contained 146 housing units. Basin's racial makeup was about 95% White, 2% Native American, and about 4% other. Hispanic or Latino persons of any race were 2% of the population. The population decreased to 212 by 2010 and to 199 as of the census of 2020.

In 2000, 29% of the households included children under the age of 18; 51% were married couples living together, 5% had a female householder with no husband present, and 39% were non-families. 33% of all households were made up of individuals, and 6% had someone living alone who was 65 years of age or older. The average household size was 2.26 and the average family size was 2.93.

The population was spread out in 2000, with 27% under the age of 18, 5% from 18 to 24, 29% from 25 to 44, 31% from 45 to 64, and 8% who were 65 years of age or older. The median age was 38 years. For every 100 females there were 95 males.

The median income for a household in 2000 for the CDP was $22,500, and the median income for a family was about $30,000. Males had a median income of $26,000 versus $16,000 for females. The per capita income for the CDP was $12,000. About 23% of families and 33% of the population were below the poverty line, including 56% of those under the age of 18 and 17% of those 65 or over. By 2020, the median household income had risen to $49,000.

== Arts and culture ==
In 1993, a group of professional artists established the Montana Artists Refuge in Basin. The nonprofit organization offered artist residencies in two historic buildings, a former bank and meeting hall and a former dry goods store converted to apartment and studio space. The organization sponsored annual art events including the American Indian Artists Symposium and the Basin City Jazz Art Experience, held in the Basin Community Hall. All types of artists, including potters, painters, musicians, dancers, singers, weavers, and writers, had residencies in Basin. The refuge closed in October 2011.

== Education, business, and government ==
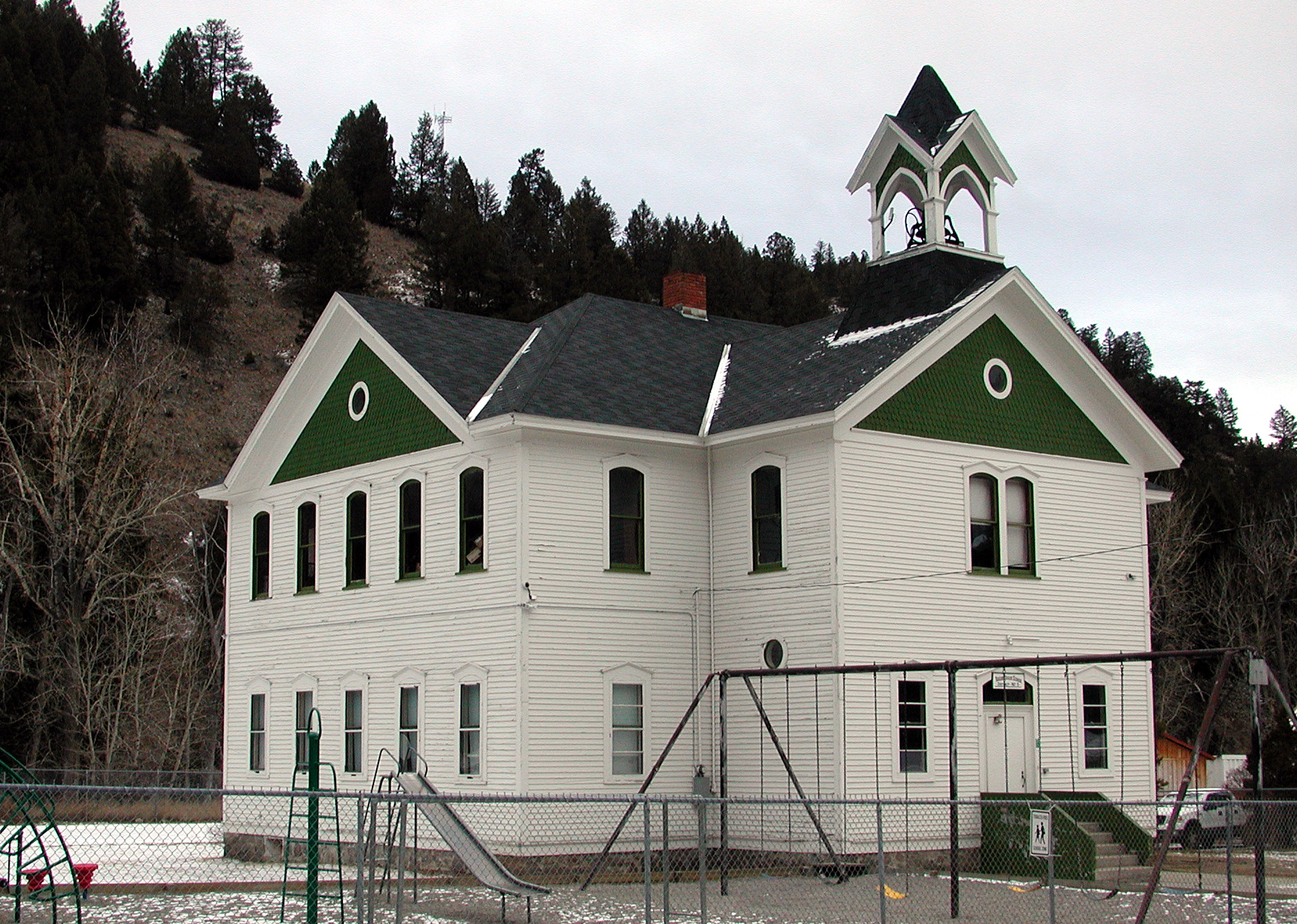
Basin School in 2007. The school was built in about 1895.

The school districts for the community are Basin Elementary School District and Jefferson High School District A public elementary school, Basin Grade School, serves about 20 students, pre-kindergarten through sixth grade. Older students attend school in Boulder.

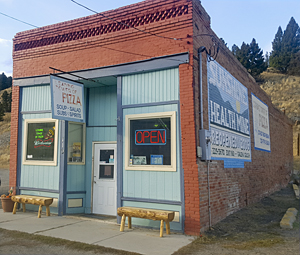
Basin, Montana

The town's small business district includes a bar, two restaurants, a traveler's inn, a wellness center, small specialty shops, and a pottery gallery. A low-power radio station, KBAS-LP, 98.3 FM, owned by Jefferson County Disaster and Emergency Services, broadcasts from Basin.

County, state, and federal agencies provide most of the government services available in Basin. Local residents serve as elected trustees of the Basin Fire District and its volunteer fire department. Elected trustees also oversee the Basin Water and Sewer District. The Jefferson County sheriff's department provides law enforcement, and other county departments offer trash removal and recycling, emergency management services, and road maintenance. The county health department has a clinic in Boulder, 9 miles (14 km) east of Basin, and the county courthouse, district court, and the nearest branch of the county library are also in Boulder. The United States Postal Service has a post office in Basin.
