= Craig, Montana =

Unincorporated community in Montana, United States

- Census-designated place
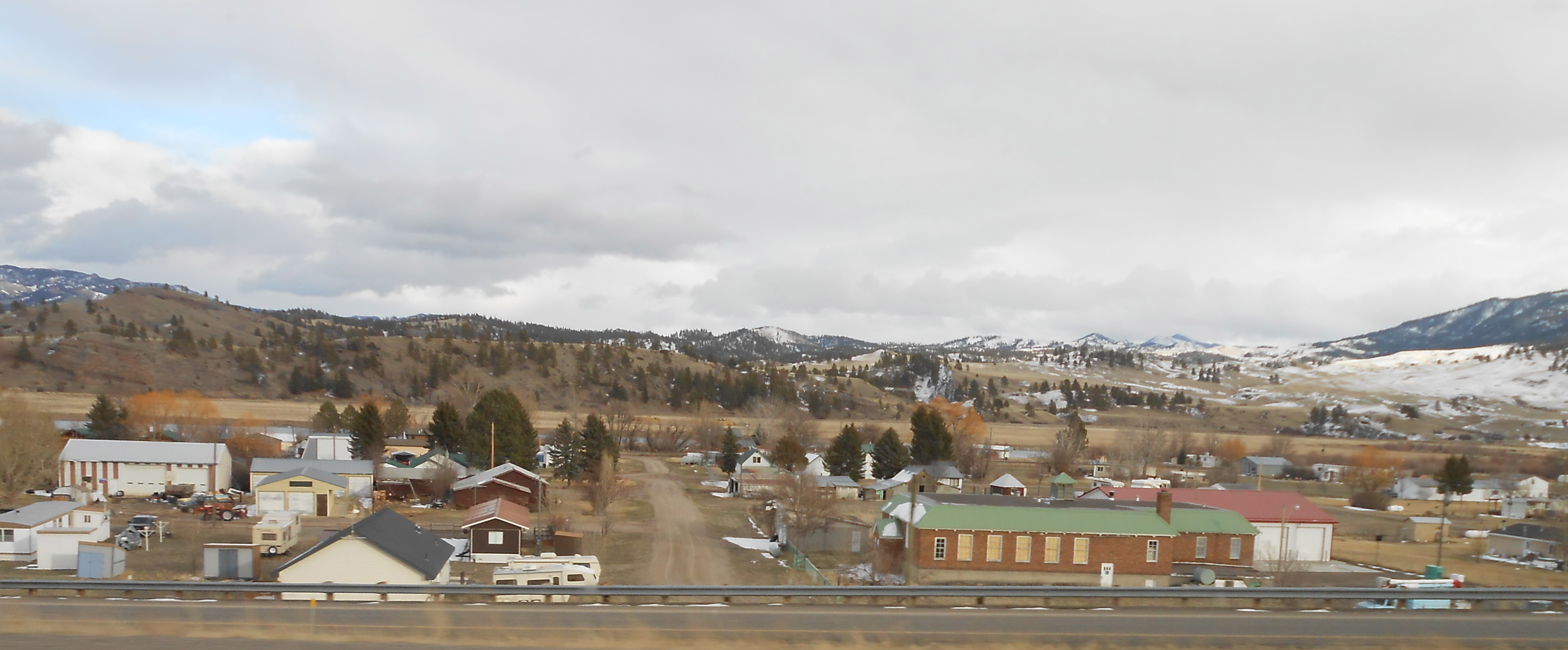
- Craig, Montana

- Location within Montana Location within the United States
- Coordinates: 47°04′28″N 111°57′52″W
- Country: United States
- State: Montana
- County: Lewis and Clark

Area
  - Total: 0.36 sq mi (0.93 km^{2})
  - Land: 0.30 sq mi (0.77 km^{2})
  - Water: 0.058 sq mi (0.15 km^{2})
- Elevation: 3,461 ft (1,055 m)

Population (2020)
  - Total: 39
  - Density: 130.6/sq mi (50.43/km^{2})
- Time zone: UTC-7 (Mountain (MST))
  - Summer (DST): UTC-6 (MDT)
- Area code: 406
- GNIS feature ID: 2583802
- FIPS code: 30-18025

Craig is an unincorporated community and census-designated place (CDP) in Lewis and Clark County, Montana, United States. As of the 2020 census, Craig had a population of 39. Craig is located along Interstate 15 on the west side of the Missouri River, 43 miles (69 km) north of Helena, the state capital, and 47 miles (76 km) southwest of Great Falls.

According to the U.S. Census Bureau, the Craig CDP has a total area of 0.30 square miles (0.77 km^{2}), of which 0.25 acres (1,010 m^{2}), or 0.13%, are water.

== Demographics ==
Historical population
Census	Pop.	Note	%±
2020	39		—
U.S. Decennial Census

== Education ==
Craig is located in the Wolf Creek Elementary School District and the Helena High School District.

Additionally, Cascade Public Schools of Cascade states that it has some students from the Craig, Ulm, and Wolf Creek areas.

== Media ==
The Cascade Courier is a local newspaper. It is printed weekly and is also available online.

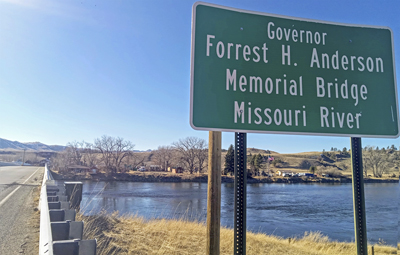
Craig Montana Missouri river Governor Forrest H Anderson memorial bridge

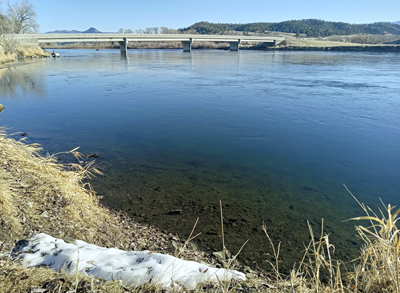
Craig Montana Missouri river Governor Forrest H Anderson memorial bridge

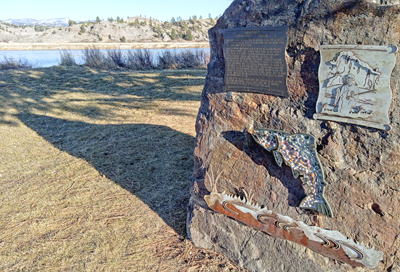
Craig Montana Missouri river Governor Forrest H Anderson fishing access memorial

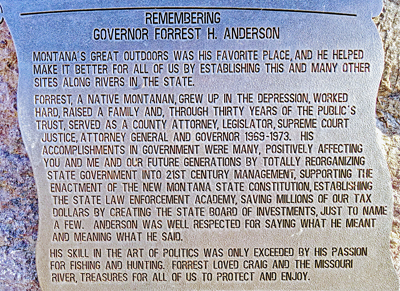
Craig Montana Missouri river Governor Forrest H Anderson fishing access memorial

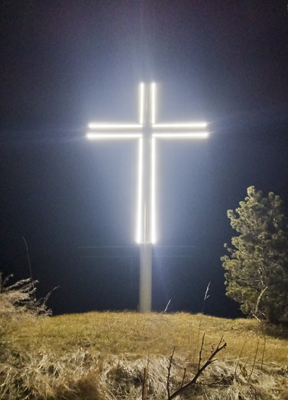
Craig Montana Cemetery

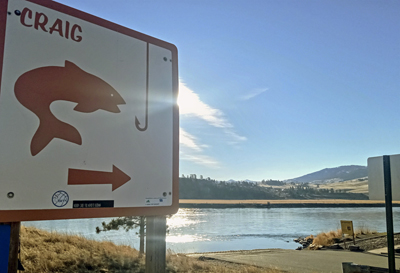
Craig Montana fishing access Missouri river
