= Rimini, Montana =

- Ghost town
- Location within Montana Location within the United States
- Coordinates: 46°29′17″N 112°14′48″W
- State: Montana
- County: Lewis and Clark County
- Founded: 1864

Area
  - Total: 0.31 sq mi (0.79 km^{2})
  - Land: 0.31 sq mi (0.79 km^{2})
  - Water: 0 sq mi (0.00 km^{2})
- Elevation: 5,285 ft (1,611 m)

Population (2020)
  - Total: 51
  - Density: 167.6/sq mi (64.72/km^{2})
- Time zone: UTC-7 (MST)
  - Summer (DST): UTC-6 (MDT)
- Area code: 406
- FIPS code: 30-62650

Rimini, (/ˈrɪmənaɪ/) is a ghost town in Lewis and Clark County, Montana, United States. It is one of the oldest mining districts in the state. It was established when silver lodes were discovered in 1864. Other names for the district were Lewis and Clark, Tenmile, Vaughn, Colorado, and Bear Gulch. It was the site of Camp Rimini.

Historical population
Census	Pop.	Note	%±
2020	51		—
U.S. Decennial Census

== History ==
The town, settled in the late 1860s by Irish miners, was at first called Young Ireland. When residents petitioned Governor Schuyler Crosby for a post office in 1883, they were told that the Post Office department disapproved of two-word names. Instead Crosby agreed to register the town as Rimini, from a play about Francesca da Rimini that he had just seen.

At its peak in 1890, Rimini's population was about 300 people. The town had "several hotels and stores; a school; saloons, gambling houses and pool halls; livery stable; physician's office; church; several boarding houses; and a sawmill."

As of 2012, there are only "a few full time residents," with part-time residents arriving during the summer.

== War dog training at Camp Rimini ==
Camp Rimini, Montana trained sled and pack dogs for use as war dogs in World War II. Between 1942 and 1944, 263 sled dogs and 268 pack dogs were trained. The facility was run by the Quartermaster Corps, which was responsible for running the Army's K-9 Corps.

== Mining district and Superfund site ==
The Montana Department of Environmental Quality describes the Rimini Mining District as follows:

The Rimini district is about 13 miles west of Helena on the east side of the Continental Divide at the terminal point of a branch of the Northern Pacific Railroad. It is on Tenmile Creek with Red Mountain on the east and Lee Mountain on the west. It is probably the oldest lead-zinc camp in Montana ...

The Lee Mountain Lode was discovered in 1864 and the Eureka Mine in 1865. However, little mining occurred until 1885 when the Northern Pacific spurline was constructed to the district. During the 1880s a number of mines were developed with the most productive ones being the East Pacific, Lady Washington, John McGraw, Eureka and Porphery Dike. Some of these mines were opened to depths of up to 500 or 600 ft. One of the deepest, the Lee Mountain, has produced more than $1.5 million and the Valley Forge, which is 325 ft deep, has produced more than $200,000. The district shipped 400 tons of ore per week in 1891 with most of the ore being sent to the smelter at Wickes.

According to the Environmental Protection Agency, "the small historic mining community of Rimini is located within the Superfund site boundaries" of the Upper Tenmile Creek Mining Area.

EPA added the Upper Tenmile Creek Mining Area to the Superfund National Priorities List on October 22, 1999, due to mining waste problems in the 53-square-mile watershed ...

The Upper Tenmile Creek Mining Area site is located in the Rimini Mining District, southwest of Helena, Montana. It consists of numerous abandoned and inactive hard-rock mine sites that produced gold, lead, zinc and copper. Mining began in the district before 1870 and continued through the 1920s. Little mining has been performed there since the early 1930s ...

The site includes the drainage basin of Tenmile Creek upstream of the Helena water treatment plant and includes tributaries that supply water to the plant's five intake pipelines. EPA identified 150 individual mine sites within the watershed boundary, of which 70 have been prioritized for cleanup. Many of these mine features are above the five City of Helena drinking water intakes, which supply about 50 percent of the city's water.

The Susie Mine was one of the mines in the Upper Tenmile Creek Mining Area.

The Susie mine was a gold, silver, and lead mine, and has significantly high acid drainage polluted with arsenic and heavy metals. The drainage from this mine is a major source of the heavy metal contamination in streams that flow into the water sources for Helena, Montana.

The EPA made significant progress on the cleanup in Rimini in FY 2011:

- The main road through Rimini was completely excavated and backfilled to remediate contaminated material. Approximately 18,000 cubic yards of waste were removed from one mile of Rimini Road. Removal of this waste reduces the potential for residents to be exposed to contamination as well as prevents future erosion and distribution of wastes via the adjacent Tenmile Creek.
- Nearly all of the residential yards were remediated, with new septic systems installed and landscaping completed; four yards remain to be remediated. Approximately 6,000 cubic yards of waste were removed from the yards in Rimini and 9,000 cubic yards from the Lee Mountain site.

== Education ==
Helena Elementary School District and Helena High School District are the respective school districts.

== See also ==
Race to the Sky, a dog sled race to remember the dogs that trained at Camp Rimini.
