= Helena West Side, Montana =

- Census-designated place
- Location of Helena West Side, Montana
- Coordinates: 46°35′45″N 112°07′50″W
- Country: United States
- State: Montana
- County: Lewis and Clark

Area
  - Total: 15.31 sq mi (39.65 km^{2})
  - Land: 15.29 sq mi (39.59 km^{2})
  - Water: 0.023 sq mi (0.06 km^{2})
- Elevation: 4,111 ft (1,253 m)

Population (2020)
  - Total: 1,331
  - Density: 87.1/sq mi (33.62/km^{2})
- Time zone: UTC-7 (Mountain (MST))
  - Summer (DST): UTC-6 (MDT)
- Area code: 406
- FIPS code: 30-35640
- GNIS feature ID: 2408375

Helena West Side is a census-designated place (CDP) in Lewis and Clark County, Montana, United States. As of the 2020 census, Helena West Side had a population of 1,331. Annexation of part of the CDP by the city of Helena reduced the CDP's population in earlier counts. It is part of the Helena Micropolitan Statistical Area.

== Geography ==
Helena West Side is located in southern Lewis and Clark County. It is bordered to the east by the city of Helena and to the northeast by the Helena Valley West Central CDP. U.S. Route 12 runs through the community, leading east 3 miles (5 km) to downtown Helena and west over the Continental Divide 40 miles (64 km) to Interstate 90 at Garrison.

According to the United States Census Bureau, the CDP has a total area of 14.2 square miles (36.7 km^{2}), of which 0.02 square miles (0.06 km^{2}), or 0.17%, are water. The center of the CDP, along US 12, is in the valley of Tenmile Creek, which rises at the Continental Divide and flows northeast into the Helena Valley and the Missouri River.

=== Climate ===
Austin 1 W is a nearby weather station located in the Helena neighbourhood of Austin.

Climate data for Austin, Montana, 1991–2020 normals, extremes 1950–2018
Month	Jan	Feb	Mar	Apr	May	Jun	Jul	Aug	Sep	Oct	Nov	Dec	Year
Record high °F (°C)	63 (17)	62 (17)	70 (21)	80 (27)	86 (30)	99 (37)	97 (36)	100 (38)	92 (33)	81 (27)	68 (20)	59 (15)	100 (38)
Mean maximum °F (°C)	48.5 (9.2)	50.6 (10.3)	59.1 (15.1)	70.8 (21.6)	79.0 (26.1)	84.5 (29.2)	90.8 (32.7)	89.4 (31.9)	83.3 (28.5)	72.0 (22.2)	56.7 (13.7)	46.4 (8.0)	92.5 (33.6)
Mean daily maximum °F (°C)	29.6 (−1.3)	32.3 (0.2)	41.5 (5.3)	49.8 (9.9)	60.1 (15.6)	67.9 (19.9)	78.4 (25.8)	78.3 (25.7)	67.2 (19.6)	51.1 (10.6)	36.8 (2.7)	29.4 (−1.4)	51.9 (11.0)
Daily mean °F (°C)	21.0 (−6.1)	22.5 (−5.3)	30.4 (−0.9)	38.0 (3.3)	47.7 (8.7)	55.0 (12.8)	63.6 (17.6)	62.8 (17.1)	53.1 (11.7)	40.4 (4.7)	28.1 (−2.2)	21.0 (−6.1)	40.3 (4.6)
Mean daily minimum °F (°C)	12.5 (−10.8)	12.6 (−10.8)	19.3 (−7.1)	26.3 (−3.2)	35.4 (1.9)	42.1 (5.6)	48.7 (9.3)	47.3 (8.5)	39.1 (3.9)	29.8 (−1.2)	19.5 (−6.9)	12.7 (−10.7)	28.8 (−1.8)
Mean minimum °F (°C)	−10.2 (−23.4)	−11.1 (−23.9)	0.7 (−17.4)	14.5 (−9.7)	24.3 (−4.3)	31.8 (−0.1)	38.0 (3.3)	36.8 (2.7)	25.5 (−3.6)	11.5 (−11.4)	−1.9 (−18.8)	−11.8 (−24.3)	−23.4 (−30.8)
Record low °F (°C)	−33 (−36)	−38 (−39)	−26 (−32)	−9 (−23)	10 (−12)	23 (−5)	31 (−1)	26 (−3)	12 (−11)	−9 (−23)	−28 (−33)	−41 (−41)	−41 (−41)
Average precipitation inches (mm)	0.84 (21)	0.99 (25)	0.84 (21)	1.66 (42)	2.34 (59)	2.74 (70)	1.22 (31)	1.09 (28)	1.28 (33)	1.25 (32)	1.27 (32)	0.93 (24)	16.45 (418)
Average precipitation days (≥ 0.01 in)	6.2	5.4	6.0	8.0	9.0	9.1	6.0	5.6	5.5	6.5	5.5	5.5	78.3
Source 1: NOAA (mean maxima/minima 1981–2010)
Source 2: XMACIS2

== Demographics ==
Historical population
Census	Pop.	Note	%±
2020	1,331		—
U.S. Decennial Census

As of the census of 2000, there were 1,711 people, 725 households, and 480 families residing in the CDP. The population density was 116.1 inhabitants per square mile (44.8/km^{2}). There were 768 housing units at an average density of 52.1 per square mile (20.1/km^{2}). The racial makeup of the CDP was 95.03% White, 0.12% African American, 1.58% Native American, 0.35% Asian, 0.47% from other races, and 2.45% from two or more races. Hispanic or Latino of any race were 1.46% of the population.

There were 725 households, out of which 30.5% had children under the age of 18 living with them, 52.1% were married couples living together, 9.1% had a female householder with no husband present, and 33.7% were non-families. 28.7% of all households were made up of individuals, and 9.2% had someone living alone who was 65 years of age or older. The average household size was 2.35 and the average family size was 2.87.

In the CDP, the population was spread out, with 25.0% under the age of 18, 6.5% from 18 to 24, 27.9% from 25 to 44, 27.1% from 45 to 64, and 13.5% who were 65 years of age or older. The median age was 39 years. For every 100 females, there were 102.0 males. For every 100 females age 18 and over, there were 102.5 males.

The median income for a household in the CDP was $35,655, and the median income for a family was $44,554. Males had a median income of $30,724 versus $26,827 for females. The per capita income for the CDP was $18,299. About 7.1% of families and 10.0% of the population were below the poverty line, including 10.7% of those under age 18 and 7.1% of those age 65 or over.

== Population Change ==
Population in 2010: 1,637. Population change since 2000: -4.3%. Males 870 (53.2%) and Females 767 (46.8%).

Zip codes: 59636.

== Education ==
For almost all of the CDP, Helena Elementary School District is the elementary school district, while Trinity Elementary School District covers a small part of the CDP. Helena High School District covers the entire CDP.
