= Helena High School =

Coordinates: 46°35′43″N 112°01′08″W

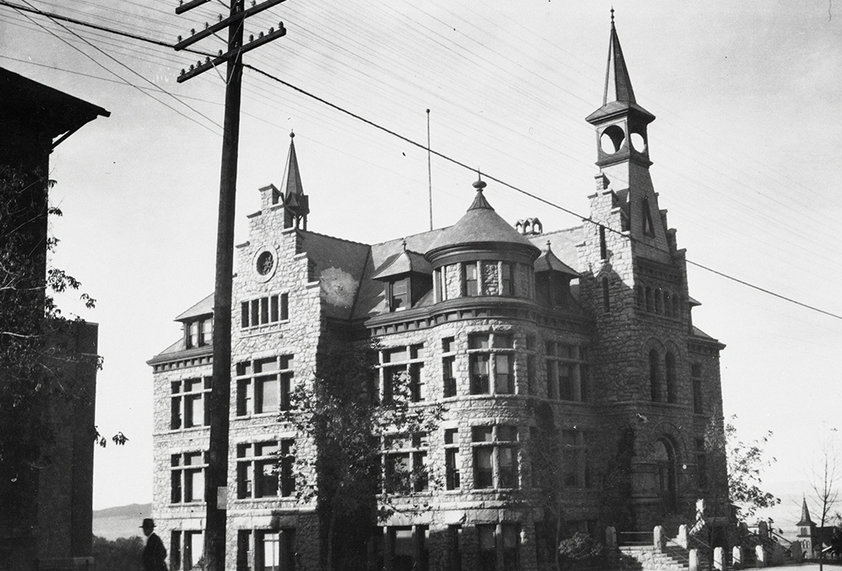
- The original building, 1905

Location
- 1300 Billings Avenue; Helena, Montana; United States

Information
- Type: Public high school
- Established: 1876
- School district: Helena Public School District
- Principal: Brian Kessler
- Teaching staff: 74.30 (FTE)
- Grades: 9 through 12
- Enrollment: 1,087 (2023–2024)
- Student to teacher ratio: 14.63
- Colors: Cardinal red and white
- Athletics: AA (largest class in Montana)
- Mascot: Bengals
- Nickname: HHS
- Rival: Helena Capital High School
- Accreditation: Montana Office of Public Instruction
- Newspaper: The Nugget
- Website: Helena High website

Helena High School is a public high school for grades 9 through 12 located in Helena, Montana, United States. It is part of the Helena Public School District. Founded in September 1876, it is the second oldest high school in Montana. The First being Loyola Sacred Heart High School in Missoula, founded in 1873. A new building was completed in August 1935 and it was almost destroyed a few months later in the 1935 Helena earthquake. In 1955, the building became Helena Junior High School (now Helena Middle School) and Helena High School moved into its present location at 1300 Billings Avenue, just off Montana Avenue.

== Curriculum ==
Four foreign languages are taught at Helena High: French, German, Latin, and Spanish. The English Department, with 22 faculty, offers instruction in English literature and composition, as well as elective studies. Students are encouraged to take honors and Advanced Placement (AP) in English, math, science, and history. There are also many elective options.

== Extracurricular activities ==
There are many extra-curricular clubs and activities for students to get involved at Helena High School. School teams and clubs include:

- Basketball – Boys and Girls
- Cross Country – Boys and Girls
- Fast Pitch Softball
- Football
- Soccer – Boys and Girls
- Swimming
- Tennis – Boys and Girls
- Track and Field – Boys and Girls
- Volleyball
- Wrestling
- Speech and Debate
- Mock Trial
- Dance/Cheer Teams
- Flag Football

== Notable alumni ==
- Max Baucus, former United States Senator and United States Ambassador to China (graduated in 1959)
- Steve Bullock, former governor of Montana
- Dan Carpenter, NFL placekicker for the Buffalo Bills
- Gary Cooper, Academy Award winning actor (dropped out in his sophomore year)
- Chuck Darling, member of 1956 Summer Olympics basketball gold medalists, First team All-American at University of Iowa
- Pat Donovan, NFL tackle for the Dallas Cowboys
- David Fuller, politician. Montana state senator
- Susie Hedalen, 18 Montana superintendent of public instruction
- L. Ron Hubbard, author and the founder of Scientology; enrolled at Helena High during his junior year
- Keyshawn James-Newby, NFL linebacker for the Philadelphia Eagles
- Carol Judge (1958), First Lady of Montana (1973–1980); healthcare activist and registered nurse
- Ian MacDonald (born Ulva Pippy), actor on film and television
- Colin Meloy, lead singer and songwriter for the Portland, Oregon, folk-rock band The Decemberists
- Maile Meloy, author
- Luke Muszkiewicz, state legislator
- Jacob Hahn, Cybersecurity expert and speaker
- Kimberly Reed, director and producer of Prodigal Sons
- William Roth, former member of the United States Senate from Delaware
- Danny Sprinkle, head coach of the University of Washington men's basketball team
- A. L. Strand, president of Montana State College (1937–1942) and Oregon State University (1942–1961)
- Joseph P. Mazurek, former Montana Attorney General and member of the Montana Senate

== Notable faculty ==
- Mary S. Cummins (1854-1904), teacher and principal of Helena High School

== Bibliography ==
- Superintendent of Public Instruction. Biennial Report of the Superintendent of Public Instruction. Vol. II. Montana Department of Public Instruction. Helena, Mont.: Independent Publishing Co., 1903.
