= Anne Appleby =

American painter

- Born: 1954 (age 71–72); Harrisburg, Pennsylvania
- Education: University of Montana (BFA 1977); San Francisco Art Institute (MFA 1989)
- Known for: Color field/landscape reductive paintings
- Awards: SFMoMA SECA Art Award in 1996; Biennial Award from the Louis Comfort Tiffany Foundation in New York in 1999
- Website: www.applebystudios.com

Anne Appleby (born 1954) is an American color field and landscape reductive painter, who lives and works in Jefferson City, Montana.

== Education and background ==
Anne Appleby was born in 1954 in Harrisburg, Pennsylvania. She received her Bachelor of Fine Arts in 1977 from the University of Montana and her Master of Fine Arts in 1989 from the San Francisco Art Institute. Before attending the Art Institute, Appleby spent a fifteen-year apprenticeship with an Ojibwe Indian elder in Montana. From him, she learned her patient observation of nature.

Appleby lives in Jefferson City, Montana.

== Career ==
Appleby's works were described by the ArtZone 461 Gallery as "simple arrangements of colored canvas panels", with titles that take inspiration from "the natural world". Although panels may initially appear monochromatic, they are actually "deep and luminous gradations of hue." Appleby's work is often shown with that of "reductive" painters, but it does not exactly fit into the "pure" painting philosophy held by many of them. In 2004, Kenneth Baker wrote that "using no forms except monochrome panels, Appleby must struggle often with the potential problem of repetition. But [she] achieves a freshness and distinctness that persuade a viewer that she means each one. It is as if she has learned to translate the energy of intent directly into radiance of color."

=== Exhibitions and awards ===
She has participated in group exhibitions in institutions such as the Tacoma Art Museum in Washington, the American Academy in Rome, and the San Francisco Museum of Modern Art, where in 1996 she was awarded the SFMoMA SECA Art Award. She was also the 1999 recipient of the Biennial Award from the Louis Comfort Tiffany Foundation in New York. Appleby shows her paintings at San Francisco's Anglim Gilbert Gallery, Franklin Parrasch Gallery in New York and Parrach Hiejenen in LA.

==== Solo exhibitions ====
Anne Appleby has had various solo exhibitions.

- Diego Rivera Gallery, San Francisco Art Institute (1989)
- M.F.A. Exhibition, Fort Mason Center (1989)
- The Dancing Ground, installation, Mincher/Wilcox Gallery, San Francisco, California (1990)
- The Blue List, installation, Point Reyes Station, California (1990)
- Gallery Paule Anglim, San Francisco, California (1993)
- Littlejohn Contemporary, New York, New York (1996)
- Greg Kucera Gallery, Seattle, Washington (1998)
- Holter Museum of Art, Helena, Montana (1998)
- Yellowstone Art Museum, Billings, Montana (1999)
- Anne Appleby and Wes Mills, Richard Levy Gallery, Albuquerque, New Mexico (2000)
- Nora Eccles Harrison Museum of Art, Utah State University, Logan, UT (2000)
- Verona Suite, Crown Point Press, San Francisco (2000)
- Boise Art Museum, Idaho (2000)
- Anne Appleby and Wes Mills, Missoula Art Museum, Montana (2000)
- Sassuolo Ducal Palace, Camera di Fetonte, Sassulo, Italy (2001)
- University of Washington, Seattle (2002)
- Galerie Susanne Albrecht, Munich, Germany (2006)
- Villa e Collezione Panza, Varese, Italy (2007)
- Galerie Albrecht, Berlin, Germany (2008)
- Schmidt Contemporary, St. Louis, Missouri (2009)
- Museum Ritter, Waldenbuch, Germany (2010)
- The Mayor Gallery, London, England (2010)
- Ulrich Museum of Contemporary Art, Wichita, Kansas (2011)
- Danese, New York, New York (2012)
- Portland Art Museum Contemporary Northwest Artists Awards, Portland, Oregon (2013)
- Glaisteo River Basin Paintings, Charlotte Jackson Fine Art, Santa Fe, NM (2015)
- Montana Spring, Borzo Gallery, Amsterdam, Netherlands (2016)
- Nascent, Anglim Gilbert Gallery, San Francisco, CA (2016)
- But That Was Then, PDX Contemporary Art, Portland, OR (2016)
- We Sit Together the Mountain and Me, Tacoma Art Museum, WA (2018)
- Anglim Gilbert Gallery (2018)
- Here We Are, Helen E. Copeland Gallery, Montana State University, Bozeman, MT (2019)
- Anne Appleby: Hymn: First Light, Franklin Parrasch Gallery (2019)

=== Selected collections ===
Appleby's works are held in various museum collections.

- The National Gallery of Art
- Art Institute of Chicago
- Portland Art Museum
- Crocker Art Museum
- Denver Art Museum
- Berkeley Art Museum
- Missoula Art Museum
- Henry Art Gallery, University of Washington
- Seattle Art Museum
- San Francisco Museum of Modern Art
- San Jose Museum of Art
- Tacoma Art Museum
- Yellowstone Art Museum
- Boise Art Museum
- Albright-Knox Museum
- The Panza Collection, Lugano, Switzerland
- Museum of Modern and Contemporary Art of Trento and Rovereto
- Daimler Art Collection, Stuttgart/Berlin, Germany
- Ulrich Museum, Wichita State University
