= Alhambra, Montana =

- Populated Place
- Location within Montana Location within the United States
- Coordinates: 46°27′04″N 111°59′16″W
- Country: United States
- State: Montana
- County: Jefferson
- Elevation: 4,287 ft (1,307 m)

Population
  - Total: N/A
- Time zone: UTC-7 (Mountain (MST))
  - Summer (DST): UTC-6 (MDT)
- Postal code: 59634
- Area code: 406
- GNIS feature ID: 770091

Alhambra is a populated place in Jefferson County, Montana, United States. It is a subdivision approximately one mile south of Clancy. Its postal code is 59634. Alhambra is part of the Helena Micropolitan Area, and its population is counted within the Clancy census-designated place.

== History ==
Alhambra was a resort town situated south of Helena and relied on the heavy traffic when mining was important in the area. Alhambra and Sunnyside Hot Springs were the two hotels in the town, together composing a medical and recreational resort that flourished the 1860s until the 1950s. The hot water is now used to heat a retirement home on the site of one of the hotels. Alhambra Hot Springs consists of four main springs and a number of hot water seeps located along Warm Springs Creek. The water temperature averages 138 degrees F. The slightly radioactive hot water flows 0.25 mile downhill to the rehabilitation center, where the water is piped through the concrete floor for heating.

In 1959, disaster struck when a fire destroyed the Sunnyside Hotel, which was never rebuilt. Although the water in the area was bottled and sold commercially and considered therapeutic in earlier years it was eventually found to be naturally radioactive and unfit for use. The days of Alhambra as a resort came to an end, though the area had already been in decline as mining production decreased.

A post office operated at Alhambra from 1885 to 1947.
