= Helena Valley West Central, Montana =

- Census-designated place
- Location of Helena Valley West Central, Montana
- Coordinates: 46°37′43″N 112°03′40″W
- Country: United States
- State: Montana
- County: Lewis and Clark

Area
  - Total: 26.42 sq mi (68.44 km^{2})
  - Land: 26.39 sq mi (68.36 km^{2})
  - Water: 0.031 sq mi (0.08 km^{2})
- Elevation: 4,177 ft (1,273 m)

Population (2020)
  - Total: 8,670
  - Density: 328.5/sq mi (126.82/km^{2})
- Time zone: UTC-7 (Mountain (MST))
  - Summer (DST): UTC-6 (MDT)
- Area code: 406
- FIPS code: 30-35637
- GNIS feature ID: 2408374

Helena Valley West Central is a census-designated place (CDP) in Lewis and Clark County, Montana, United States. As of the 2020 census, Helena Valley West Central had a population of 8,670. It is part of the Helena Micropolitan Statistical Area.

== Geography ==
Helena Valley West Central is located in southern Lewis and Clark County. It is bordered to the south by the city of Helena, the state capital. It is bordered to the southwest by the Helena West Side CDP, to the east by the Helena Valley Northeast CDP, and to the north by the Helena Valley Northwest CDP, all unincorporated areas. Interstate 15 forms the eastern border of the Helena Valley West Central CDP, with access from Exit 200 (East Lincoln Road). The center of the CDP is 5 miles (8 km) north of downtown Helena.

According to the United States Census Bureau, the CDP has a total area of 26.4 square miles (68.4 km^{2}), of which 0.03 square miles (0.08 km^{2}), or 0.11%, are water. The Scratchgravel Hills, with a summit elevation of 5,252 feet (1,601 m), are in the western part of the CDP.

== Demographics ==
Historical population
Census	Pop.	Note	%±
2020	8,670		—
U.S. Decennial Census

=== 2020 census ===
As of the 2020 census, Helena Valley West Central had a population of 8,670. The median age was 42.2 years. 24.1% of residents were under the age of 18 and 18.0% of residents were 65 years of age or older. For every 100 females there were 99.8 males, and for every 100 females age 18 and over there were 99.2 males age 18 and over.

77.9% of residents lived in urban areas, while 22.1% lived in rural areas.

There were 3,378 households in Helena Valley West Central, of which 30.5% had children under the age of 18 living in them. Of all households, 57.8% were married-couple households, 17.0% were households with a male householder and no spouse or partner present, and 19.3% were households with a female householder and no spouse or partner present. About 21.9% of all households were made up of individuals and 10.4% had someone living alone who was 65 years of age or older.

There were 3,483 housing units, of which 3.0% were vacant. The homeowner vacancy rate was 0.9% and the rental vacancy rate was 1.2%.

Racial composition as of the 2020 census
Race	Number	Percent
White	7,888	91.0%
Black or African American	24	0.3%
American Indian and Alaska Native	109	1.3%
Asian	26	0.3%
Native Hawaiian and Other Pacific Islander	2	0.0%
Some other race	68	0.8%
Two or more races	553	6.4%
Hispanic or Latino (of any race)	288	3.3%

=== 2000 census ===
As of the 2000 census, there were 6,983 people, 2,555 households, and 1,992 families residing in the CDP. The population density was 262.1 inhabitants per square mile (101.2/km^{2}). There were 2,667 housing units at an average density of 100.1 per square mile (38.6/km^{2}). The racial makeup of the CDP was 96.79% White, 0.16% African American, 1.42% Native American, 0.24% Asian, 0.06% Pacific Islander, 0.36% from other races, and 0.97% from two or more races. Hispanic or Latino of any race were 0.97% of the population.

There were 2,555 households, out of which 40.1% had children under the age of 18 living with them, 66.1% were married couples living together, 7.5% had a female householder with no husband present, and 22.0% were non-families. 18.2% of all households were made up of individuals, and 5.2% had someone living alone who was 65 years of age or older. The average household size was 2.73 and the average family size was 3.09.

In the CDP, the population was spread out, with 29.1% under the age of 18, 6.2% from 18 to 24, 28.2% from 25 to 44, 27.3% from 45 to 64, and 9.3% who were 65 years of age or older. The median age was 38 years. For every 100 females, there were 99.7 males. For every 100 females age 18 and over, there were 98.5 males.

The median income for a household in the CDP was $43,881, and the median income for a family was $51,024. Males had a median income of $37,780 versus $23,703 for females. The per capita income for the CDP was $18,920. About 4.5% of families and 6.4% of the population were below the poverty line, including 8.3% of those under age 18 and 3.1% of those age 65 or over.

== Education ==
For almost all of the CDP, Helena Elementary School District is the elementary school district, while Trinity Elementary School District covers a small part of the CDP. Helena High School District covers the entire CDP.
