= Helena metropolitan area, Montana =

Location in the USA

Helena Metropolitan Area
- Metropolitan Statistical Area
- Helena , MT Metropolitan Statistical Area
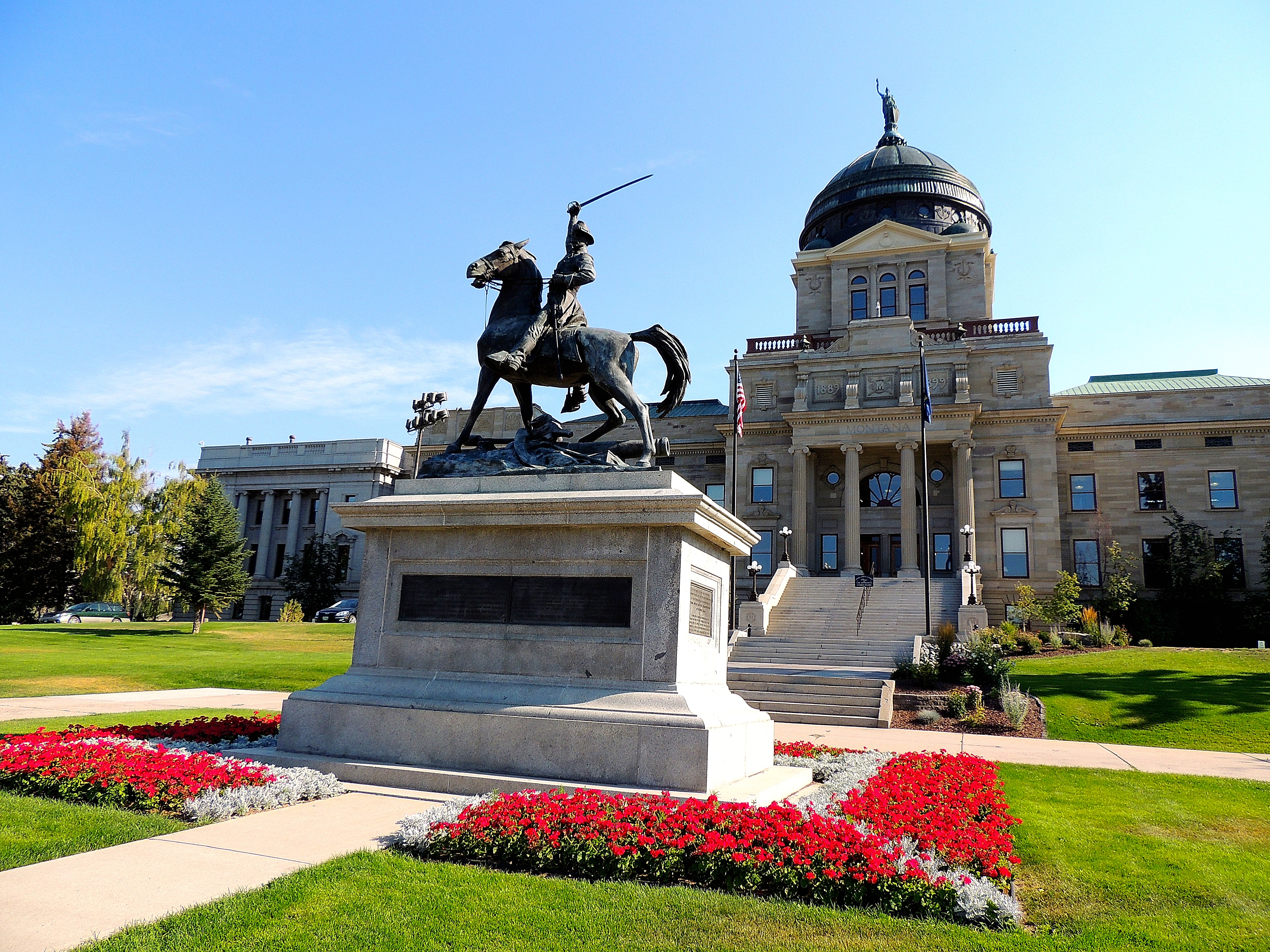
- Montana State Capitol
Interactive Map of Helena, MT MSA
City of Helena
Helena, MT MSA
- Country: United States
- State: Montana
- Principal City: Helena
- Time zone: UTC-7 (MST)
  - Summer (DST): UTC-6 (MDT)

The Helena Metropolitan Statistical Area, as defined by the United States Census Bureau, is an area consisting of two counties in western Montana, anchored by the city of Helena.

As of the 2014 census estimate, the MSA had a population of 77,414, a 16% increase over the 2000 census.

== Counties ==
- Broadwater
- Jefferson
- Lewis and Clark

== Communities ==
=== Places with more than 25,000 inhabitants ===
- Helena (Principal city)

=== Places with 5,000 to 10,000 inhabitants ===
- Helena Valley Southeast CDP
- Helena Valley West Central CDP

=== Places with 1,000 to 5,000 inhabitants ===
- Boulder
- Clancy CDP
- East Helena
- Helena Valley Northeast CDP
- Helena Valley Northwest CDP
- Helena West Side CDP
- Lincoln CDP
- Montana City CDP
- Whitehall

=== Places with less than 1,000 inhabitants ===
- Augusta CDP
- Basin CDP
- Cardwell CDP
- Jefferson City CDP

== Demographics ==
The 2012 U.S. Census estimate of the Helena area is 76,277. As of the census of 2000, there were 65,765 people, 26,597 households, and 17,813 families residing within the MSA. The racial makeup of the MSA was 95.34% White, 0.19% African American, 1.92% Native American, 0.50% Asian, 0.05% Pacific Islander, 0.38% from other races, and 1.62% from two or more races. Hispanic or Latino of any race were 1.51% of the population.

The median income for a household in the MSA was $39,433, and the median income for a family was $47,839. Males had a median income of $34,134 versus $24,486 for females. The per capita income for the MSA was $18,507.

== See also ==
- Montana census statistical areas
