= Jefferson County, Montana =

County in Montana, United States

- County
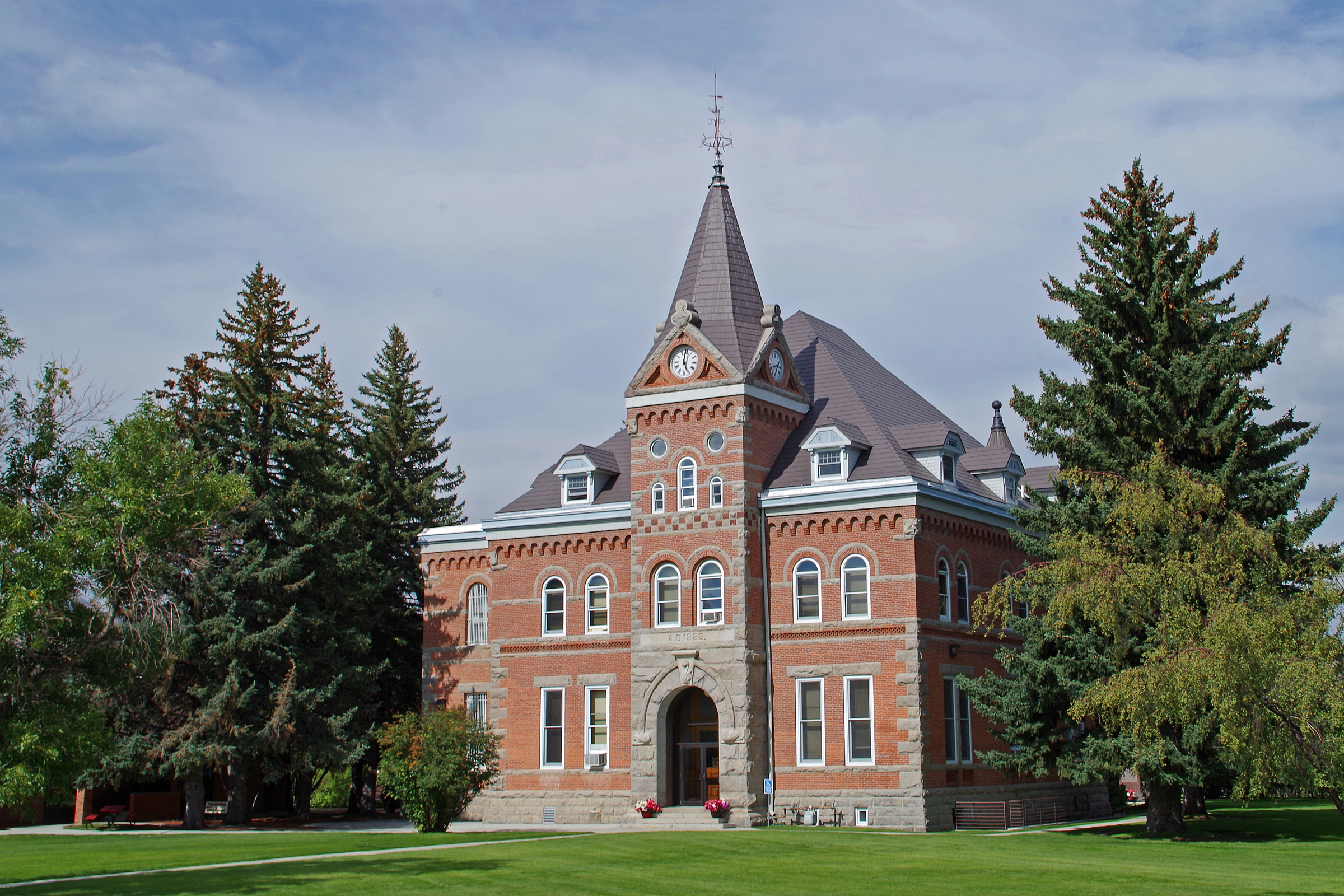
- Jefferson County Courthouse in Boulder

- Location within the U.S. state of Montana
- Coordinates: 46.18°N 112.11°W
- Country: United States
- State: Montana
- Founded: February 2, 1865
- Named for: Thomas Jefferson
- Seat: Boulder
- Largest town: Clancy

Area
  - Total: 1,659 sq mi (4,300 km^{2})
  - Land: 1,656 sq mi (4,290 km^{2})
  - Water: 2.6 sq mi (6.7 km^{2}) 0.2%

Population (2020)
  - Total: 12,085
  - Estimate (2025): 13,329 ▲
  - Density: 7/sq mi (2.7/km^{2})
- Time zone: UTC−7 (Mountain)
  - Summer (DST): UTC−6 (MDT)
- Congressional district: 2nd
- Website: www.jeffersoncounty-mt.gov
- Montana county number 51

Jefferson County is a county in Montana, United States. As of the 2020 census, the population was 12,085. Its county seat is Boulder. The county was created in 1865 and named for President Thomas Jefferson.

Jefferson County is part of the Helena, MT Micropolitan Statistical Area.

== Geography ==
According to the United States Census Bureau, the county has a total area of 1,659 square miles (4,300 km^{2}), of which 1,656 square miles (4,290 km^{2}) is land and 2.6 square miles (6.7 km^{2}) (0.2%) is water.

=== Major highways ===
- Interstate 15
- Interstate 90
- U.S. Highway 12
- U.S. Highway 287
- Montana Highway 2
- Montana Highway 41
- Montana Highway 55
- Montana Highway 69

=== Adjacent counties ===
- Lewis and Clark County - north
- Broadwater County - east
- Gallatin County - southeast
- Madison County - south
- Silver Bow County - west
- Deer Lodge County - west
- Powell County - northwest

=== National protected areas ===
- Deerlodge National Forest (part)
- Helena National Forest (part)

== Politics ==
United States presidential election results for Jefferson County, Montana
Year	Republican		Democratic		Third party(ies)	
Year	No.	%	No.	%	No.	%
1904	663	45.54%	580	39.84%	213	14.63%
1908	546	39.22%	714	51.29%	132	9.48%
1912	239	20.03%	479	40.15%	475	39.82%
1916	712	36.63%	1,124	57.82%	108	5.56%
1920	969	54.47%	688	38.67%	122	6.86%
1924	648	36.49%	434	24.44%	694	39.08%
1928	1,013	56.97%	751	42.24%	14	0.79%
1932	784	37.09%	1,246	58.94%	84	3.97%
1936	573	27.78%	1,409	68.30%	81	3.93%
1940	830	39.58%	1,259	60.04%	8	0.38%
1944	797	49.72%	803	50.09%	3	0.19%
1948	750	45.62%	836	50.85%	58	3.53%
1952	1,084	60.76%	687	38.51%	13	0.73%
1956	1,049	61.38%	660	38.62%	0	0.00%
1960	817	51.38%	769	48.36%	4	0.25%
1964	662	40.59%	967	59.29%	2	0.12%
1968	798	45.06%	820	46.30%	153	8.64%
1972	1,281	56.06%	904	39.56%	100	4.38%
1976	1,387	52.26%	1,210	45.59%	57	2.15%
1980	1,841	57.12%	1,055	32.73%	327	10.15%
1984	2,226	61.53%	1,324	36.59%	68	1.88%
1988	2,007	52.31%	1,746	45.50%	84	2.19%
1992	1,541	36.47%	1,415	33.49%	1,269	30.04%
1996	2,248	46.82%	1,775	36.97%	778	16.20%
2000	3,308	64.07%	1,513	29.30%	342	6.62%
2004	3,844	65.51%	1,881	32.06%	143	2.44%
2008	3,538	55.80%	2,582	40.72%	221	3.49%
2012	4,055	62.18%	2,272	34.84%	194	2.98%
2016	4,177	62.21%	1,998	29.76%	539	8.03%
2020	5,345	65.57%	2,625	32.20%	181	2.22%
2024	5,544	66.85%	2,516	30.34%	233	2.81%

== Demographics ==
Historical population
Census	Pop.	Note	%±
1870	1,531		—
1880	2,464		60.9%
1890	6,026		144.6%
1900	5,330		−11.5%
1910	5,601		5.1%
1920	5,203		−7.1%
1930	4,133		−20.6%
1940	4,664		12.8%
1950	4,014		−13.9%
1960	4,297		7.1%
1970	5,238		21.9%
1980	7,029		34.2%
1990	7,939		12.9%
2000	10,049		26.6%
2010	11,406		13.5%
2020	12,085		6.0%
2025 (est.)	13,329	▲	10.3%
U.S. Decennial Census; 1790–1960, 1900–1990, 1990–2000, 2010–2020

=== 2020 census ===
As of the 2020 census, there were 12,085 people living in the county. Of the residents, 20.8% were under the age of 18 and 24.0% were 65 years of age or older; the median age was 49.2 years. For every 100 females there were 103.1 males, and for every 100 females age 18 and over there were 101.8 males. 0.0% of residents lived in urban areas and 100.0% lived in rural areas. The racial makeup of the county was 91.2% White, 0.1% Black or African American, 1.3% American Indian and Alaska Native, 0.4% Asian, 0.8% from some other race, and 6.2% from two or more races. Hispanic or Latino residents of any race comprised 2.4% of the population. There were 4,894 households in the county, of which 26.5% had children under the age of 18 living with them and 16.3% had a female householder with no spouse or partner present. About 23.8% of all households were made up of individuals and 12.1% had someone living alone who was 65 years of age or older. There were 5,375 housing units, of which 8.9% were vacant. Among occupied housing units, 85.2% were owner-occupied and 14.8% were renter-occupied. The homeowner vacancy rate was 0.9% and the rental vacancy rate was 6.6%.

=== 2010 census ===
As of the 2010 census, there were 11,406 people, 4,512 households, and 3,301 families residing in the county. The population density was 6.9 inhabitants per square mile (2.7/km^{2}). There were 5,055 housing units at an average density of 3.1 per square mile (1.2/km^{2}). The racial makeup of the county was 95.5% white, 1.4% American Indian, 0.4% Asian, 0.1% black or African American, 0.4% from other races, and 2.2% from two or more races. Those of Hispanic or Latino origin made up 2.0% of the population. In terms of ancestry, 31.3% were German, 19.1% were Irish, 17.2% were English, 10.8% were Norwegian, and 4.2% were American.

Of the 4,512 households, 28.8% had children under the age of 18 living with them, 63.7% were married couples living together, 5.4% had a female householder with no husband present, 26.8% were non-families, and 22.6% of all households were made up of individuals. The average household size was 2.48 and the average family size was 2.90. The median age was 46.2 years.

The median income for a household in the county was $56,695 and the median income for a family was $67,195. Males had a median income of $50,978 versus $34,148 for females. The per capita income for the county was $26,437. About 2.7% of families and 12.8% of the population were below the poverty line, including 5.1% of those under age 18 and 8.6% of those age 65 or over.

== Communities ==
=== Towns ===
- Boulder (county seat)
- Whitehall

=== Census-designated places ===
- Basin
- Cardwell
- Clancy (includes Alhambra)
- Elkhorn
- Jefferson City
- Montana City
- Rader Creek
- South Hills

=== Unincorporated communities ===
- Amazon
- Bernice
- Corbin
- Elk Park
- Homestake
- Leadville
- La Hood Park
- Louisville
- Pappas Place
- Paul Place
- Piedmont
- Pipestone
- Renova

=== Former communities ===
- Comet
- Wickes

== Education ==
Whitehall Public Schools has two components: Whitehall Elementary School District and Whitehall High School District.

High school districts include Jefferson High School District and Whitehall High School District.

Elementary school districts include:

- Basin Elementary School District
- Boulder Elementary School District
- Cardwell Elementary School District
- Clancy Elementary School District
- Montana City Elementary School District
- Three Forks Elementary School District
- Whitehall Elementary School District
- Willow Creek Elementary School District

== See also ==
- List of counties in Montana
- List of lakes in Jefferson County, Montana
- List of mountains in Jefferson County, Montana
- National Register of Historic Places listings in Jefferson County, Montana
