= Capital High School (Helena, Montana) =

Coordinates: 46.614°N 112.048°W

Helena Capital High School

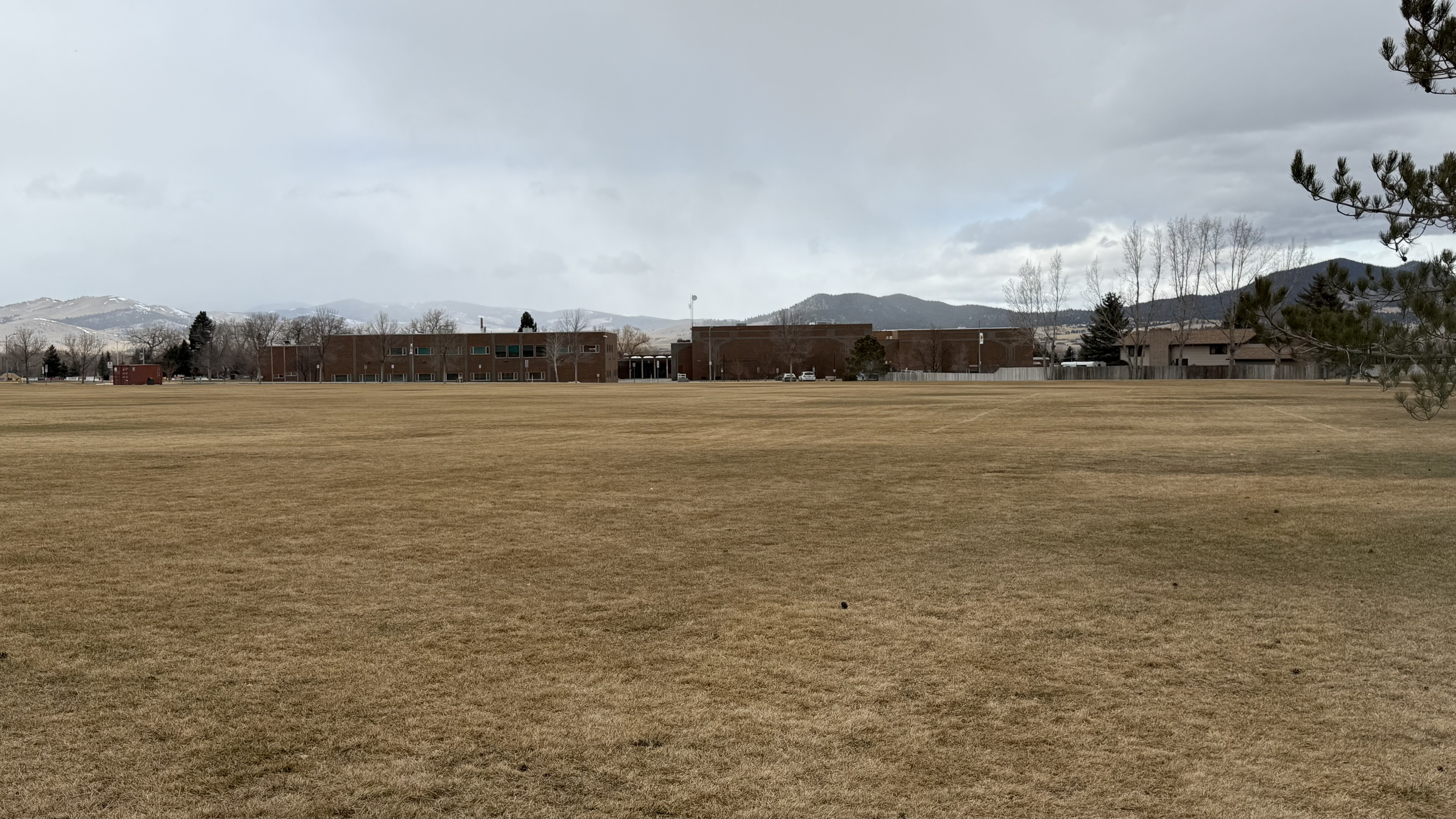

Location
- 100 Valley Drive; Helena, Montana; United States

Information
- Type: Public high school
- Established: 1973, 53 years ago
- School district: Helena P.S.D.
- Principal: Cal Boyle
- Teaching staff: 85.10 (FTE)
- Grades: 9–12
- Enrollment: 1,367 (2023–2024)
- Student to teacher ratio: 16.06
- Colors: Brown & Gold
- Athletics: MHSA AA Basketball (boys & girls); Football (boys); Golf (boys & girls); Softball (girls); Soccer (boys & girls); Speech & Debate; Swimming (boys & girls); Tennis (boys & girls); Track & field (boys & girls); Volleyball (girls); Flag Football (girls) Wrestling (boys & girls)
- Mascot: Bruin
- Nickname: CHS
- Rival: Helena Bengals
- Accreditation: Montana Office of Public Instruction
- Yearbook: The Capital Dome
- Elevation: 3,880 ft (1,185 m) AMSL
- Website: chs.helenaschools.org

Capital High School is a four-year public high school in the western United States, located in Helena, Montana. The building was originally built in the 1960s as a Catholic high school, but closed following the graduation of the class of 1969. The property was purchased by the Helena Public School District and it became its second high school 53 years ago in 1973.

== Notable alumni ==
- Stuart Long (1963–2014), Class of 1981, boxer-turned-Catholic priest; inspiration for the 2022 film Father Stu
- Dava Newman (born 1964), Class of 1982, engineer and NASA administrator
- Bobby Petrino (born 1961), Class of 1979, college football head coach
- Paul Petrino (born 1967), Class of 1985, college football head coach
- Sean O'Malley (fighter) (born 1994), Did not graduate, Professional UFC fighter and former UFC Bantamweight Champion
