= York, Montana =

- Census-designated place
- Location within Montana Location within the United States
- Coordinates: 46°43′09″N 111°44′58″W
- Country: United States
- State: Montana
- County: Lewis and Clark

Area
  - Total: 0.33 sq mi (0.85 km^{2})
  - Land: 0.33 sq mi (0.85 km^{2})
  - Water: 0 sq mi (0.00 km^{2})
- Elevation: 4,049 ft (1,234 m)

Population (2020)
  - Total: 94
  - Density: 286.8/sq mi (110.75/km^{2})
- Time zone: UTC-7 (Mountain (MST))
  - Summer (DST): UTC-6 (MDT)
- ZIP Code: 59602 (Helena)
- Area code: 406
- FIPS code: 30-82525
- GNIS feature ID: 2804306

York is an unincorporated community and census-designated place (CDP) in Lewis and Clark County, Montana, United States. It is in the southeastern part of the county, 20 miles (32 km) northeast of Helena, the state capital. It sits at the southwestern base of the Big Belt Mountains, in the valley of Trout Creek, which flows southwest to the Missouri River in Hauser Lake.

York was first listed as a CDP prior to the 2020 census. As of the 2020 census, York had a population of 94.

== Demographics ==
Historical population
Census	Pop.	Note	%±
2020	94		—
U.S. Decennial Census

== Education ==
The CDP is covered by a unified K-12 school district, East Helena K-12.
