= Helena Valley Northeast, Montana =

- Census-designated place
- Location of Helena Valley Northeast, Montana
- Coordinates: 46°42′18″N 111°58′20″W
- Country: United States
- State: Montana
- County: Lewis and Clark

Area
  - Total: 57.88 sq mi (149.91 km^{2})
  - Land: 53.24 sq mi (137.90 km^{2})
  - Water: 4.64 sq mi (12.01 km^{2})
- Elevation: 3,652 ft (1,113 m)

Population (2020)
  - Total: 3,813
  - Density: 71.6/sq mi (27.65/km^{2})
- Time zone: UTC-7 (Mountain (MST))
  - Summer (DST): UTC-6 (MDT)
- Area code: 406
- FIPS code: 30-35628
- GNIS feature ID: 2408371

Helena Valley Northeast is a census-designated place (CDP) in Lewis and Clark County, Montana, United States. As of the 2020 census, Helena Valley Northeast had a population of 3,813. It is part of the Helena Micropolitan Statistical Area.

== Geography ==
Helena Valley Northeast is located in southern Lewis and Clark County and is bordered to the southwest by the city of Helena, the state capital. It is bordered to the south by the Helena Valley Southeast CDP, to the west by the Helena Valley West Central CDP, and to the northwest by the Helena Valley Northwest CDP, all unincorporated. Interstate 15 forms the western edge of the Helena Valley Northeast CDP, with access from Exit 200 (East Lincoln Road), which is approximately 10 miles (16 km) north of downtown Helena.

According to the United States Census Bureau, the CDP has a total area of 51.1 square miles (132.4 km^{2}), of which 46.5 square miles (120.4 km^{2}) are land and 4.6 square miles (12.0 km^{2}), or 9.06%, are water. Lake Helena, an arm of Hauser Lake, is in the center of the CDP. Hauser Lake is an impoundment on the Missouri River, and Lake Helena connects to it via Prickly Pear Creek, all at the same elevation as Hauser Lake.

== Demographics ==
Historical population
Census	Pop.	Note	%±
2020	3,813		—
U.S. Decennial Census

=== 2020 census ===
As of the 2020 census, Helena Valley Northeast had a population of 3,813. The median age was 46.5 years. 22.3% of residents were under the age of 18 and 21.1% of residents were 65 years of age or older. For every 100 females there were 102.8 males, and for every 100 females age 18 and over there were 100.2 males age 18 and over.

16.6% of residents lived in urban areas, while 83.4% lived in rural areas.

There were 1,452 households in Helena Valley Northeast, of which 30.0% had children under the age of 18 living in them. Of all households, 68.7% were married-couple households, 12.8% were households with a male householder and no spouse or partner present, and 13.3% were households with a female householder and no spouse or partner present. About 18.2% of all households were made up of individuals and 8.0% had someone living alone who was 65 years of age or older.

There were 1,590 housing units, of which 8.7% were vacant. The homeowner vacancy rate was 1.6% and the rental vacancy rate was 11.9%.

Racial composition as of the 2020 census
Race	Number	Percent
White	3,502	91.8%
Black or African American	8	0.2%
American Indian and Alaska Native	41	1.1%
Asian	14	0.4%
Native Hawaiian and Other Pacific Islander	2	0.1%
Some other race	20	0.5%
Two or more races	226	5.9%
Hispanic or Latino (of any race)	123	3.2%

=== 2000 census ===
As of the 2000 census, there were 2,122 people, 776 households, and 619 families residing in the CDP. The population density was 45.4 inhabitants per square mile (17.5/km^{2}). There were 830 housing units at an average density of 17.7 per square mile (6.8/km^{2}). The racial makeup of the CDP was 97.74% White, 0.09% African American, 1.23% Native American, 0.05% Asian, 0.19% from other races, and 0.71% from two or more races. Hispanic or Latino of any race were 0.90% of the population.

There were 776 households, out of which 37.0% had children under the age of 18 living with them, 69.8% were married couples living together, 5.5% had a female householder with no husband present, and 20.2% were non-families. 16.4% of all households were made up of individuals, and 3.4% had someone living alone who was 65 years of age or older. The average household size was 2.68 and the average family size was 3.00.

In the CDP, the population was spread out, with 26.0% under the age of 18, 5.5% from 18 to 24, 29.8% from 25 to 44, 28.9% from 45 to 64, and 9.8% who were 65 years of age or older. The median age was 39 years. For every 100 females, there were 106.0 males. For every 100 females age 18 and over, there were 104.0 males.

The median income for a household in the CDP was $50,804, and the median income for a family was $54,728. Males had a median income of $32,140 versus $26,563 for females. The per capita income for the CDP was $20,283. About 1.4% of families and 3.8% of the population were below the poverty line, including 3.6% of those under age 18 and 7.5% of those age 65 or over.

== Education ==
For the vast majority of the CDP, Helena Elementary School District and Helena High School District are the respective school districts. A small portion is covered by a unified K-12 school district, East Helena K-12.
