= Canyon Creek, Montana =

Unincorporated community in Montana, United States

- Unincorporated community
- Location within Montana Location within the United States
- Coordinates: 46°48′14″N 112°15′05″W
- Country: United States
- State: Montana
- County: Lewis and Clark

Area
  - Total: 0.73 sq mi (1.90 km^{2})
  - Land: 0.73 sq mi (1.90 km^{2})
  - Water: 0 sq mi (0.00 km^{2})
- Elevation: 4,311 ft (1,314 m)

Population (2020)
  - Total: 47
  - Density: 64.2/sq mi (24.79/km^{2})
- Time zone: UTC-7 (Mountain (MST))
  - Summer (DST): UTC-6 (MDT)
- ZIP code: 59633
- Area code: 406
- GNIS feature ID: 2804300

Canyon Creek is a small community of less than 200 citizens in Lewis and Clark County, Montana, United States. Canyon Creek is located along Secondary Highway 279, 18 miles (29 km) northwest of Helena. The community has an Antique and General Store with a U.S. Post Office, Volunteer Fire Station, Elementary School and a RV Park; it has a zip code of 59633.

The community's name comes from a nearby tributary of the Missouri River, which flows through a canyon.

== Demographics ==
Historical population
Census	Pop.	Note	%±
2020	47		—
U.S. Decennial Census

== Education ==
The elementary school district is Trinity Elementary School District, and the high school district is Helena High School District.
