= Helena Public School District =

School district in Montana, United States

Location
- 55 South Rodney Street; Helena, Montana United States
- Coordinates: 46.5834°N 112.0364°W

District information
- Type: Public
- Established: 19th century
- Superintendent: Tyler Ream

Other information
- Website: www.helenaschools.org

Helena Public Schools is a public school district located in Helena, Montana, United States.

It has two components: Helena Elementary School District and Helena High School District. The National Center for Education Statistics (NCES) code for the elementary district, which covers grades Pre-Kindergarten to 8, is 3000005. The NCES code for the high school district is 3013830.

The elementary school district includes almost all of Helena and all or portions of the following census-designated places: all of Rimini and Unionville; most of Helena Valley Northeast, Helena Valley Northwest, Helena Valley West Central and Helena West Side; and parts of Helena Valley Southeast. The high school district includes those areas and: Canyon Creek, Craig, Marysville, Wolf Creek, and the remainders of Helena Valley Northwest, Helena Valley West Central, and Helena West Side.

== Schools ==
Elementary schools

- Broadwater Elementary School
- Bryant Elementary School
- Central Elementary School
- Four Georgians Elementary School
- Hawthorne Elementary School
- Jefferson Elementary School
- Jim Darcy Elementary School
- Kessler Elementary School
- Rossiter Elementary School
- Smith Elementary School
- Warren Elementary School

Middle schools

- C. R. Anderson Middle School
- Helena Middle School

High schools

- Capital High School
- Helena High School
- Project for Alternative Learning
