= Wolf Creek, Montana =

Unincorporated community in Montana, US

- Unincorporated community
- Location within Montana Location within the United States
- Coordinates: 47°00′21″N 112°04′12″W
- Country: United States
- State: Montana
- County: Lewis and Clark

Area
  - Total: 0.21 sq mi (0.55 km^{2})
  - Land: 0.21 sq mi (0.55 km^{2})
  - Water: 0 sq mi (0.00 km^{2})
- Elevation: 3,563 ft (1,086 m)

Population (2020)
  - Total: 25
  - Density: 117.0/sq mi (45.16/km^{2})
- Time zone: UTC-7 (Mountain (MST))
  - Summer (DST): UTC-6 (MDT)
- ZIP code: 59648
- Area code: 406
- GNIS feature ID: 2804305

Wolf Creek is an unincorporated community in Lewis and Clark County, Montana, United States, along Interstate 15, 28 miles (45 km) north of Helena. Its ZIP code is 59648. As of the 2020 census, Wolf Creek had a population of 25.

In 1887, the Montana Central Railway built its line through the narrow Prickly Pear Canyon, and the town of Wolf Creek, named for the creek, grew to serve the railroad. It later served workers building the Holter Dam from 1908–1910. Interstate 15 split the town in half, nearly obliterating it.

== Demographics ==
Historical population
Census	Pop.	Note	%±
2020	25		—
U.S. Decennial Census

== Education ==
Wolf Creek School District#13, the elementary school district, has one elementary school providing education for grades K-5.

The high school district is Helena High School District. 6-12 students home district is Helena Schools to the south in Lewis and Clark County

== Media ==
The Cascade Courier is a local newspaper. It is printed weekly and is also available online.

== In popular culture ==
- In the movie A River Runs Through It, Wolf Creek is the home of Jessie Burns, the love interest of main character Norman Maclean.
- Wolf Creek was a filming location for parts of the movie Thunderbolt and Lightfoot.
- In Australia, the Seven Network's reality television series The World's Strictest Parents featured a family from Wolf Creek, Montana.
- In the 1970s, Marlboro selected Wolf Creek resident Herf Ingersoll as their "Marlboro Man."

== Climate ==
According to the Köppen Climate Classification system, Wolf Creek has a semi-arid climate, abbreviated "BSk" on climate maps.

Climate data for Wolf Creek, Montana
Month	Jan	Feb	Mar	Apr	May	Jun	Jul	Aug	Sep	Oct	Nov	Dec	Year
Mean daily maximum °F (°C)	35 (2)	39 (4)	46 (8)	57 (14)	67 (19)	75 (24)	85 (29)	84 (29)	72 (22)	60 (16)	46 (8)	38 (3)	59 (15)
Mean daily minimum °F (°C)	18 (−8)	21 (−6)	25 (−4)	33 (1)	41 (5)	48 (9)	54 (12)	52 (11)	45 (7)	39 (4)	30 (−1)	22 (−6)	36 (2)
Average precipitation inches (mm)	0.5 (13)	0.4 (10)	0.6 (15)	1.2 (30)	2.2 (56)	2.6 (66)	1.3 (33)	1.1 (28)	1.3 (33)	0.8 (20)	0.5 (13)	0.5 (13)	12.9 (330)
Source: Weatherbase
