= Clancy, Montana =

- Census-designated place
- Location of Clancy, Montana
- Coordinates: 46°28′29″N 111°59′1″W
- Country: United States
- State: Montana
- County: Jefferson

Area
  - Total: 39.17 sq mi (101.45 km^{2})
  - Land: 39.17 sq mi (101.45 km^{2})
  - Water: 0 sq mi (0.00 km^{2})
- Elevation: 4,242 ft (1,293 m)

Population (2020)
  - Total: 1,851
  - Density: 47.3/sq mi (18.25/km^{2})
- Time zone: UTC-7 (Mountain (MST))
  - Summer (DST): UTC-6 (MDT)
- ZIP code: 59634
- Area code: 406
- FIPS code: 30-15100
- GNIS feature ID: 0800597

Clancy is an unincorporated community and census-designated place (CDP) in Jefferson County, Montana, United States. As of the 2020 census, Clancy had a population of 1,851. It is part of the Helena Micropolitan Statistical Area.

The town was founded in 1873 as a gold camp and named for prospector William Clancey. A fire in 1902 destroyed many of the buildings in town.

== Geography ==
Clancy is located in northern Jefferson County in the valley of Prickly Pear Creek where it is joined by Clancy Creek. Clancy is bordered to the north by Montana City and to the south by Jefferson City. Interstate 15 passes through Clancy, with access from Exit 182. I-15 leads north 12 miles (19 km) to Helena, the state capital, and south 18 miles (29 km) to Boulder, the Jefferson county seat.

According to the United States Census Bureau, the CDP has a total area of 39.2 square miles (101.4 km^{2}), all land. The CDP includes the community of Alhambra, 1 mile (1.6 km) south of Clancy proper.

=== Climate ===
According to the Köppen Climate Classification system, Clancy has a semi-arid climate, abbreviated "BSk" on climate maps.

Climate data for Clancy, 1991–2020 simulated normals (4255 ft elevation)
Month	Jan	Feb	Mar	Apr	May	Jun	Jul	Aug	Sep	Oct	Nov	Dec	Year
Mean daily maximum °F (°C)	34.2 (1.2)	37.6 (3.1)	46.6 (8.1)	55.0 (12.8)	64.4 (18.0)	72.9 (22.7)	83.7 (28.7)	82.9 (28.3)	72.1 (22.3)	57.2 (14.0)	42.8 (6.0)	34.0 (1.1)	57.0 (13.9)
Daily mean °F (°C)	23.9 (−4.5)	26.6 (−3.0)	34.5 (1.4)	42.3 (5.7)	51.1 (10.6)	58.8 (14.9)	66.9 (19.4)	65.7 (18.7)	56.5 (13.6)	44.2 (6.8)	32.2 (0.1)	24.1 (−4.4)	43.9 (6.6)
Mean daily minimum °F (°C)	13.6 (−10.2)	15.8 (−9.0)	22.5 (−5.3)	29.5 (−1.4)	37.9 (3.3)	45.0 (7.2)	50.4 (10.2)	48.4 (9.1)	40.8 (4.9)	31.1 (−0.5)	21.6 (−5.8)	14.0 (−10.0)	30.9 (−0.6)
Average precipitation inches (mm)	0.65 (16.63)	0.69 (17.55)	0.78 (19.75)	1.48 (37.67)	2.27 (57.56)	2.52 (64.03)	1.25 (31.87)	1.16 (29.36)	1.21 (30.64)	1.15 (29.23)	0.85 (21.63)	0.71 (18.15)	14.72 (374.07)
Average dew point °F (°C)	14.5 (−9.7)	15.6 (−9.1)	20.8 (−6.2)	26.8 (−2.9)	34.7 (1.5)	42.3 (5.7)	44.8 (7.1)	42.6 (5.9)	36.9 (2.7)	29.3 (−1.5)	20.7 (−6.3)	14.5 (−9.7)	28.6 (−1.9)
Source: PRISM Climate Group

== Economy ==
Most people who live in and around Clancy work in Montana's capital city of Helena, which is a short drive north on I-15. Two restaurants operate in Clancy. Elkhorn Health and Rehabilitation runs a small nursing home in the community, and Clancy Elementary School, a K-8 institution, employs more than thirty people.

== Demographics ==
Historical population
Census	Pop.	Note	%±
2000	1,406		—
2010	1,661		18.1%
2020	1,851		11.4%
U.S. Decennial Census

=== 2020 census ===
As of the 2020 census, Clancy had a population of 1,851. The median age was 48.4 years. 22.2% of residents were under the age of 18 and 24.8% of residents were 65 years of age or older. For every 100 females there were 100.3 males, and for every 100 females age 18 and over there were 101.4 males age 18 and over.

0.0% of residents lived in urban areas, while 100.0% lived in rural areas.

There were 700 households in Clancy, of which 32.9% had children under the age of 18 living in them. Of all households, 72.4% were married-couple households, 12.7% were households with a male householder and no spouse or partner present, and 11.0% were households with a female householder and no spouse or partner present. About 16.4% of all households were made up of individuals and 7.9% had someone living alone who was 65 years of age or older.

There were 738 housing units, of which 5.1% were vacant. The homeowner vacancy rate was 0.0% and the rental vacancy rate was 11.7%.

Racial composition as of the 2020 census
Race	Number	Percent
White	1,708	92.3%
Black or African American	0	0.0%
American Indian and Alaska Native	18	1.0%
Asian	8	0.4%
Native Hawaiian and Other Pacific Islander	0	0.0%
Some other race	4	0.2%
Two or more races	113	6.1%
Hispanic or Latino (of any race)	48	2.6%

=== 2010 census ===
As of the 2010 census, there were 1,661 people, an 18% increase from the 2000 census.

=== 2000 census ===
In 2000 there were 1,406 people, in 540 households, and 428 families residing in the CDP. The population density was 39.3 inhabitants per square mile (15.2/km^{2}). There were 559 housing units at an average density of 15.6 per square mile (6.0/km^{2}). The racial makeup of the CDP was 96.23% White, 0.14% African American, 0.92% Native American, 0.57% Asian, 0.43% from other races, and 1.71% from two or more races. Hispanic or Latino of any race were 1.99% of the population.

There were 540 households, out of which 36.7% had children under the age of 18 living with them, 70.4% were married couples living together, 6.1% had a female householder with no husband present, and 20.6% were non-families. 15.7% of all households were made up of individuals, and 5.4% had someone living alone who was 65 years of age or older. The average household size was 2.60 and the average family size was 2.93.

In the CDP, the population was spread out, with 26.3% under the age of 18, 5.2% from 18 to 24, 26.3% from 25 to 44, 34.4% from 45 to 64, and 7.8% who were 65 years of age or older. The median age was 42 years. For every 100 females, there were 103.2 males. For every 100 females age 18 and over, there were 103.5 males.

The median income for a household in the CDP was $52,938, and the median income for a family was $59,766. Males had a median income of $38,750 versus $24,091 for females. The per capita income for the CDP was $23,492. About 2.0% of families and 3.3% of the population were below the poverty line, including 3.1% of those under age 18 and 3.9% of those age 65 or over.

== Education ==
Clancy Elementary School District is the elementary school district for the majority of the CDP, while some parts are in the Montana City Elementary School District. All residents are assigned to the Jefferson High School District.

Jefferson High School in Boulder serves the Clancy students.

The North Jefferson County Library has a location in Clancy.
