= Jefferson City, Montana =

- Census-designated place
- Location of Jefferson City, Montana
- Coordinates: 46°23′12″N 112°2′28″W
- Country: United States
- State: Montana
- County: Jefferson

Area
  - Total: 23.22 sq mi (60.13 km^{2})
  - Land: 23.22 sq mi (60.13 km^{2})
  - Water: 0 sq mi (0.00 km^{2})
- Elevation: 4,564 ft (1,391 m)

Population (2020)
  - Total: 597
  - Density: 25.7/sq mi (9.93/km^{2})
- Time zone: UTC-7 (Mountain (MST))
  - Summer (DST): UTC-6 (MDT)
- ZIP code: 59638
- Area code: 406
- FIPS code: 30-39400
- GNIS feature ID: 0785437

Jefferson City is an unincorporated community and census-designated place (CDP) in Jefferson County, Montana, United States. As of the 2020 census, Jefferson City had a population of 597. It is part of the Helena Micropolitan Statistical Area.

The community began as a stop along the Fort Benton and Virginia City stage line. It took its name when Jefferson County was named one of Montana Territory’s original counties on February 2, 1865.

Summer activities include the Tizer Botanic Gardens & Arboretum with its 100 varieties of roses and 150 varieties of clematis.

== Geography ==
Jefferson City is located in northern Jefferson County in the valley of Prickly Pear Creek. It is bordered to the north by Clancy. Interstate 15 passes through the community, with access from Exit 176. I-15 leads north 18 miles (29 km) to Helena and south 12 miles (19 km) to Boulder, the Jefferson county seat.

According to the United States Census Bureau, the Jefferson City CDP has a total area of 23.2 square miles (60.1 km^{2}), all land.

=== Climate ===
Climate data for Tizer Gardens, Montana, 1991–2020 normals, 2011-2020 snowfall: 4672ft (1424m)
| Month | Jan | Feb | Mar | Apr | May | Jun | Jul | Aug | Sep | Oct | Nov | Dec | Year |
|---|---|---|---|---|---|---|---|---|---|---|---|---|---|
| Record high °F (°C) | 59 (15) | 62 (17) | 73 (23) | 80 (27) | 87 (31) | 97 (36) | 96 (36) | 97 (36) | 95 (35) | 88 (31) | 70 (21) | 60 (16) | 97 (36) |
| Mean maximum °F (°C) | 52.6 (11.4) | 53.2 (11.8) | 63.0 (17.2) | 72.5 (22.5) | 79.7 (26.5) | 87.5 (30.8) | 92.9 (33.8) | 93.3 (34.1) | 88.4 (31.3) | 77.6 (25.3) | 62.2 (16.8) | 52.2 (11.2) | 94.5 (34.7) |
| Mean daily maximum °F (°C) | 35.4 (1.9) | 36.1 (2.3) | 45.5 (7.5) | 53.9 (12.2) | 62.2 (16.8) | 70.5 (21.4) | 81.4 (27.4) | 81.7 (27.6) | 71.0 (21.7) | 55.9 (13.3) | 42.6 (5.9) | 33.4 (0.8) | 55.8 (13.2) |
| Daily mean °F (°C) | 22.9 (−5.1) | 23.7 (−4.6) | 31.8 (−0.1) | 39.4 (4.1) | 47.4 (8.6) | 54.7 (12.6) | 62.9 (17.2) | 62.2 (16.8) | 53.1 (11.7) | 41.2 (5.1) | 30.8 (−0.7) | 21.9 (−5.6) | 41.0 (5.0) |
| Mean daily minimum °F (°C) | 10.3 (−12.1) | 11.2 (−11.6) | 18.1 (−7.7) | 25.0 (−3.9) | 32.5 (0.3) | 39.0 (3.9) | 44.4 (6.9) | 42.7 (5.9) | 35.3 (1.8) | 26.4 (−3.1) | 18.9 (−7.3) | 10.3 (−12.1) | 26.2 (−3.3) |
| Mean minimum °F (°C) | −13.4 (−25.2) | −9.6 (−23.1) | −1.7 (−18.7) | 12.3 (−10.9) | 20.5 (−6.4) | 28.9 (−1.7) | 34.5 (1.4) | 34.0 (1.1) | 25.0 (−3.9) | 12.3 (−10.9) | −4.8 (−20.4) | −13.4 (−25.2) | −23.2 (−30.7) |
| Record low °F (°C) | −21 (−29) | −35 (−37) | −40 (−40) | −2 (−19) | 13 (−11) | 22 (−6) | 26 (−3) | 28 (−2) | 16 (−9) | −9 (−23) | −18 (−28) | −30 (−34) | −40 (−40) |
| Average precipitation inches (mm) | 0.80 (20) | 0.81 (21) | 1.04 (26) | 2.03 (52) | 2.76 (70) | 3.13 (80) | 1.39 (35) | 1.31 (33) | 1.42 (36) | 1.34 (34) | 0.93 (24) | 0.86 (22) | 17.82 (453) |
| Average snowfall inches (cm) | 15.8 (40) | 22.1 (56) | 13.6 (35) | 14.3 (36) | 1.4 (3.6) | 0.0 (0.0) | 0.0 (0.0) | 0.0 (0.0) | 2.7 (6.9) | 9.4 (24) | 15.0 (38) | 18.5 (47) | 112.8 (286.5) |
Source 1: NOAA
Source 2: XMACIS2 (snowfall, records & monthly max/mins)

== Demographics ==
Historical population
| Census | Pop. | Note | %± |
|---|---|---|---|
| 2020 | 597 | | — |
U.S. Decennial Census

As of the census of 2000, there were 295 people, 110 households, and 85 families residing in the CDP. The population density was 24.5 inhabitants per square mile (9.5/km^{2}). There were 115 housing units at an average density of 9.5 per square mile (3.7/km^{2}). The racial makeup of the CDP was 95.59% White, 2.03% Native American, 1.36% Asian, 0.34% from other races, and 0.68% from two or more races. Hispanic or Latino of any race were 0.34% of the population.

There were 110 households, out of which 33.6% had children under the age of 18 living with them, 69.1% were married couples living together, 4.5% had a female householder with no husband present, and 22.7% were non-families. 20.0% of all households were made up of individuals, and 4.5% had someone living alone who was 65 years of age or older. The average household size was 2.68 and the average family size was 3.11.

In the CDP, the population was spread out, with 25.4% under the age of 18, 5.8% from 18 to 24, 30.8% from 25 to 44, 27.5% from 45 to 64, and 10.5% who were 65 years of age or older. The median age was 40 years. For every 100 females, there were 99.3 males. For every 100 females age 18 and over, there were 105.6 males.

The median income for a household in the CDP was $53,125, and the median income for a family was $52,917. Males had a median income of $28,125 versus $32,500 for females. The per capita income for the CDP was $21,953. None of the families and 1.4% of the population were living below the poverty line.

== Education ==
The school districts for the community are Clancy Elementary School District and Jefferson High School District.

Jefferson High School in Boulder serves the Jefferson City students.

== Notable person ==
- Anne Appleby, landscape artist
