= Lewis and Clark County, Montana =

County in Montana, United States

- County
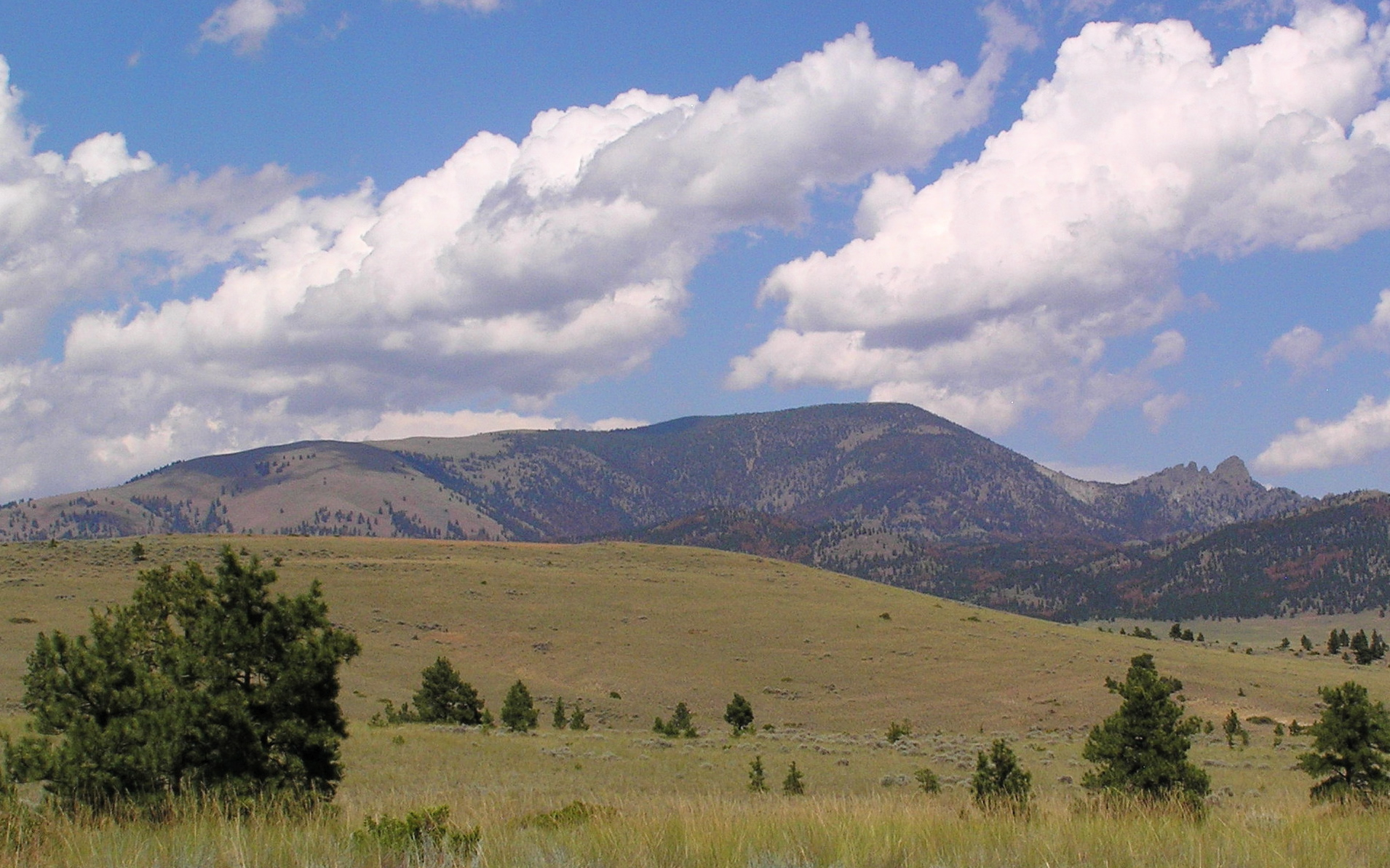
- The "Sleeping Giant" formation north of Helena

- Seal

- Location within the U.S. state of Montana
- Coordinates: 47.11°N 112.38°W
- Country: United States
- State: Montana
- Founded: June 2, 1865
- Named for: Meriwether Lewis and William Clark
- Seat: Helena
- Largest city: Helena

Area
  - Total: 3,498 sq mi (9,060 km^{2})
  - Land: 3,459 sq mi (8,960 km^{2})
  - Water: 39 sq mi (100 km^{2}) 1.1%

Population (2020)
  - Total: 70,973
  - Estimate (2025): 75,331 ▲
  - Density: 21.8/sq mi (8.4/km^{2})
- Time zone: UTC−7 (Mountain)
  - Summer (DST): UTC−6 (MDT)
- Congressional district: 2nd
- Website: www.lccountymt.gov/home.html
- Montana county number 05

Lewis and Clark County is a county located in the U.S. state of Montana. As of the 2020 census, the population was 70,973, making it the 4th least populous capital county in the United States. Its county seat and most populous city is Helena, the state capital. The numerical designation for Lewis and Clark County (used in the issuance of the state's license plates) is 5. The county was established on June 2, 1865, as one of the nine original counties of the Territory of Montana named Edgerton County in honor of Sidney Edgerton, first Governor of the Territory of Montana, and was renamed Lewis and Clark County on March 1, 1868, in honor of explorers Meriwether Lewis and William Clark. Lewis and Clark County is part of the Helena, Montana Micropolitan Statistical Area, and comprises the entirety of the Helena media market.

== Geography ==
According to the United States Census Bureau, the county has a total area of 3,498 square miles (9,060 km^{2}), of which 3,459 square miles (8,960 km^{2}) is land and 39 square miles (100 km^{2}) (1.1%) is water.

=== Communities ===
==== Cities ====
- Helena (county seat)
- East Helena

==== Census-designated places ====
- Augusta
- Canyon Creek
- Craig
- Gilman
- Helena Valley Northeast
- Helena Valley Northwest
- Helena Valley Southeast
- Helena Valley West Central
- Helena West Side
- Lincoln
- Marysville
- Milford Colony
- Rimini
- Unionville
- Wolf Creek
- York

==== Other unincorporated communities ====
- Austin
- Bald Butte
- Birdseye
- Canyon Ferry
- Dearborn (partially within Cascade County)
- Fort Harrison Army Air Park
- Four Range
- Frontier Town
- Gearing
- La Chapelle Place
- Nelson
- Silver City
- Stoner Place
- Weed
- Wilborn
- Winston

=== Major highways ===
- I-15
- US 12
- US 287
- MT 21
- MT 200

=== Adjacent counties ===
- Teton County - north
- Cascade County - east
- Meagher County - east
- Broadwater County - southeast
- Jefferson County - south
- Powell County - west
- Flathead County - northwest

=== National protected areas ===
- Flathead National Forest (part)
- Helena National Forest (part)
- Lewis and Clark National Forest (part)
- Lolo National Forest (part)
- Rocky Mountain Front Conservation Area (part)

== Demographics ==
Historical population
Census	Pop.	Note	%±
1870	5,040		—
1880	6,521		29.4%
1890	19,145		193.6%
1900	19,171		0.1%
1910	21,853		14.0%
1920	18,660		−14.6%
1930	18,224		−2.3%
1940	22,131		21.4%
1950	24,540		10.9%
1960	28,006		14.1%
1970	33,281		18.8%
1980	43,039		29.3%
1990	47,495		10.4%
2000	55,716		17.3%
2010	63,395		13.8%
2020	70,973		12.0%
2025 (est.)	75,331	▲	6.1%
U.S. Decennial Census:

=== 2020 census ===
As of the 2020 census, the county had a population of 70,973. Of the residents, 21.5% were under the age of 18 and 19.5% were 65 years of age or older; the median age was 41.3 years. For every 100 females there were 97.0 males, and for every 100 females age 18 and over there were 95.6 males. 73.8% of residents lived in urban areas and 26.2% lived in rural areas.

The racial makeup of the county was 88.8% White, 0.4% Black or African American, 1.9% American Indian and Alaska Native, 0.8% Asian, 0.9% from some other race, and 7.1% from two or more races. Hispanic or Latino residents of any race comprised 3.7% of the population.

There were 30,204 households in the county, of which 26.2% had children under the age of 18 living with them and 25.5% had a female householder with no spouse or partner present. About 31.6% of all households were made up of individuals and 13.1% had someone living alone who was 65 years of age or older.

There were 33,599 housing units, of which 10.1% were vacant. Among occupied housing units, 68.3% were owner-occupied and 31.7% were renter-occupied. The homeowner vacancy rate was 1.4% and the rental vacancy rate was 5.1%.

=== 2010 census ===
As of the 2010 census, there were 63,395 people, 26,694 households, and 16,705 families in the county. The population density was 18.3 inhabitants per square mile (7.1/km^{2}). There were 30,180 housing units at an average density of 8.7 per square mile (3.4/km^{2}). The racial makeup of the county was 94.0% white, 2.1% American Indian, 0.6% Asian, 0.3% black or African American, 0.1% Pacific islander, 0.5% from other races, and 2.4% from two or more races. Those of Hispanic or Latino origin made up 2.5% of the population. In terms of ancestry, 29.2% were German, 19.3% were Irish, 15.0% were English, 8.9% were Norwegian, and 5.1% were American.

Of the 26,694 households, 28.8% had children under the age of 18 living with them, 49.0% were married couples living together, 9.4% had a female householder with no husband present, 37.4% were non-families, and 30.7% of all households were made up of individuals. The average household size was 2.30 and the average family size was 2.87. The median age was 40.9 years.

The median income for a household in the county was $50,238 and the median income for a family was $65,573. Males had a median income of $44,476 versus $34,893 for females. The per capita income for the county was $25,894. About 5.8% of families and 9.7% of the population were below the poverty line, including 10.2% of those under age 18 and 4.1% of those age 65 or over.

== Politics ==
Lewis and Clark County leans slightly Republican, but it has voted for Democratic candidates three times since 1964. Bill Clinton won by nearly seven percentage points in 1992, but Bob Dole won by 130 votes in 1996. Barack Obama carried the county in 2008 but lost it to Mitt Romney in 2012. In recent elections, the county has voted Republican but only by narrow margins.

United States presidential election results for Lewis and Clark County, Montana
Year	Republican		Democratic		Third party(ies)	
Year	No.	%	No.	%	No.	%
1892	2,014	38.14%	2,093	39.64%	1,173	22.22%
1896	1,057	21.07%	3,939	78.53%	20	0.40%
1900	2,043	42.03%	2,763	56.84%	55	1.13%
1904	2,505	54.60%	1,543	33.63%	540	11.77%
1908	2,033	45.89%	2,062	46.55%	335	7.56%
1912	1,062	24.50%	1,505	34.72%	1,768	40.78%
1916	3,423	42.99%	4,337	54.47%	202	2.54%
1920	4,348	62.90%	2,413	34.91%	152	2.20%
1924	3,433	49.93%	1,869	27.19%	1,573	22.88%
1928	4,441	57.35%	3,278	42.33%	25	0.32%
1932	3,671	42.71%	4,714	54.84%	211	2.45%
1936	2,951	33.82%	5,614	64.34%	160	1.83%
1940	4,762	44.58%	5,814	54.42%	107	1.00%
1944	4,482	48.41%	4,737	51.17%	39	0.42%
1948	5,174	50.85%	4,745	46.63%	257	2.53%
1952	7,663	62.58%	4,563	37.26%	20	0.16%
1956	7,959	64.41%	4,397	35.59%	0	0.00%
1960	7,260	54.65%	6,008	45.22%	17	0.13%
1964	6,155	44.97%	7,506	54.84%	26	0.19%
1968	7,979	56.53%	5,379	38.11%	757	5.36%
1972	10,719	61.90%	6,081	35.12%	516	2.98%
1976	10,155	54.84%	8,118	43.84%	244	1.32%
1980	12,128	57.18%	6,815	32.13%	2,269	10.70%
1984	13,569	59.97%	8,768	38.75%	289	1.28%
1988	10,946	46.91%	11,932	51.14%	456	1.95%
1992	9,351	35.72%	11,117	42.47%	5,711	21.82%
1996	11,665	43.94%	11,535	43.45%	3,347	12.61%
2000	15,091	55.34%	9,982	36.61%	2,196	8.05%
2004	16,494	55.27%	12,717	42.61%	632	2.12%
2008	14,966	45.31%	17,114	51.82%	949	2.87%
2012	16,803	50.43%	15,620	46.88%	895	2.69%
2016	16,895	47.87%	14,478	41.02%	3,923	11.11%
2020	21,409	50.64%	19,743	46.70%	1,121	2.65%
2024	21,479	51.11%	19,085	45.41%	1,461	3.48%

== Education ==
School districts include:

K–12 (Unified):

- East Helena K–12 Schools
- Lincoln K–12 Schools

High school:

- Augusta High School District
- Helena High School District

Elementary school:

- Auchard Creek Elementary School District
- Augusta Elementary School District
- Helena Elementary School District
- Trinity Elementary School District
- Wolf Creek Elementary School District

== Notable people ==
- W. A. Boyle, president of the UMW, was born in Bald Butte, approximately two miles southwest of Marysville.
- Seth Bullock, sheriff of Lewis and Clark County, later sheriff of Deadwood, South Dakota.
- Ted Kaczynski, known as the Unabomber, lived in a cabin in Lincoln from 1971 to 1996, during which time he conducted his infamous bombing campaign.
- Brian Knight, Major League Baseball umpire
- Mike McGrath, Chief Justice of the Montana Supreme Court, former Montana Attorney General, former County Attorney of Lewis and Clark County.
- Johnny Miljus, major league baseball pitcher, retired to Fort Harrison in Lewis and Clark County.
- The governor of Montana, whose official residence is in the state capital of Helena.

== See also ==
- List of counties in Montana
- List of lakes in Lewis and Clark County, Montana
- List of mountains in Lewis and Clark County, Montana
- National Register of Historic Places listings in Lewis and Clark County, Montana
