= Helena Valley Southeast, Montana =

- Census-designated place
- Location of Helena Valley Southeast, Montana
- Coordinates: 46°37′20″N 111°53′24″W
- Country: United States
- State: Montana
- County: Lewis and Clark

Area
  - Total: 22.41 sq mi (58.04 km^{2})
  - Land: 21.47 sq mi (55.61 km^{2})
  - Water: 0.94 sq mi (2.44 km^{2})
- Elevation: 3,773 ft (1,150 m)

Population (2020)
  - Total: 9,168
  - Density: 427.0/sq mi (164.87/km^{2})
- Time zone: UTC-7 (Mountain (MST))
  - Summer (DST): UTC-6 (MDT)
- Area code: 406
- FIPS code: 30-35634
- GNIS feature ID: 2408373

Helena Valley Southeast is a census-designated place (CDP) in Lewis and Clark County, Montana, United States. As of the 2020 census, Helena Valley Southeast had a population of 9,168. It is part of the Helena Micropolitan Statistical Area.

== Geography ==
Helena Valley Southeast is located in southern Lewis and Clark County. It is bordered to the southwest by the city of Helena, the state capital, and to the south by the city of East Helena. To the north it is bordered by the Helena Valley Northeast CDP.

Canyon Ferry Road is the main east-west street through the community. Downtown Helena is approximately 7 miles (11 km) southwest of the center of the CDP.

According to the United States Census Bureau, the CDP has a total area of 14.4 square miles (37.2 km^{2}), of which 0.04 square miles (0.1 km^{2}), or 0.37%, is water.

== Demographics ==
Historical population
Census	Pop.	Note	%±
2020	9,168		—
U.S. Decennial Census

=== 2020 census ===
As of the 2020 census, Helena Valley Southeast had a population of 9,168. The median age was 38.9 years. 26.2% of residents were under the age of 18 and 14.1% of residents were 65 years of age or older. For every 100 females there were 101.1 males, and for every 100 females age 18 and over there were 99.7 males age 18 and over.

84.2% of residents lived in urban areas, while 15.8% lived in rural areas.

There were 3,475 households in Helena Valley Southeast, of which 32.2% had children under the age of 18 living in them. Of all households, 55.5% were married-couple households, 16.6% were households with a male householder and no spouse or partner present, and 20.3% were households with a female householder and no spouse or partner present. About 22.3% of all households were made up of individuals and 9.0% had someone living alone who was 65 years of age or older.

There were 3,601 housing units, of which 3.5% were vacant. The homeowner vacancy rate was 1.0% and the rental vacancy rate was 2.4%.

Racial composition as of the 2020 census
Race	Number	Percent
White	8,009	87.4%
Black or African American	15	0.2%
American Indian and Alaska Native	247	2.7%
Asian	57	0.6%
Native Hawaiian and Other Pacific Islander	23	0.3%
Some other race	68	0.7%
Two or more races	749	8.2%
Hispanic or Latino (of any race)	298	3.3%

=== 2000 census ===
As of the census of 2000, there were 7,141 people, 2,495 households, and 1,941 families residing in the CDP. The population density was 441.4 inhabitants per square mile (170.4/km^{2}). There were 2,590 housing units at an average density of 160.1 per square mile (61.8/km^{2}). The racial makeup of the CDP was 93.60% White, 0.27% African American, 2.86% Native American, 0.38% Asian, 0.01% Pacific Islander, 0.49% from other races, and 2.39% from two or more races. Hispanic or Latino of any race were 1.93% of the population.

There were 2,495 households, out of which 47.9% had children under the age of 18 living with them, 59.5% were married couples living together, 12.8% had a female householder with no husband present, and 22.2% were non-families. 16.6% of all households were made up of individuals, and 4.1% had someone living alone who was 65 years of age or older. The average household size was 2.86 and the average family size was 3.23.

In the CDP, the population was spread out, with 34.4% under the age of 18, 7.1% from 18 to 24, 33.7% from 25 to 44, 19.5% from 45 to 64, and 5.4% who were 65 years of age or older. The median age was 31 years. For every 100 females, there were 99.6 males. For every 100 females age 18 and over, there were 96.9 males.

The median income for a household in the CDP was $38,147, and the median income for a family was $41,993. Males had a median income of $32,343 versus $21,112 for females. The per capita income for the CDP was $14,349. About 5.6% of families and 7.4% of the population were below the poverty line, including 9.4% of those under age 18 and 5.9% of those age 65 or over.

== Education ==
For the north and west portions, Helena Elementary School District and Helena High School District are the respective school districts. The south and east portions are covered by a unified K-12 school district, East Helena K-12.
