= Helena Valley Northwest, Montana =

- CDP
- Location of Helena Valley Northwest, Montana
- Coordinates: 397046°43′45″N 112°04′38″W
- Country: United States
- State: Montana
- County: Lewis and Clark

Area
  - Total: 16.38 sq mi (42.42 km^{2})
  - Land: 16.38 sq mi (42.42 km^{2})
  - Water: 0.0039 sq mi (0.01 km^{2})
- Elevation: 3,970 ft (1,210 m)

Population (2020)
  - Total: 4,705
  - Density: 287.3/sq mi (110.92/km^{2})
- Time zone: UTC-7 (Mountain (MST))
  - Summer (DST): UTC-6 (MDT)
- Area code: 406
- FIPS code: 30-35631
- GNIS feature ID: 2408372

Helena Valley Northwest is a census-designated place (CDP) in Lewis and Clark County, Montana, United States. As of the 2020 census, Helena Valley Northwest had a population of 4,705. It is part of the Helena Micropolitan Statistical Area.

== Geography ==
According to the United States Census Bureau, the CDP has a total area of 16.4 square miles (42 km^{2}), all land.

== Demographics ==
Historical population
| Census | Pop. | Note | %± |
|---|---|---|---|
| 2020 | 4,705 | | — |
U.S. Decennial Census

=== 2020 census ===
As of the 2020 census, Helena Valley Northwest had a population of 4,705. The median age was 36.7 years. 27.8% of residents were under the age of 18 and 12.7% of residents were 65 years of age or older. For every 100 females there were 97.3 males, and for every 100 females age 18 and over there were 97.7 males age 18 and over.

60.8% of residents lived in urban areas, while 39.2% lived in rural areas.

There were 1,653 households in Helena Valley Northwest, of which 37.7% had children under the age of 18 living in them. Of all households, 66.0% were married-couple households, 13.2% were households with a male householder and no spouse or partner present, and 14.0% were households with a female householder and no spouse or partner present. About 15.9% of all households were made up of individuals and 6.4% had someone living alone who was 65 years of age or older.

There were 1,698 housing units, of which 2.7% were vacant. The homeowner vacancy rate was 1.3% and the rental vacancy rate was 0.0%.

Racial composition as of the 2020 census
| Race | Number | Percent |
|---|---|---|
| White | 4,152 | 88.2% |
| Black or African American | 12 | 0.3% |
| American Indian and Alaska Native | 79 | 1.7% |
| Asian | 37 | 0.8% |
| Native Hawaiian and Other Pacific Islander | 0 | 0.0% |
| Some other race | 50 | 1.1% |
| Two or more races | 375 | 8.0% |
| Hispanic or Latino (of any race) | 191 | 4.1% |

=== 2000 census ===
As of the 2000 census, there were 2,082 people, 741 households, and 603 families residing in the CDP. The population density was 127.3 inhabitants per square mile (49.2/km^{2}). There were 769 housing units at an average density of 47.0 per square mile (18.1/km^{2}). The racial makeup of the CDP was 96.06% White, 0.10% African American, 1.78% Native American, 0.72% Asian, 0.05% Pacific Islander, 0.43% from other races, and 0.86% from two or more races. Hispanic or Latino of any race were 1.44% of the population.

There were 741 households, out of which 41.2% had children under the age of 18 living with them, 69.8% were married couples living together, 8.5% had a female householder with no husband present, and 18.5% were non-families. 14.7% of all households were made up of individuals, and 2.4% had someone living alone who was 65 years of age or older. The average household size was 2.81 and the average family size was 3.09.

In the CDP, the population was spread out, with 29.4% under the age of 18, 6.9% from 18 to 24, 32.3% from 25 to 44, 26.9% from 45 to 64, and 4.5% who were 65 years of age or older. The median age was 35 years. For every 100 females, there were 103.5 males. For every 100 females age 18 and over, there were 99.9 males.

The median income for a household in the CDP was $45,385, and the median income for a family was $50,714. Males had a median income of $33,906 versus $24,773 for females. The per capita income for the CDP was $17,910. About 5.6% of families and 8.2% of the population were below the poverty line, including 8.6% of those under age 18 and none of those age 65 or over.

== Education ==
For almost all of the CDP, Helena Elementary School District is the elementary school district, while Trinity Elementary School District covers a small part of the CDP. Helena High School District covers the entire CDP.
