= National Register of Historic Places listings in Lewis and Clark County, Montana =

Location of Lewis and Clark County in Montana

This is a list of the National Register of Historic Places listings in Lewis and Clark County, Montana.

This is intended to be a complete list of the properties and districts on the National Register of Historic Places in Lewis and Clark County, Montana, United States. The locations of National Register properties and districts for which the latitude and longitude coordinates are included below, may be seen in a map.

There are 80 properties and districts listed on the National Register in the county.

This National Park Service list is complete through NPS recent listings posted October 16, 2026.

== Current listings ==
	Name on the Register	Image	Date listed	Location	City or town	Description
1	Algeria Shrine Temple	Algeria Shrine Temple	April 14, 1988 (#88000434)	Neill and Park Aves. 46°35′43″N 112°02′21″W	Helena	
2	Alice Creek Historic District	Alice Creek Historic District	June 6, 2007 (#06000531)	Helena National Forest; 47°08′22″N 112°27′30″W	Lincoln	
3	Appleton House No. 9	Appleton House No. 9	November 7, 1995 (#95001264)	1999 Euclid Ave. 46°36′20″N 112°03′52″W	Helena	
4	Appleton House No. 13	Appleton House No. 13	October 25, 1982 (#82000593)	2200 Cannon; 46°36′24″N 112°04′05″W	Helena	
5	Joshua and Martha Armitage House	Joshua and Martha Armitage House	May 10, 2005 (#05000408)	1117 E. Broadway; 46°35′04″N 112°01′16″W	Helena	
6	Benton Avenue Cemetery	Benton Avenue Cemetery	July 24, 2003 (#03000689)	1800 N. Benton Ave. 46°36′16″N 112°02′31″W	Helena	
7	Charles A. Broadwater House	Charles A. Broadwater House	August 27, 2008 (#08000825)	1104 Williams St. 46°36′21″N 112°05′19″W	Helena	
8	Cathedral of Saint Helena	Cathedral of Saint Helena	April 30, 1980 (#80004270)	530 N. Ewing St. 46°35′25″N 112°01′57″W	Helena	
9	Childs Carriage House	Childs Carriage House	November 7, 1995 (#95001263)	318 E. 6th Ave. 46°35′15″N 112°02′00″W	Helena	
10	William C. Crum House	William C. Crum House	May 30, 1997 (#97000502)	535 5th Ave. 46°35′09″N 112°01′50″W	Helena	
11	Crump-Howard House	Crump-Howard House	April 24, 2017 (#100000914)	1003 9th Ave. 46°35′19″N 112°01′25″W	Helena	
12	D.H. Cuthbert House	D.H. Cuthbert House	May 4, 1995 (#95000536)	602 N. Ewing; 46°35′28″N 112°01′53″W	Helena	
13	Dearborn River High Bridge	Dearborn River High Bridge	December 18, 2003 (#03001298)	15 miles (24 km) southwest of Augusta on Bean Lake Rd. 47°16′52″N 112°23′25″W	Augusta	
14	Donovan-Mayer House	Donovan-Mayer House	December 28, 2005 (#05001471)	46 S. Howie St. 46°35′14″N 112°02′38″W	Helena	
15	Dorsey Grocery and Residence	Dorsey Grocery and Residence	April 24, 2017 (#100000915)	401 N. Hoback St. 46°35′17″N 112°01′32″W	Helena	
16	Eagle's Site	Eagle's Site	October 7, 1993 (#93000995)	Address restricted	Helena	part of the Archeological Resources of the Upper Missouri River Corridor Multiple Property Submission (MPS)
17	Christmas Gift Evans House	Christmas Gift Evans House	April 16, 1980 (#80004271)	404 N. Benton Ave. 46°35′27″N 112°02′27″W	Helena	
18	Robert and Elizabeth Fisk House	Robert and Elizabeth Fisk House	January 17, 2007 (#06001248)	319 N. Rodney St. 46°35′15″N 112°01′56″W	Helena	
19	Forestvale Cemetery	Forestvale Cemetery	February 21, 1990 (#90000145)	490 Forestvale Rd. 46°39′22″N 112°02′09″W	Helena	
20	Former Montana Executive Mansion	Former Montana Executive Mansion	April 28, 1970 (#70000357)	6th Ave. and Ewing St. 46°35′16″N 112°02′03″W	Helena	
21	Fort Harrison Veterans' Hospital Historic District	Fort Harrison Veterans' Hospital Historic District	December 20, 2016 (#16000874)	2 mi. NW. of Helena; 46°37′05″N 112°06′06″W	Helena vicinity	
22	Gehring Ranch	Gehring Ranch	August 28, 2017 (#100001504)	5488 Lincoln Rd. W. 46°43′31″N 112°08′28″W	Helena vicinity	
23	Gilman State Bank	Gilman State Bank	December 1, 1983 (#83003993)	Main St. 47°30′35″N 112°21′34″W	Gilman	
24	Gilpatrick-Root House	Gilpatrick-Root House	August 10, 2005 (#05000883)	604 Dearborn Ave. 46°35′35″N 112°02′32″W	Helena	
25	Haight-Bridgewater House	Haight-Bridgewater House	March 14, 2014 (#14000080)	502 Peosta Ave. 46°36′09″N 112°02′30″W	Helena	
26	Hauser Mansion	Hauser Mansion	February 12, 1979 (#79001404)	720 Madison Ave. 46°35′43″N 112°02′39″W	Helena	
27	Helena Historic District	Helena Historic District	June 2, 1972 (#72000737)	Irregular pattern from Hauser Boulevard to Acropolis and between Garfield and Rodney Sts.; also roughly bounded by Cruse, Neill and Park Aves., and Lawrence; also bounded by E. 6th, N. Davis, Broadway, and N. Rodney Sts. 46°34′34″N 112°02′26″W	Helena	Second and third sets of boundaries represent boundary increases of June 14, 1990 and October 7, 1993
28	Helena Railroad Depot Historic District	Helena Railroad Depot Historic District	December 15, 2004 (#03001330)	Roughly bounded by Railroad and Helena Aves., Gallatin St., N. Sanders St., and N. Harris St. 46°35′58″N 112°00′52″W	Helena	
29	Helena South-Central Historic District	Helena South-Central Historic District	July 28, 1986 (#86002274)	Roughly bounded by Broadway, S. Davis St., the city limits, and S. Warren St. 46°34′52″N 112°02′15″W	Helena	
30	Helena West Main Street Historic District	Helena West Main Street Historic District	February 22, 1996 (#96000119)	500-600 blocks of W. Main St. 46°34′43″N 112°03′03″W	Helena	
31	Joe and Carrie Hilger Ranch	Joe and Carrie Hilger Ranch	August 31, 2001 (#01000922)	Sleeping Giant Ranch, 20 miles (32 km) north of Helena; 46°49′30″N 111°57′44″W	Helena	
32	Home of Peace	Home of Peace	May 24, 2006 (#06000425)	Alexander St. between Brady St. and Custer Ave. 46°36′53″N 112°03′01″W	Helena	
33	House of the Good Shepherd Historic District	House of the Good Shepherd Historic District	December 23, 1993 (#93001448)	Area surrounding the junction of 9th Ave. and N. Hoback St. 46°35′15″N 112°01′30″W	Helena	
34	John H. Huseby House	John H. Huseby House	December 26, 2012 (#12001086)	511 E. 6th Ave. 46°35′11″N 112°01′54″W	Helena	
35	Herman Kemna House	Herman Kemna House	August 18, 1992 (#92001056)	635 1st St. 46°34′47″N 112°01′48″W	Helena	
36	T. H. Kleinschmidt House	T. H. Kleinschmidt House	August 6, 1980 (#80004272)	1823 Highland Ave. 46°34′58″N 112°00′25″W	Helena	
37	Kluge House	Kluge House	April 28, 1970 (#70000358)	540 W. Main St. 46°35′22″N 111°55′47″W	Helena	
38	Lewis and Clark County Hospital Historic District	Lewis and Clark County Hospital Historic District	November 19, 2002 (#02001101)	3404 Cooney Dr.; also North Benton Avenue between Chert Place and Flagstone Avenue; 46°37′20″N 112°02′12″W	Helena	Second set of addresses represent a boundary increase approved July 1, 2024.
39	Lincoln Community Hall	Lincoln Community Hall	January 22, 1987 (#86003674)	Montana Highway 200; 46°57′20″N 112°41′11″W	Lincoln	
40	Lincoln Lodge	Lincoln Lodge	October 23, 1986 (#86002931)	Stemple Pass Rd. 46°57′23″N 112°40′50″W	Lincoln	
41	Lyman-Neel Residence	Lyman-Neel Residence	March 29, 2019 (#100003590)	309 N. Rodney St. 46°35′15″N 112°02′00″W	Helena	
42	F.M. Mack General Store		April 12, 2021 (#100006367)	210 Main St. 47°29′32″N 112°23′33″W	Augusta	
43	Mann Gulch Wildfire Historic District	Mann Gulch Wildfire Historic District	May 19, 1999 (#99000596)	Mann Gulch, a tributary of the Missouri River; 46°53′09″N 111°53′58″W	Helena	
44	Methodist-Episcopal Church of Marysville	Methodist-Episcopal Church of Marysville	January 5, 1984 (#84002489)	3rd St. 46°45′01″N 112°18′00″W	Marysville	
45	Missouri River Bridge	Missouri River Bridge	January 4, 2010 (#09001181)	Milepost 11 on Old U.S. Route 91; 47°01′08″N 112°00′44″W	Wolf Creek	part of the Montana's Historic Steel Truss Bridges MPS
46	Montana Aeronautics Commission Operations Historic District	Montana Aeronautics Commission Operations Historic District	July 31, 2017 (#100001392)	2630 Airport Rd. 46°36′09″N 111°59′35″W	Helena	Original 1958 Structure and adjacent 1965 garage.
47	Montana State Arsenal, Armory and Drill Hall	Montana State Arsenal, Armory and Drill Hall	February 14, 2002 (#02000048)	1100 N. Main; 46°35′54″N 112°01′55″W	Helena	
48	Montana State Capitol Building	Montana State Capitol Building	February 17, 1981 (#81000660)	Central Ave. and Main St. 46°35′09″N 112°01′12″W	Helena	
49	Montana State Capitol Campus Historic District	Montana State Capitol Campus Historic District	February 23, 2016 (#16000033)	Bounded by E. Broadway & N. Carson Sts., E. 8th & N. Montana Aves. 46°35′06″N 112°01′07″W	Helena	
50	Montana State Fairgrounds Racetrack	Montana State Fairgrounds Racetrack	December 20, 2006 (#06001136)	98 W. Custer Ave. 46°37′17″N 112°03′22″W	Helena	
51	Montana Veterans and Pioneers Memorial Building	Montana Veterans and Pioneers Memorial Building	December 15, 2004 (#04001357)	225 N. Roberts; 46°35′11″N 112°00′55″W	Helena	
52	Morelli Bridge	Morelli Bridge	December 8, 2022 (#100008436)	Head of Reeder's Alley on Howie St. 46°35′08″N 112°02′41″W	Helena	
53	Mount Helena Historic District	Mount Helena Historic District	January 9, 1997 (#96001568)	Promontory roughly bounded by LeGrande Canon Boulevard, Last Chance and Grizzly Gulches, and the Helena National Forest boundary 46°35′15″N 112°03′28″W	Helena	
54	John T. Murphy House	John T. Murphy House	August 1, 1984 (#84002495)	418 N. Benton Ave. 46°35′28″N 112°02′25″W	Helena	
55	Olsen House	Olsen House	March 22, 1991 (#91000333)	516 N. Park; 46°35′33″N 112°02′23″W	Helena	
56	Francis and Hannah Pope House	Francis and Hannah Pope House	June 27, 2007 (#07000591)	327 N. Rodney; 46°35′16″N 112°01′55″W	Helena	
57	Porter Flats Apartments	Porter Flats Apartments	January 14, 1993 (#92001761)	335 N. Ewing St. 46°35′15″N 112°02′02″W	Helena	
58	C.B. Power Bungalow		April 7, 1995 (#95000380)	1.2 miles (1.9 km) north of Interstate 15 and 1 mile (1.6 km) west of U.S. Route 287; 47°02′46″N 112°04′04″W	Wolf Creek	A "masterful example of Craftsman/Bungalow style architecture at its best", designed by architect Robert C. Reamer.
59	Quinn's Garage		March 27, 2020 (#100005163)	206 Main St. 47°29′33″N 112°23′32″W	Augusta	
60	Thomas P. Regan Cabin		January 8, 2003 (#02001686)	McDonald Pass; 46°34′43″N 112°17′28″W	Helena	
61	Shaw's Best Factory	Shaw's Best Factory	June 25, 2021 (#100006699)	426½ Harrison Ave. 46°35′29″N 112°02′46″W	Helena	
62	Sheep Creek Bridge		April 28, 2011 (#11000225)	Milepost 5 on Recreation Rd. 46°58′39″N 112°04′53″W	Wolf Creek vicinity	Reinforced Concrete Bridges in Montana, 1900-1958 MPS
63	Silver City Cemetery (Lewis and Clark County, Montana)	Silver City Cemetery (Lewis and Clark County, Montana)	April 26, 2020 (#100005209)	Birdseye Road at Ruttebegga Road; 46°44′09″N 112°10′52″W	Silver City vicinity	
64	Silver Creek School		August 11, 1980 (#80004273)	North of Helena on Sierra Rd. 46°39′37″N 112°00′27″W	Helena	
65	Silver King Ranch	Silver King Ranch	March 10, 1992 (#92000114)	Roughly 15 miles (24 km) northeast of Lincoln in the Helena National Forest; 47°04′26″N 112°33′30″W	Lincoln	
66	Morris Silverman House	Morris Silverman House	June 14, 1982 (#82004636)	412 N. Rodney St. 46°35′20″N 112°01′52″W	Helena	
67	Spalding-Gunn House	Spalding-Gunn House	December 27, 2006 (#06001187)	433 Clarke St. 46°35′29″N 112°02′41″W	Helena	
68	Stearns Hall	Stearns Hall	April 7, 1995 (#95000382)	2 miles (3.2 km) north of the junction of Montana Highways 200 and 434; 47°12′27″N 112°16′33″W	Wolf Creek	
69	Stedman Foundry and Machine Company	Stedman Foundry and Machine Company	April 4, 1996 (#96000370)	2650 Euclid Ave. 46°36′32″N 112°04′30″W	Helena	
70	Summit Lodge		May 17, 1990 (#90000723)	30 miles (48 km) northwest of Helena in the Helena National Forest; 46°47′50″N 112°27′11″W	Helena	
71	Temple Emanu-El	Temple Emanu-El	July 11, 2002 (#02000724)	515 N. Ewing St. 46°35′24″N 112°01′54″W	Helena	
72	Unemployment Compensation Commission Building	Unemployment Compensation Commission Building	May 18, 2012 (#12000285)	1315 -1327 Lockey Ave. 46°35′06″N 112°01′11″W	Helena	Now Department of Labor and Industry, Walt Sullivan Building
73	Wassweiler Hotel and Bath Houses	Wassweiler Hotel and Bath Houses	August 1, 1978 (#78001688)	West of Helena on U.S. Route 12; 46°35′51″N 112°06′18″W	Helena	
74	Western Clay Manufacturing Company		May 9, 1985 (#85001052)	2915 Country Club Rd. 46°36′53″N 112°04′53″W	Helena	Now the Archie Bray Foundation for the Ceramic Arts.
75	Western Life Insurance Company Helena Branch Office	Western Life Insurance Company Helena Branch Office	September 10, 2012 (#12000784)	600 N. Park Ave. 46°35′38″N 112°02′27″W	Helena	
76	Wetzstein/Tipton Ranch		March 17, 2025 (#100011547)	1968 Rimini Road; 46°32′41″N 112°14′46″W	Rimini vicinity	
77	Wick-Seiler House	Wick-Seiler House	August 2, 2000 (#00000873)	729 11th Ave. 46°35′22″N 112°01′38″W	Helena	
78	Williams Street Bridge		November 29, 2006 (#06001094)	Williams St. crossing Ten Mile Creek, north of the junction of Williams St. and Broadwater Ave. 46°36′19″N 112°05′14″W	Helena	Replaced in 2010
79	Wolf Creek Hotel	Wolf Creek Hotel	November 7, 1997 (#97001381)	Junction of Main St. and Bissonmett St. 47°00′23″N 112°04′09″W	Wolf Creek	
80	Young Women's Christian Association (Independent)	Young Women's Christian Association (Independent)	December 27, 1984 (#84000569)	501 N. Park St. 46°35′49″N 112°02′35″W	Helena	

== See also ==
- List of National Historic Landmarks in Montana
- National Register of Historic Places listings in Montana
