= Fisk House =

Fisk House may refer to:

- Willard-Fisk House, Holden, Massachusetts, listed on the National Register of Historic Places (NRHP) in Worcester County
- Abram C. Fisk House, Coldwater, Michigan, NRHP-listed in Branch County
- Woodbury Fisk House, Minneapolis, Minnesota, NRHP-listed
- Neibert-Fisk House, Natchez, Mississippi, NRHP-listed in Adams County
- Joel S. Fisk House, Green Bay, Wisconsin, NRHP-listed in Brown County
- Robert and Elizabeth Fisk House, Helena, Montana NRHP-listed in Lewis and Clark County
- Luke Jillson House, Cumberland, Rhode Island, also known as the Fisk House, NRHP-listed in Providence County
- Campbell Taylor and Greenleaf Fisk House, Bastrop, Texas, NRHP-listed in Bastrop County
- Greenleaf Fisk House, Brownwood, Texas, NRHP-listed in Brown County
