= T. H. Kleinschmidt House =

Historic house in Montana, United States

- U.S. National Register of Historic Places
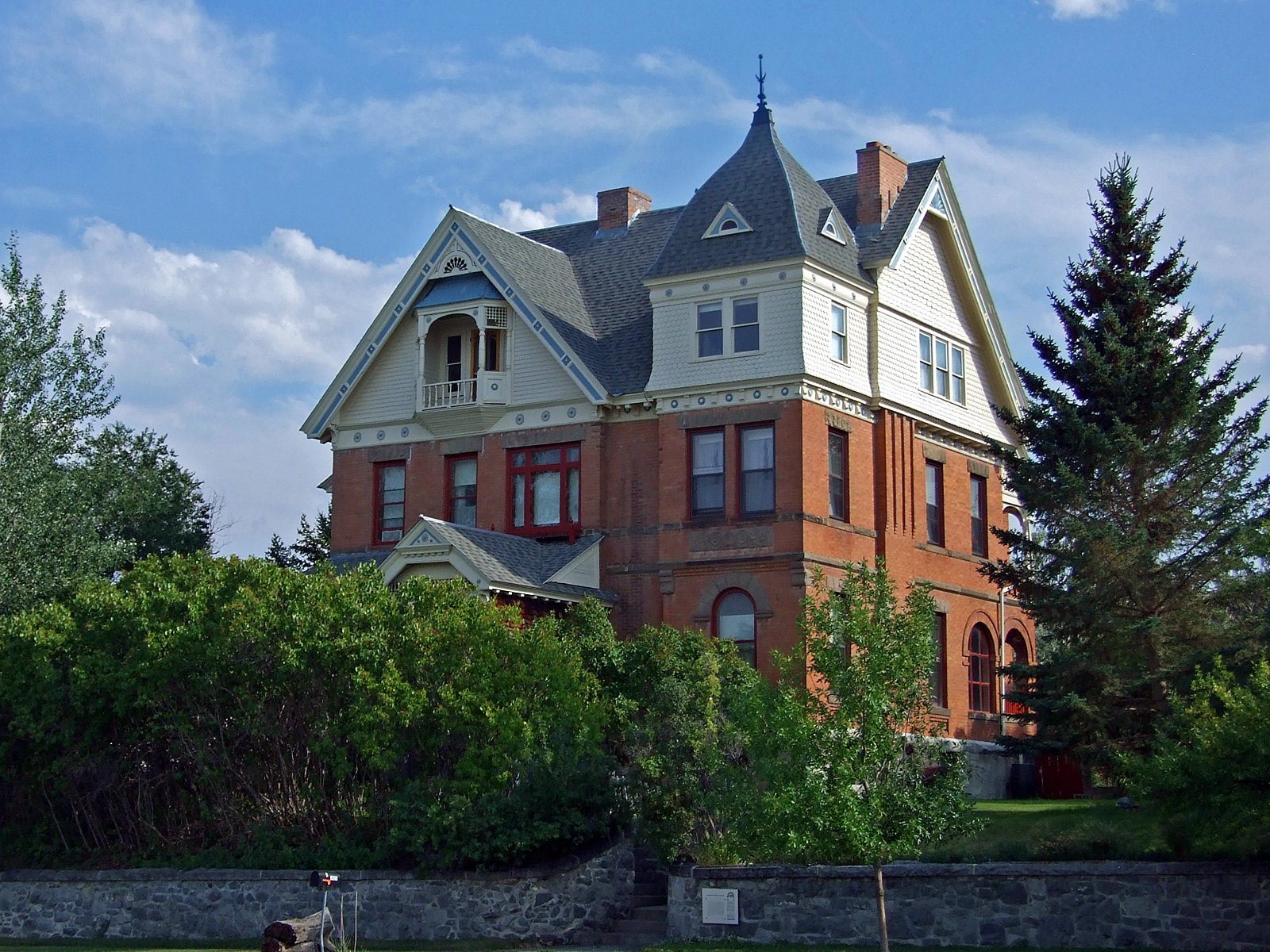
- The T. H. Kleinschmidt House in 2012

- Location within Montana Location within the United States
- Location: 1823 Highland Avenue, Helena, Montana
- Coordinates: 46°34′58″N 112°0′25″W
- Area: less than one acre
- Built: 1892
- Architect: Norris, W.E.
- Architectural style: Queen Anne
- NRHP reference No.: 80004272
- Added to NRHP: August 6, 1980

T. H. Kleinschmidt House is a historic house in Helena, Montana. It was built in 1892 for T. H. Kleinschmidt, his wife and their six children. Kleinschmidt was a Prussian-born immigrant who invested in placer mining and later co-founded the First National Bank of Helena with Governor Samuel Thomas Hauser (who lived at the Hauser Mansion). It was designed in the Victorian architectural style by W. E. Norris. It has been listed on the National Register of Historic Places since August 6, 1980.
