= Morris Silverman House =

Historic house in Montana, United States

- U.S. National Register of Historic Places
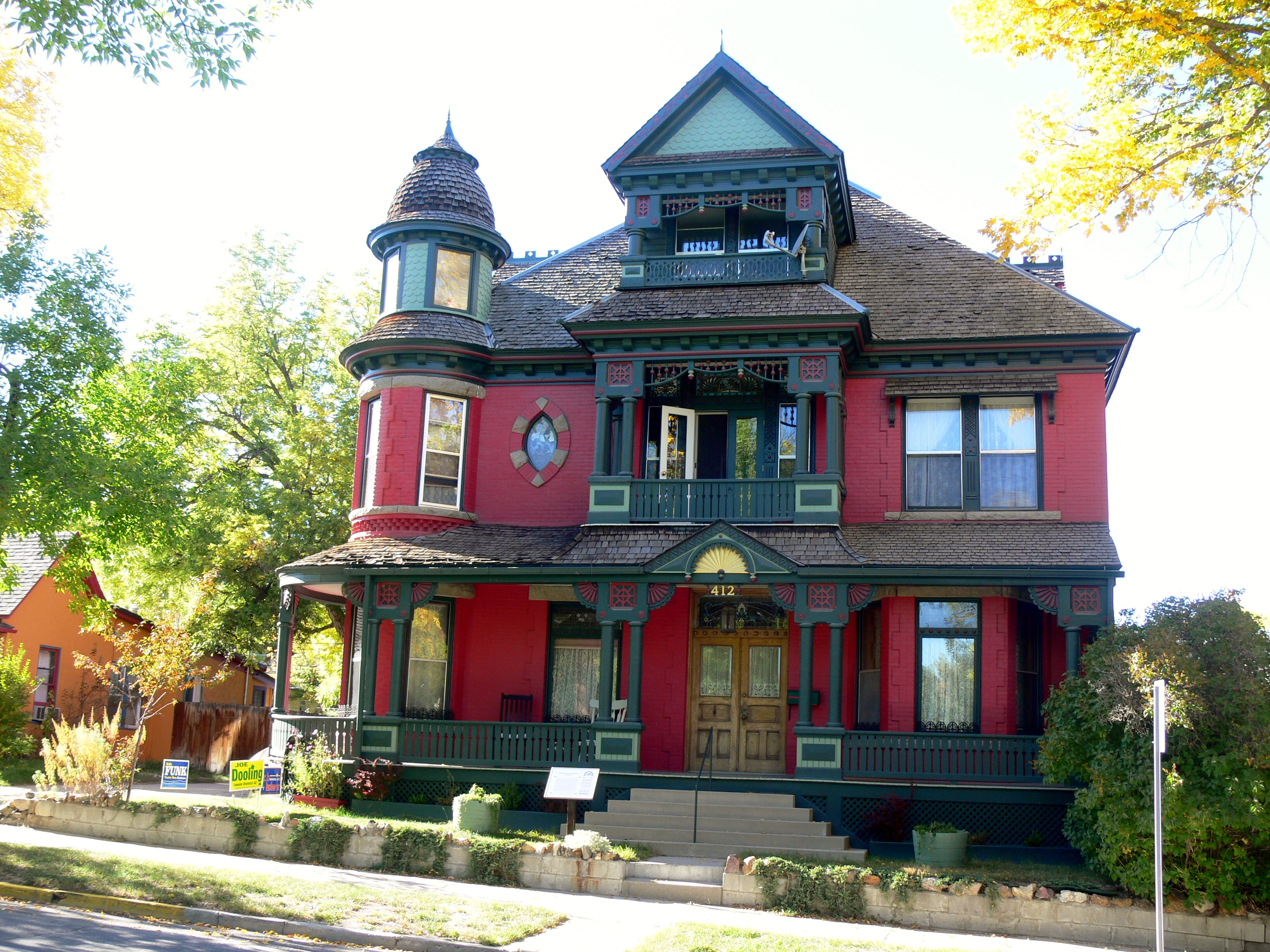

- Location within Montana Location within the United States
- Location: 412 N. Rodney St., Helena, Montana
- Coordinates: 46°35′20″N 112°1′52″W
- Area: less than one acre
- Built: 1890
- NRHP reference No.: 82004636
- Added to NRHP: June 14, 1982

The Morris Silverman House is a historic house in Helena, Montana, U.S.. It was built in 1890 for Morris Silverman, a Russian Jewish immigrant. His daughter Dorothy, a schoolteacher, lived in the house until 1969. It has been listed on the National Register of Historic Places since June 14, 1982.
