= Young Women's Christian Association (Independent) =

- U.S. National Register of Historic Places
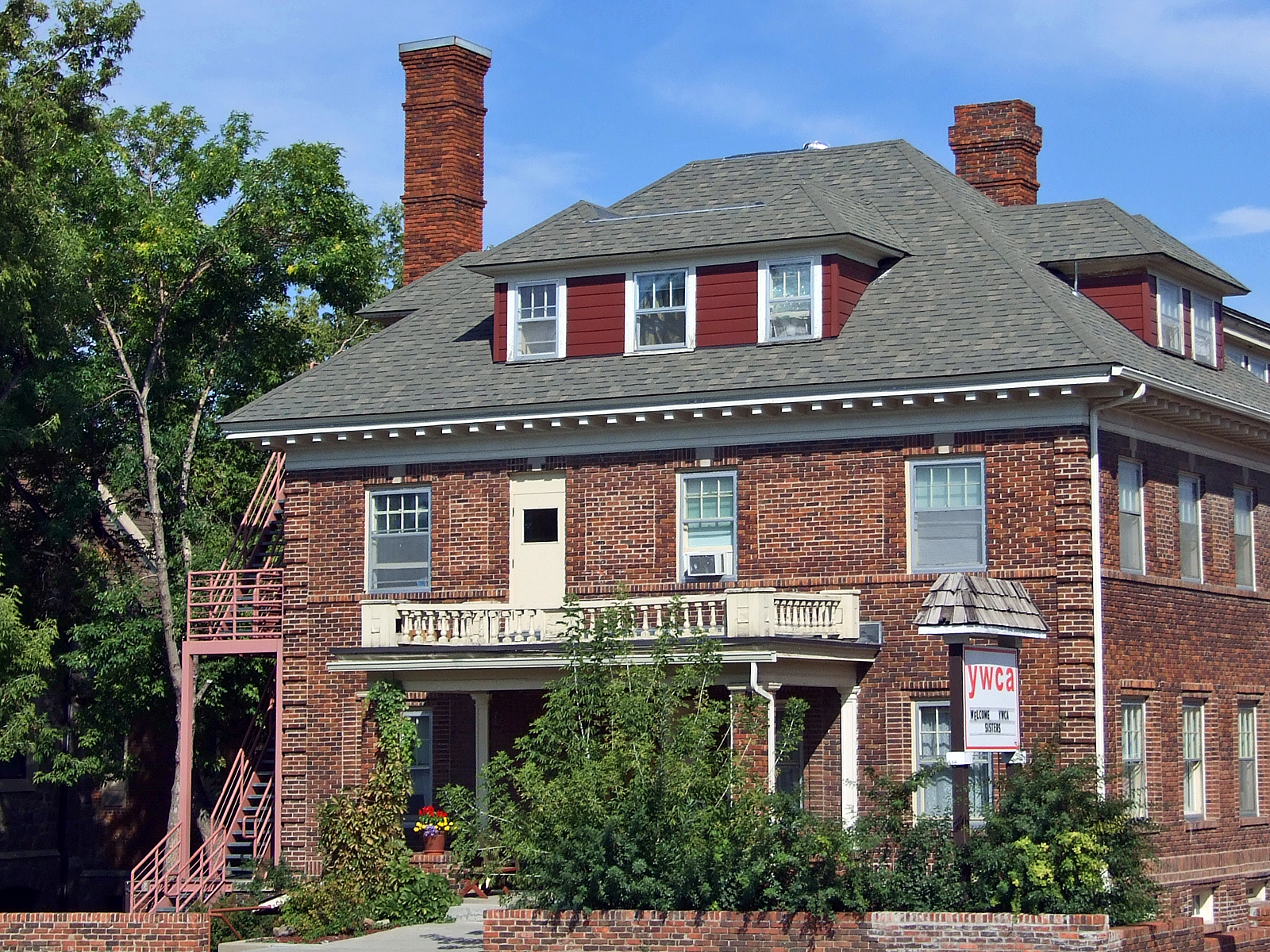
- The Young Women's Christian Association building in 2012

- Location within Montana Location within the United States
- Location: 501 North Park Street, Helena, Montana
- Coordinates: 46°35′49″N 112°2′35″W
- Area: less than one acre
- Built: 1918
- Architectural style: Bungalow/craftsman
- NRHP reference No.: 84000569
- Added to NRHP: December 27, 1984

The Young Women's Christian Association is a historic building in Helena, Montana, U.S.. It was built for the local YWCA chapter in 1918, and designed by architect Chester H. Kirk. It has been listed on the National Register of Historic Places since December 27, 1984.

== See also ==
- List of YWCA buildings
- National Register of Historic Places listings in Lewis and Clark County, Montana
