= Christmas Gift Evans House =

Historic house in Montana, United States

- U.S. National Register of Historic Places
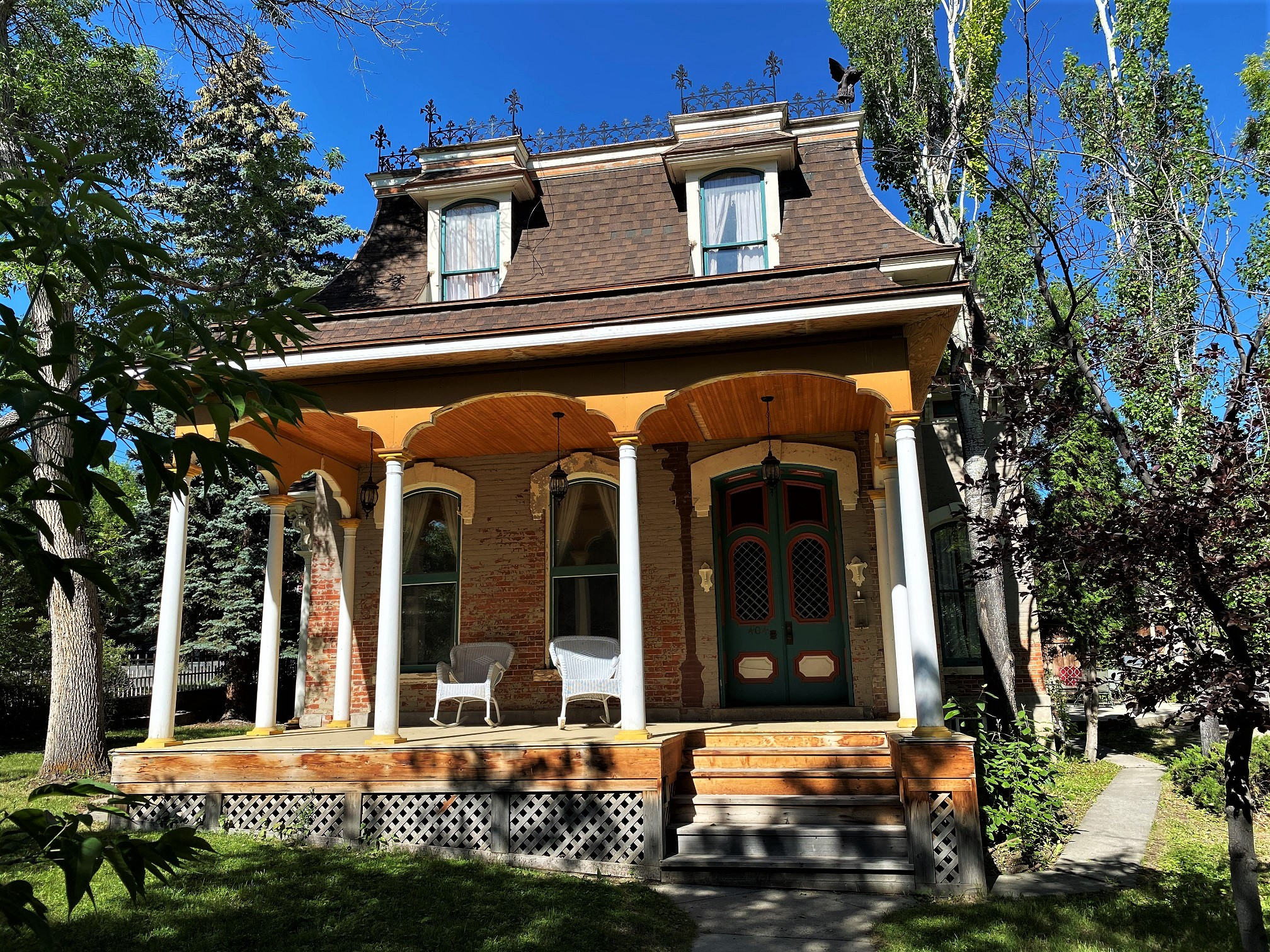

- Location within Montana Location within the United States
- Location: 404 N. Benton Ave. Helena, Montana
- Coordinates: 46°35′27″N 112°02′27″W
- Area: 0.3 acres (0.12 ha)
- Built: 1877
- Architect: John B. Sanford
- Architectural style: Queen Anne; Second Empire
- NRHP reference No.: 80004271
- Added to NRHP: April 16, 1980

The Christmas Gift Evans House, also known as "Myhre House", is a house built in the Queen Anne and Second Empire styles in 1877 in Helena, Montana, United States, that was added to the National Register of Historic Places in 1980.

Named for his birth date, Christmas Gift Evans was born in 1840, in Deerfield in Oneida County, New York. He was known as "Chris". In 1862 he made his first trip west, via Panama to San Francisco, but he returned home after only a year of placer mining. He made his second trip west in April 1864 and settled in Helena in 1865. Along the way he met John B. Sanford, born to a Quaker family in Maine. The two become lifelong friends and business partners. They started out by mining along Ten Mile Creek and Nelson Gulch, then became involved in business activities including lumber, hay, grist mills, flour mills, coal, feed, farm implements, sawmills, and real estate under the business name Sanford and Evans. Their Helena office was on the corner of Fuller and Lawrence Streets. After they died the firm became Sanford-Evans Inc. Sanford built the house for his wife, Eva in 1877. About 1883, Sanford moved and Evans bought the house.

A plaque beside the building stated "The home is a grand expression of the flamboyant Second Empire style whose brief popularity during the 1870s coincided with the construction of Helena’s first substantial residences. The bell-cast mansard roof, decorative bracketing and exquisite ornamental iron cresting are noteworthy features of this beautiful, exceptionally well-preserved home." In 2010, the historical marker and post, valued at about $1,000, were stolen from the house, the first such occurrence in Helena.

Evans married Margaret Graham in 1880; she died in 1894. Evans married Bertha Bellis, of Liverpool, England, on May 23, 1896. Bertha Evans became involved in many of her husband's business activities after he died. Chris and Bertha Evans died in 1915 and 1940, respectively.

== See also ==
- National Register of Historic Places listings in Lewis and Clark County, Montana
