= Benton Avenue Cemetery =

Historic cemetery in Lewis and Clark County, Montana, US

- U.S. National Register of Historic Places
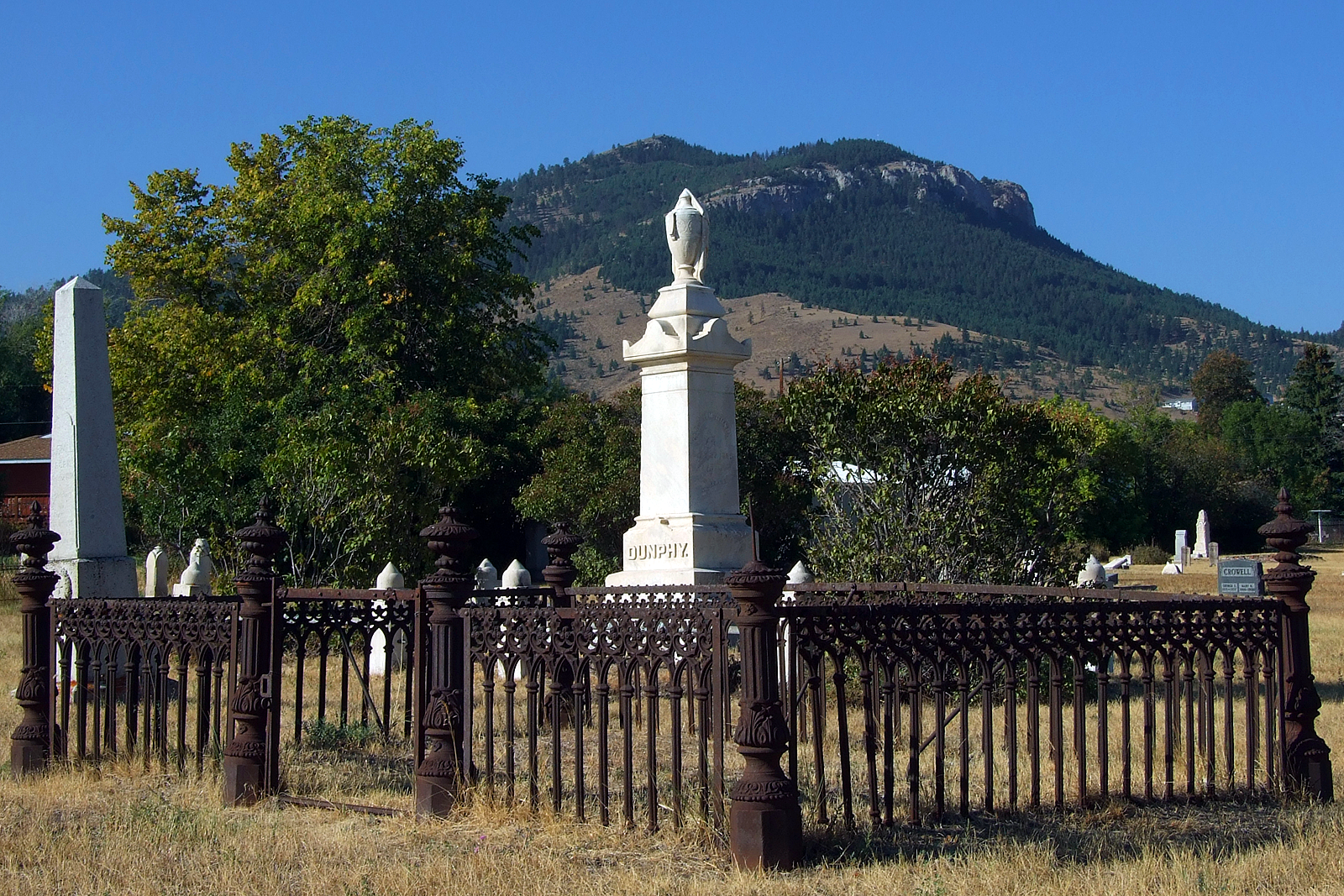
- Benton Avenue Cemetery

- Location within Montana Location within the United States
- Nearest city: Helena, Montana
- Coordinates: 46°36′18″N 112°02′33″W
- Area: 10 acres (4.0 ha)
- Built: 1870
- NRHP reference No.: 03000689
- Added to NRHP: July 24, 2003

The Benton Avenue Cemetery located in Helena, Montana was established by the Lewis and Clark County commissioners in 1870, and run by the county until management was turned over to the Benton Avenue Cemetery Association in 1922. The City Cemetery was older than Benton, but that property had to be cleared in 1875 for construction of Central School, those graves reinterred at Benton. In 1883, the route of Helena's first Memorial Day parade ended with a ceremony at Benton Avenue Cemetery.

The cemetery was re-dedicated in 1968 following an extensive clean-up and restoration. In 1974, the cemetery was added to Montana's historic sites by the Governor's Commission on Historic Preservation, and was added to the National Register of Historic Places in 2003. At the time of the NRHP listing, there were an estimated 896 burials in the cemetery's 10 acres (4.0 ha). In keeping with historic preservation, the grounds are maintained in keeping with the original 19th century plant life that grew in the area. A wrought iron fence, with two unlocked pedestrian gates, and one locked automobile gate, surrounds the grounds. Within the cemetery, there are also fenced-off areas privately maintained by family members.
