= Home of Peace Cemetery (Helena, Montana) =

Jewish cemetery in Lewis and Clark County, Montana

- Home of Peace
- U.S. National Register of Historic Places
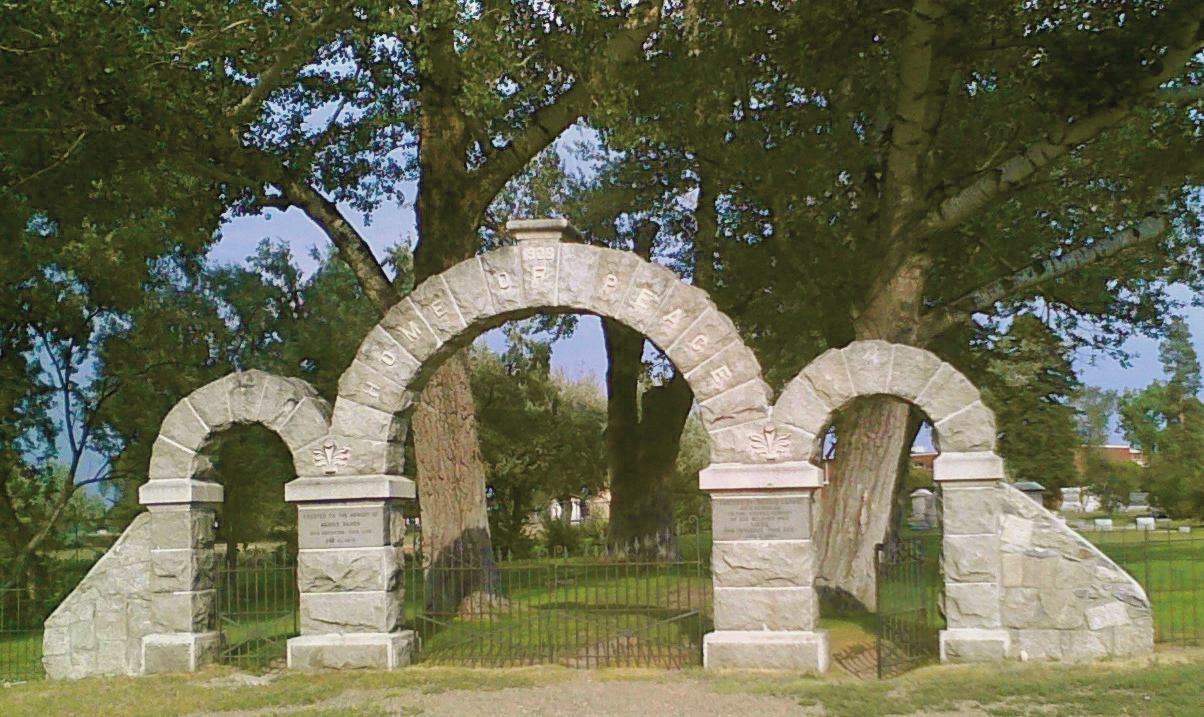
- Gateway to Home of Peace Cemetery

- Location within Montana Location within the United States
- Location: Alexander St. between Brady St. and Custer Ave., Helena, Montana
- Coordinates: 46°36′53″N 112°03′01″W
- Area: 5 acres
- Built: 1867
- NRHP reference No.: 06000425
- Added to NRHP: May 24, 2006

Home of Peace is a Jewish cemetery in Helena, Montana, founded in 1867 by the local Hebrew Benevolent Society (also referred to as the Hebrew Benevolent Association), which formed on December 9, 1866. The Society formally purchased the land in 1875. The Home of Peace Cemetery Association now maintains the grounds. It is the oldest active cemetery in Helena and the oldest active European ethno-religious cemetery in Montana. There are three major sections of land owned by the Association: the cemetery, undeveloped adjacent land, and land leased to the Helena School District since 1975. The portion leased by the school district is a practice football field for Capital High School and contains unmarked graves from the earliest days of the cemetery. The original wrought iron fence erected in 1867 still stands except on the north side and is in disrepair in places. A granite gateway erected in 1910 is at the main entrance. The east gate also has granite markers. There is a water tower, pump house, and landscaping shed. Twelve broken tombstones lie at the base of the water tower. The northwest corner has remained undeveloped and in its natural wild state. In 1910 cottonwood trees were planted along the driveway.

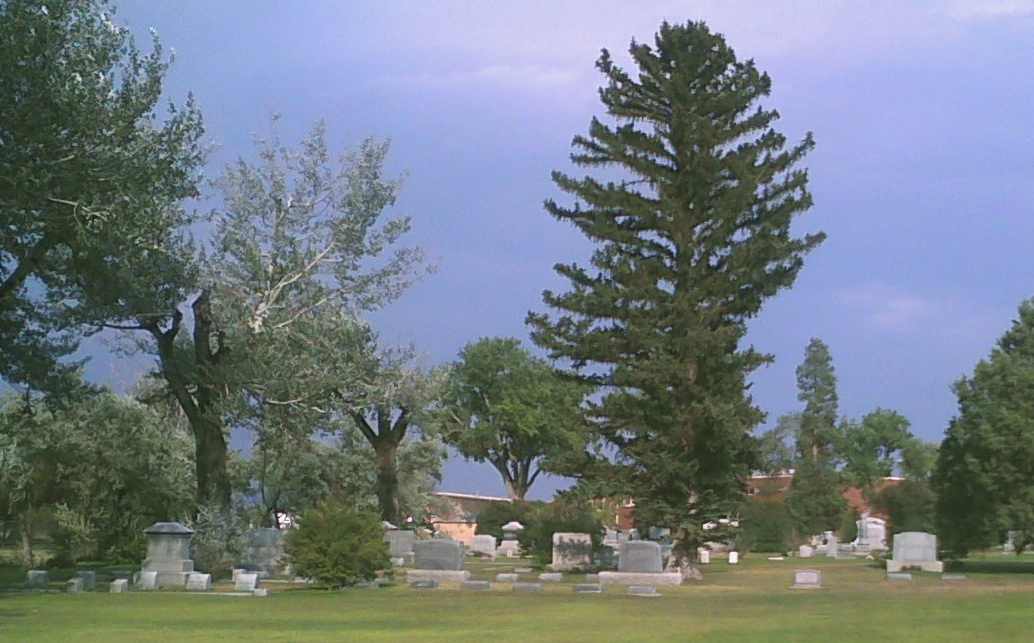
Home of Peace cemetery, Capital High School is the brick building visible in background

Jewish immigrants arrived in Helena as early as 1864. Most of the Jewish immigrants to Helena had come from Germany or Prussia in the wake of the Montana Gold Rush. Most of them practiced Reform Judaism and worked as merchants, providing goods and services to the miners. As of November 2005, there are 204 tombstones and over 240 recorded burials in the cemetery. There are no markers remaining from the 1860s. The oldest remaining marker is that of Hattie Jacobs who died in 1873. Most markers are made from local sandstone or granite, a few of imported marble. Markers are found both lying down and standing upright. As the Jewish population of Helena peaked in 1900 with 138 adults, burials in the cemetery are no longer as frequent as they once were. When the cemetery first opened in 1867 it was well outside the city limits at that time. The first Jew known to have died in Helena was Emanuel Blum, who died on May 5, 1865. He was buried in the City Cemetery because there was no Hebrew Cemetery at the time. Blum also became the first burial in the Home of Peace cemetery as the HBS voted on December 5, 1867 to have Blum's body moved there. In 1916, in response to a request to allow non-Jewish spouses and their unmarried children to be buried in the cemetery, the Board also approved non-Jewish burials even if there was no connection to someone who was Jewish. Several of the Jews buried in the cemetery were Freemasons. In many cases, the cemetery plots were arranged by family groups. The Jewish population of Helena declined steadily over the years and there are now more Jewish people buried in this cemetery than there are living in Helena.

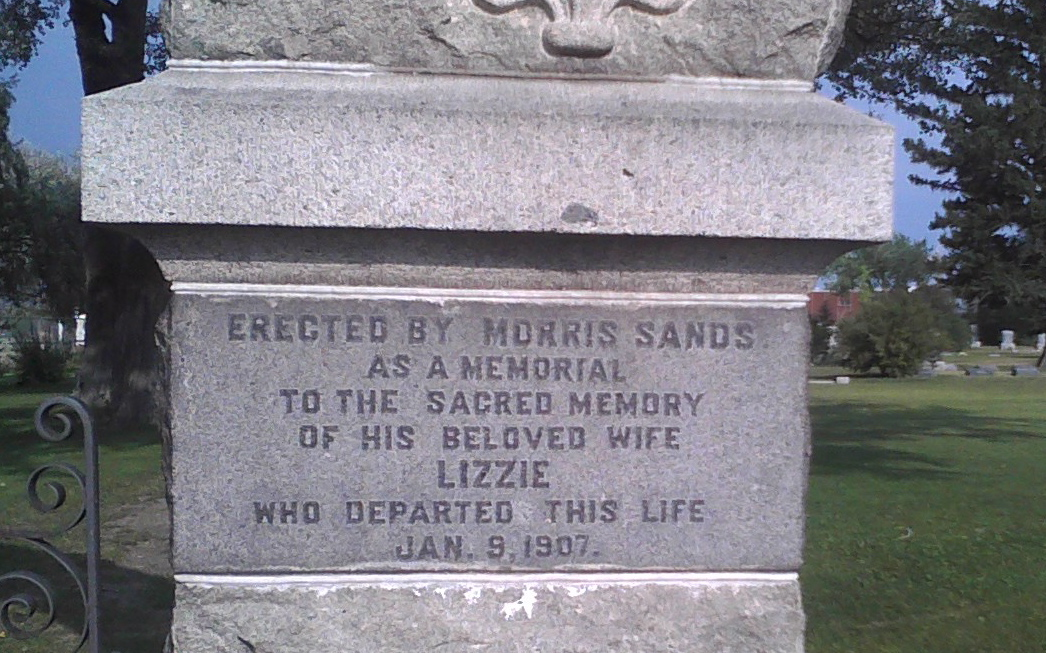
Memorial on gate to cemetery

== See also ==
- National Register of Historic Places listings in Lewis and Clark County, Montana
- Temple Emanu-El (Helena, Montana)
