= Temple Emanu-El (Helena, Montana) =

Historic former synagogue in Montana, US

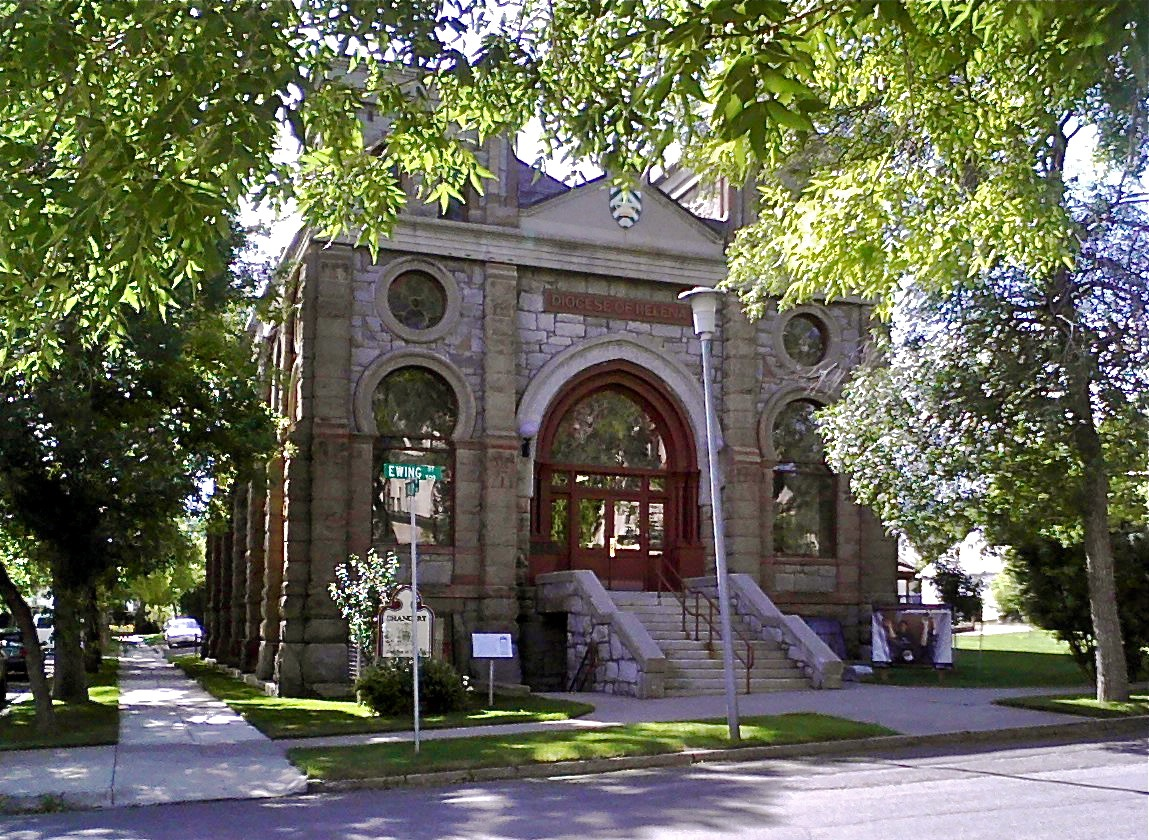
- The former synagogue, in 2012

- Location in Montana

Religion
- Affiliation: Judaism (former)
- Ecclesiastical or organizational status: Synagogue (1891 c. 1930s); State government offices (c. 1930s–1980); Catholic church offices (1981–2021); Jewish community services (since 2022)
- Ownership: Montana Jewish Project (since 2022)
- Status: Closed (as a synagogue); Repurposed (as offices)

Location
- Location: 515 North Ewing Street, Helena, Montana
- Country: United States
- Interactive map of Temple Emanu-El
- Coordinates: 46°35′24″N 112°1′54″W

Architecture
- Architects: Frederick Heinlein; Thomas F. Mathias
- Type: Synagogue architecture
- Style: Romanesque Revival; Moorish Revival
- Established: 1866 (as a congregation)
- Completed: 1891
- Temple Emanu-El
- U.S. National Register of Historic Places
- Area: less than one acre
- NRHP reference No.: 02000724
- Added to NRHP: July 11, 2002

Temple Emanu-El is a historic former Jewish congregation and synagogue, located in Helena, Montana, in the United States. Completed in 1891, the building was the first synagogue to be constructed between St. Paul, Minnesota, and Portland, Oregon.

The once-thriving Jewish community of Helena declined to the point that by the 1930s they could no longer maintain the building, and it was sold to the State of Montana, which added a second floor, converted it to office space and removed most religious symbolism from the building, though kept the unique stained glass windows.

Eventually, the building fell into disuse by the state other than storage space, and so it was purchased by the Catholic Diocese of Helena, then sold back to the Montana Jewish project which has owned it since 2022 for use as a center for Montana's Jewish community.

== Building history ==
Construction of the temple began in 1890, with the cornerstone laid by Montana governor Joseph K. Toole, and was completed in 1891. Architects Heinlein and Mathias used granite, porphyry and sandstone in the construction to create the building, which could hold as many as 500 people. It is built in Romanesque Revival style with keyhole windows and stained glass. The original building also featured a 30-foot (9.1 m) high ceiling in the sanctuary, and two large "onion"-style domes outside capping the towers placed on either side of the front entrance, making it an example of Moorish Revival architecture.

However, after the turn of the 20th century, the congregation fell upon hard economic times, and by the 1930s the Jewish population of Helena was too small to maintain the building. The leader of the remaining congregation, Norman Winestine, arranged to sell off the organ and pews to the Seventh-Day Adventists, and the State of Montana bought the temple for $1, promising to use the building for "a good and social purpose." The state remodeled the building in 1935–1936, adding a second floor over what had been the sanctuary, removed the onion domes, as well as most of the religious symbols on the exterior, some by sandblasting. The stained glass windows, however, were preserved. The state used the building to house the offices of the Department of Social and Rehabilitation Services.

The temple was not actively used from 1976 to 1980, serving as a storage space for the Montana Historical Society. Winestine, still living, feared it would be torn down. However, in 1981 the Catholic Diocese of Helena bought the former synagogue building for $81,000, and it served as the headquarters for the Diocese offices until 2021.

When the Diocese of Helena no longer needed the building, the Rev. Austin Vetter, bishop of the Helena Diocese made the decision to first offer the opportunity to buy the building and some surrounding property to the Jewish community. The asking price was $925,000 but with only $5,000 down. Vetter explained it was "common courtesy...This is what ecumenicism and dialogue should look like." The asking price was less than its appraised value, but the Montana Jewish Project, which organized the effort, had to raise $1.5 million by June 30, 2022. If Montana's Jewish community succeeds in repurchasing the building, the goal is to create a statewide Jewish cultural and community center.

The former synagogue building was placed on the National Register of Historic Places in 2000. In 2001, a plaque commemorating the synagogue was placed on the outside of the building, was well-maintained by the Catholic Diocese.

== History of Judaism in Helena ==
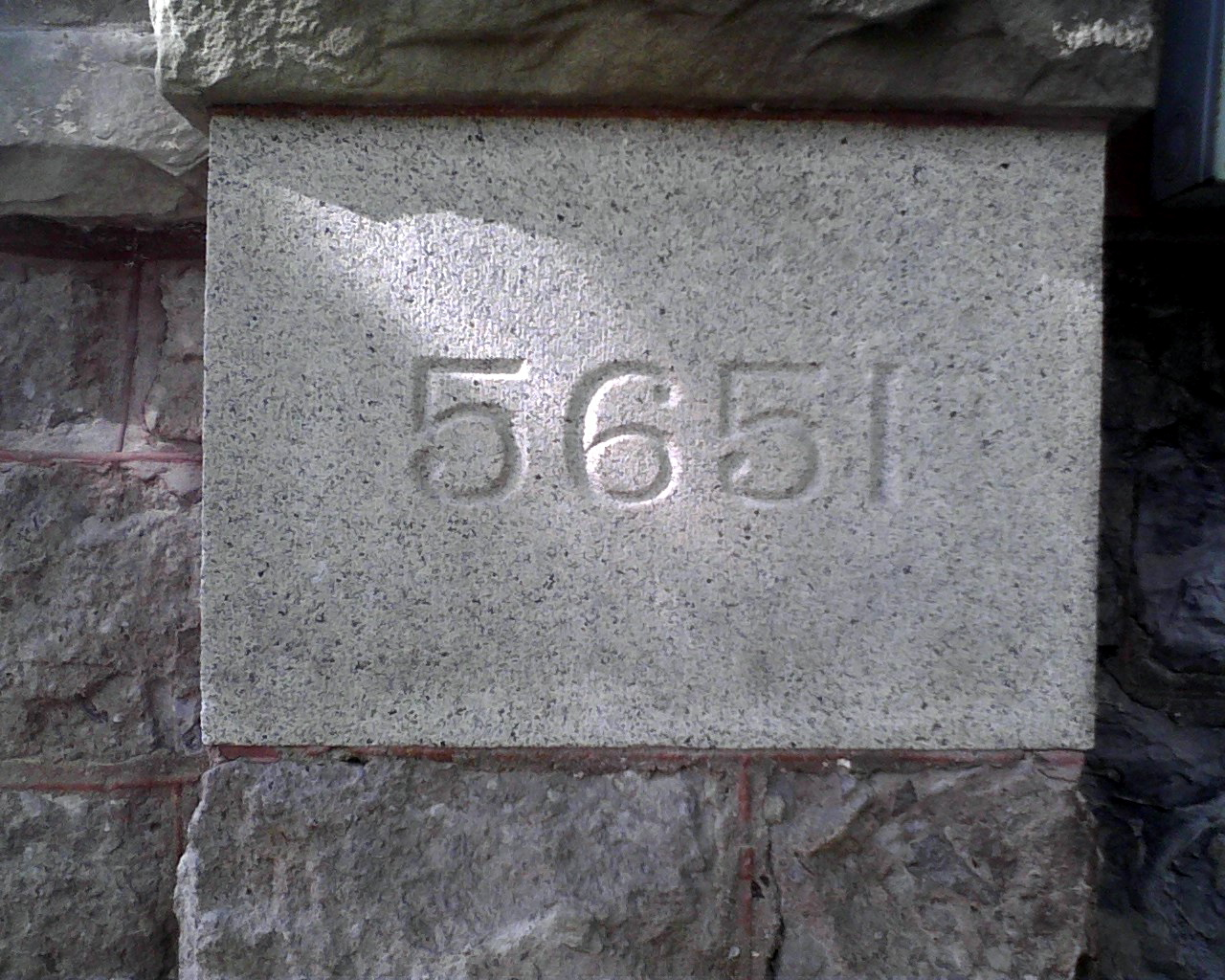
Cornerstone of the temple, inscribed with the Hebrew calendar year of its founding

During the Montana Gold Rush hundreds of Jewish people came to Montana, many of them to Helena. The early Jewish settlers to Helena were mostly of German origin, hailing from Prussia, Bavaria, and Austria, as well some from Poland. Forming a mutual aid organization called the United Hebrew Benevolent Society in 1866, they became a major economic force in the city, owning 17 of Helena's 20 dry goods stores by 1867. In 1871, merchant Jacob Feldberg was nicknamed "Helena's Paul Revere for his courage in organizing a bucket brigade that saved his entire neighborhood from a fire. In 1877, twenty percent of Helena's Board of Trade was Jewish, and the owner of the International Hotel, Marcus Lissner, served six terms on the Helena City Council. Lissner's hotel repeatedly burned during the many fires that plagued Helena's business district in the 1860s and 1870s, yet he rebuilt it each time until it was nicknamed "The Phoenix." Other members of Helena's Jewish community made significant contributions to the city, such as Josephine Israel, who not only supported the building of the temple, but also was the founder of Shodair Children's Hospital. On a purchasing trip to New York, Helena merchant Herman Gans convinced Rabbi Samuel Schulman to move to Helena. Rabbi Schulman was from Berlin and brought German Reform Judaism along. Rabbi Schulman and Gans were heavily involved in building Helena's temple.

The United Hebrew Benevolent Society also developed the Home of Peace Cemetery, which, due to the large numbers of Jewish people who left Helena (and much of Montana) during the Great Depression, now contains more bodies than the current living Jewish population of Helena. In nearby Butte, the Hebrew Benevolent Society of Butte followed, in 1881. The Butte Jewish community formed Congregation B'Nai Israel in 1897, completing their Temple 1903.

== Montana's Jewish community today ==
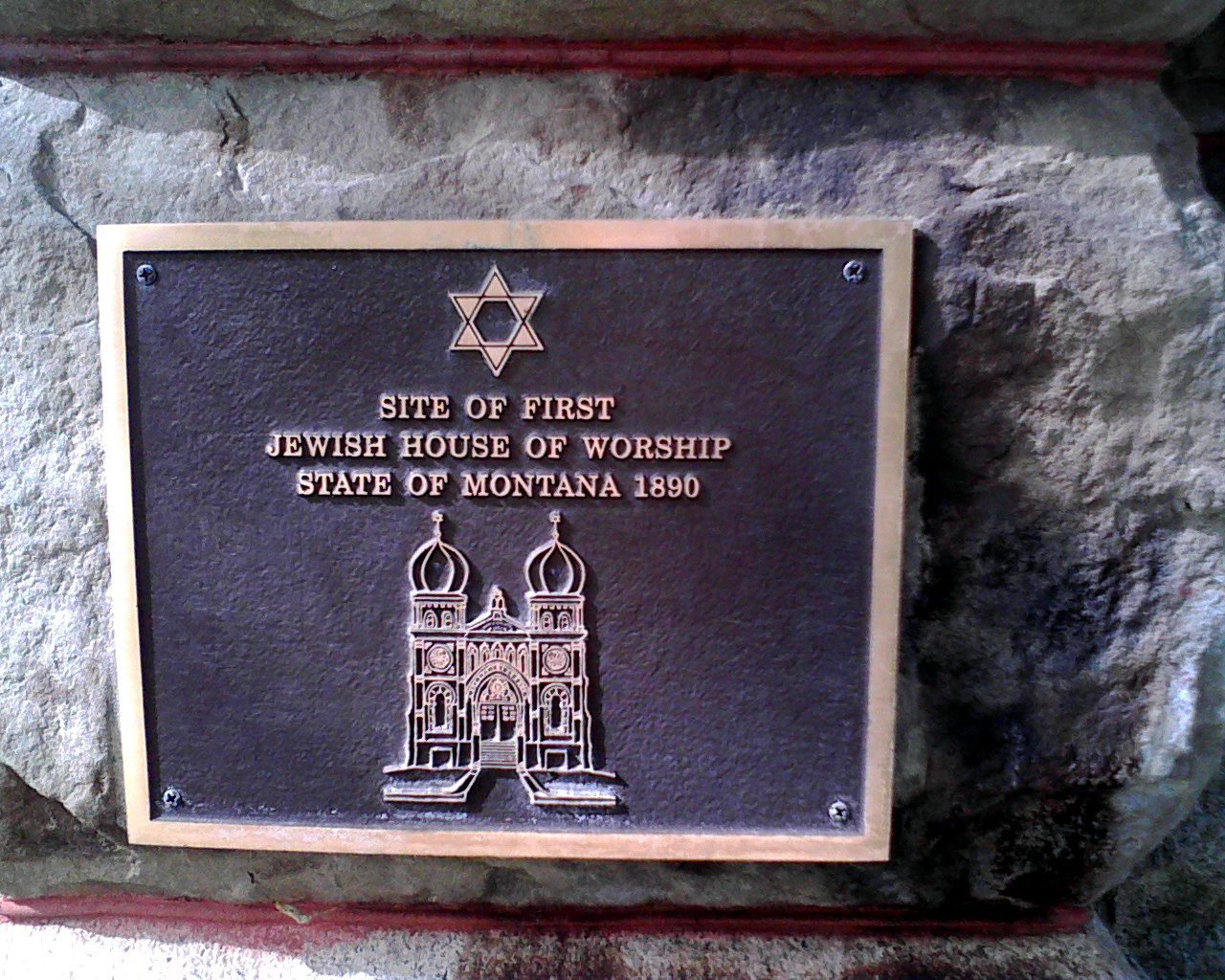
Commemorative marker, placed 2001 by the Jewish American Society for Historic Preservation, showing original building design with domes that were removed in the 1930s remodel of the building

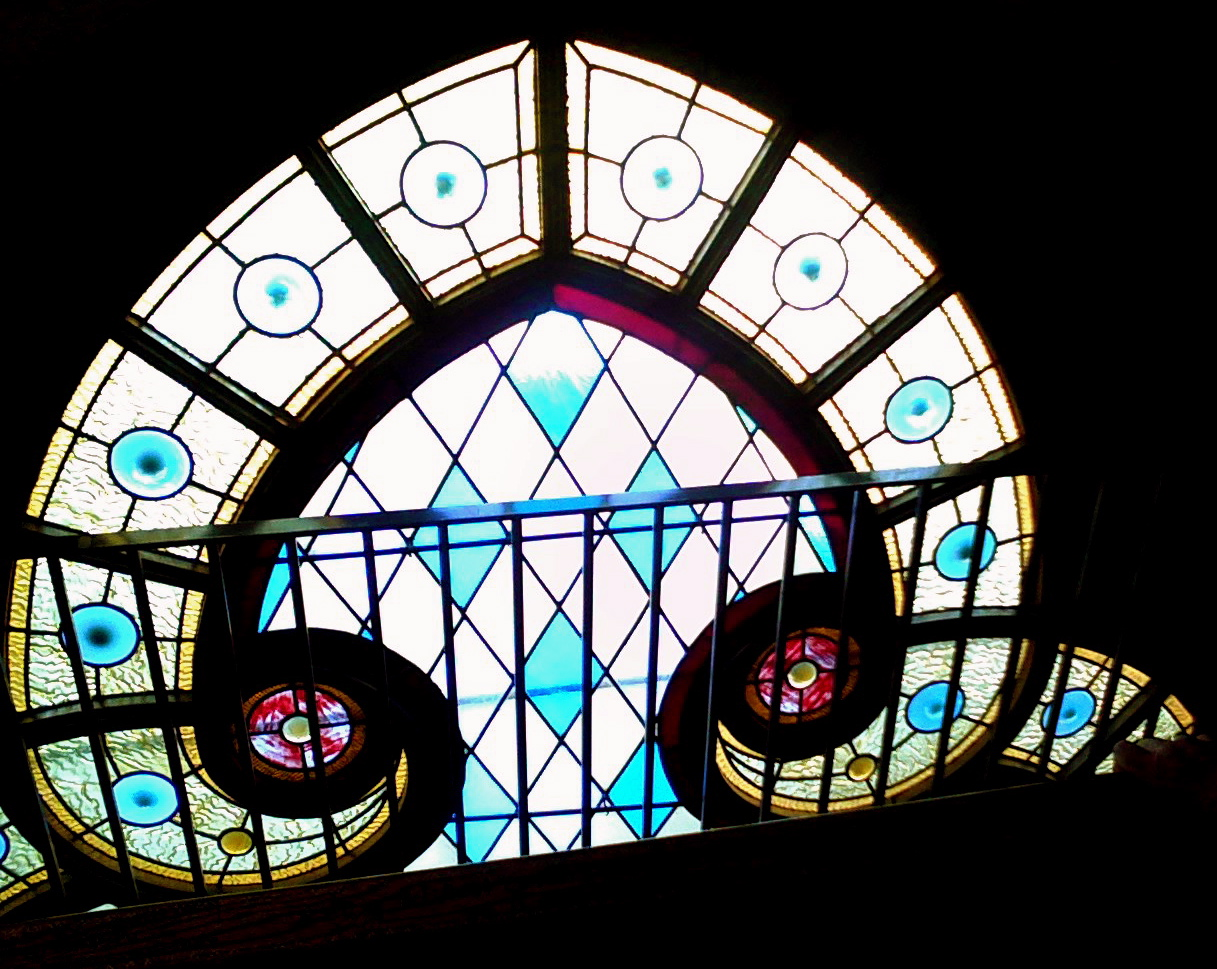
Stained glass windows of the Temple were preserved during the Depression-era remodeling of the building

Temple B'Nai Israel still holds services in Butte, but the Helena Jewish community does not have a Temple at present. In 2008, there were only about 1,000 self-identified Jews in Montana, a state with a population of about 900,000. The largest number are in Bozeman, where Rabbi Allen Secher was for a long time the only rabbi in the state. He retired in 2008. Other active Jewish communities, mostly Reform Judaism in affiliation, are found in Great Falls, Billings, the Flathead valley and Whitefish, Helena, Missoula, and Butte. They operate under the Montana Association of Jewish Communities, or "MAJCO". The Bozeman Jewish community includes amongst its membership Franke Wilmer, a state representative who was a Democratic primary election candidate for Congress in the 2012 election. In recent years, Chabad-Lubavitch has also opened up branches in the state, beginning with the 2006 arrival of Rabbi Chaim Bruk, in Bozeman and Rabbi Berry Nash in Missoula in 2014.

In 2008, local interest in Judaism was revived when the city of Helena bought a surplus bomb-sniffing dog for the price of a plane ticket from the Israel Defense Forces, who had gotten the puppy from an animal shelter in The Netherlands, but upon arrival, the Helena police department discovered the dog only responded to Hebrew commands and, though given a printed vocabulary list of commands, the officer in charge of the dog could not get "Miky" the German Shepherd to respond. When Rabbi Bruk came to the state capitol for a Hanukkah ceremony, the officer asked him some questions. Bruk taught the officer how to correctly pronounce Hebrew and then Miky began to respond.

In August 2022, the building was purchased by the Montana Jewish Project, returning the building to Jewish hands for the first time in 85 years.

== See also ==
- Helena Historic District (Montana)
- National Register of Historic Places listings in Lewis and Clark County, Montana
