= Silver King Ranch =

Historic house in Montana, United States

- U.S. National Register of Historic Places
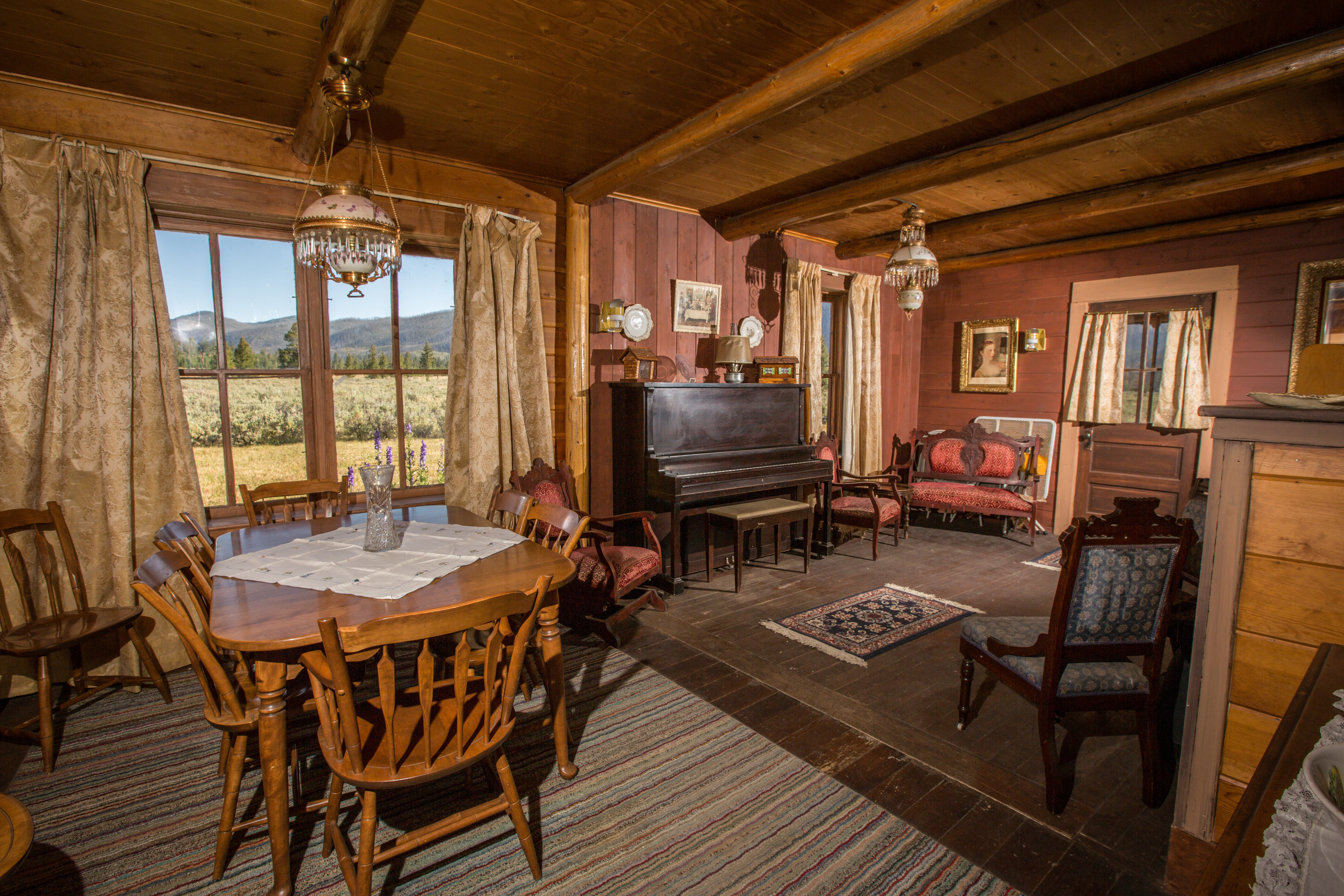
- Inside the house

- Location within Montana Location within the United States
- Nearest city: Lincoln, Montana
- Area: 120 acres (49 ha)
- Built: 1900
- Architectural style: Rustic
- NRHP reference No.: 92000114
- Added to NRHP: March 10, 1992

The Silver King Ranch is a historic ranch in Lewis and Clark County, Montana, U.S.. It includes meadows and two creeks: Landers Fork Creek and Indian Meadows Creek. There are also several buildings, including Owen Byrne Residence, a two-story log cabin whose construction was completed in 1914. It has been listed on the National Register of Historic Places since March 10, 1992.
