= Great Divide Montana =

Ski area in Montana, United States

Great Divide
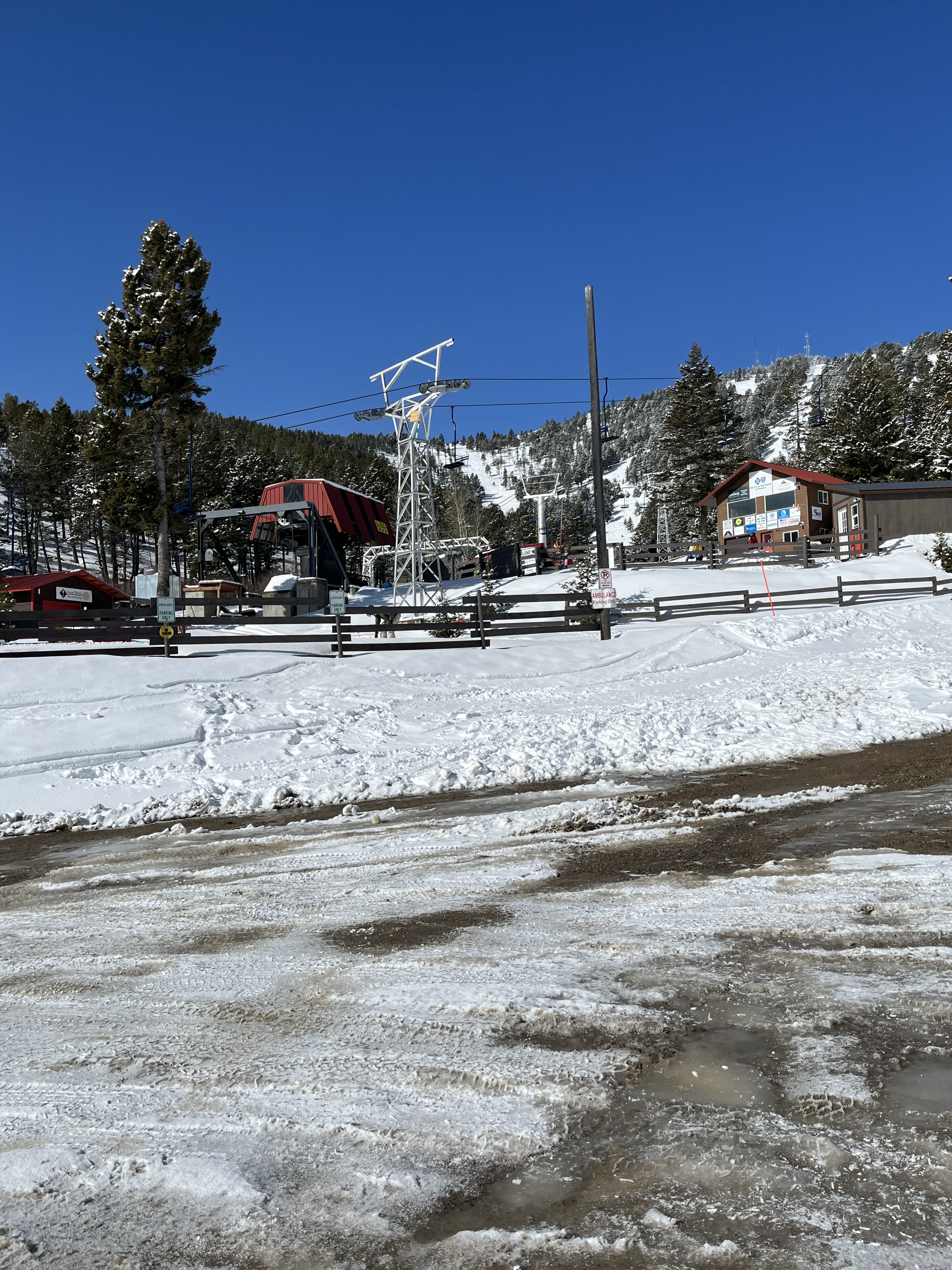
- Ski lift in the snow at great divide.

- Location within Montana Location within the United States
- Location: Marysville, Montana
- Nearest city: Helena, Montana
- Coordinates: 46.7497°N 112.3043°W
- Vertical: 1,500 ft (460 m)
- Top elevation: 7,233 ft (2,205 m)
- Base elevation: 5,730 ft (1,750 m)
- Trails: 140
- Longest run: 3 miles (4.8 km)
- Lift system: 5 Double, 1 Handle Tows
- Snowfall: 180 inches (460 cm)
- Website: Official webpage

Great Divide is an alpine ski area located northwest of Helena in the state of Montana. The ski area sits on Mount Belmont, a 7,300-foot peak near the Continental Divide. Great Divide is a locally owned ski area that is often the first ski area in Montana to open for the season each year.

== History ==
Mt. Belmont's first trail was built to accommodate the 1942 Northern Rocky Mountain Ski Races, and was selected amongst other surrounding mountains including Elkhorn Peak, Red Mountain, and Mt. Edith. The ski area was owned and operated by the non-profit Belmont Ski Club from 1941 thru much of 1985 when it was sold to the Taylor family who have developed the ski area and operated ever since. The first chair lift, Mt. Belmont chair, was built in 1986 and went to the top of the mountain. New chairlifts have been added to mid-mountain areas and a recent expansion of the area added the Rawhide and Wild West Chairlifts.

== Current operations ==
Great Divide is known for its terrain parks and hosts a variety of events featuring those parks. There is a snowmaking system which allows early openings and construction of all five terrain parks.

Great Divide starts at a base of 5,730 feet and offers more than 1600 acres of terrain. The mountain has five lifts and one rope tow that access over 140 trails covering 1,500 acres (6.1 km^{2}). There are paid and/or volunteer patrollers on duty at all times. The area is usually closed on Mondays and Tuesdays, and offers night skiing on Fridays 4 p.m. to 9 p.m. Great Divide offers lessons daily from 100 a.m. til 4 p.m., with instruction taking place in the Backyard Beginner's Area. There is an all-mountain ski team that is a 7-week program for kids aged 7 to 19, an average of 130 kids participate each season.

== Location ==
The ski area is located about 22 miles (35 km) west-northwest of Helena, Montana off Highway 279 (Lincoln Road), and then another seven miles (11 km) up Marysville Road near the small community of Marysville, Montana.
