= Samuel Schulman =

American rabbi

Samuel Schulman (14 February 1864 – 2 November 1955) was an American rabbi.

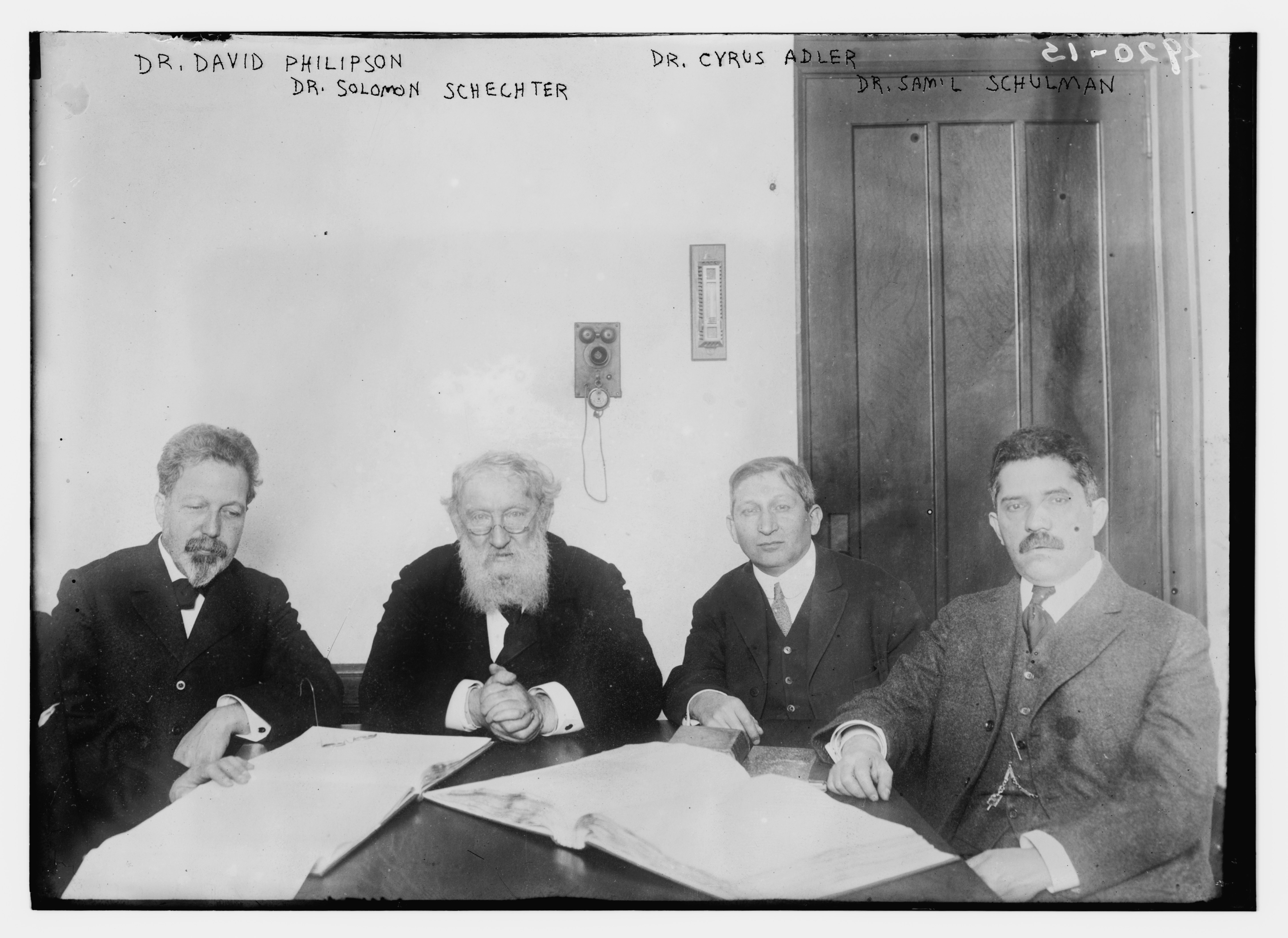
Dr. Samuel Schulman (right) with Drs. David Philipson, Solomon Schechter, and Cyrus Adler c. 1913

== Biography ==
Schulman was born in Russia; he came to the United States with his family in 1868, and attended the New York City public schools. He graduated from the College of the City of New York in 1885 and then went abroad where he studied at the University of Berlin and the Hochschule für die Wissenschaft des Judentums (Higher Institute for Jewish Studies) from 1885 to 1889. At the latter school, he completed the courses he needed to be ordained as a rabbi.

Returning to the United States, Schulman was rabbi in Helena, Montana, from 1890 to 1893, there instrumental in the building of Montana's first synagogue, Temple Emanu-El and at Kansas City, Missouri, from 1893 to 1899. He then returned to New York City 1899 where he joined Kaufman Kohler at Temple Beth-El, succeeding him in 1903. When Temple Beth-El was absorbed by Temple Emanu-El in 1927, he became rabbi of the new congregation, becoming rabbi emeritus in 1934.

On June 11, 1924, he offered the invocation at the opening of the second day of the 1924 Republican National Convention. He spoke with appreciation for "the Republican Party's precious heritage of the championship of human rights" and he called for "every form of prejudice and misunderstanding" to be "driven forever out of our land." Speaking of Calvin Coolidge, he praised "the integrity, the wisdom, the fearlessness of our beloved President." He died in New York City, aged 91.

== Literary activities ==
He was a member of the board of editors for the English translation of the Bible for the Synagogue, a contributor to the Jewish Encyclopedia. While he authored no large works, he wrote articles and his sermons were published as pamphlets frequently. Among the articles he wrote were:

- "Jewish Ethics"
- "Israel"
- "Why American Jews are opposed to Zionism"
- "The Fundamentals of Judaism as a Religion for the World"
- "The Significance of Israel and Judaism for a New World-order"
