= Kluge House =

Historic house in Montana, United States

- U.S. National Register of Historic Places
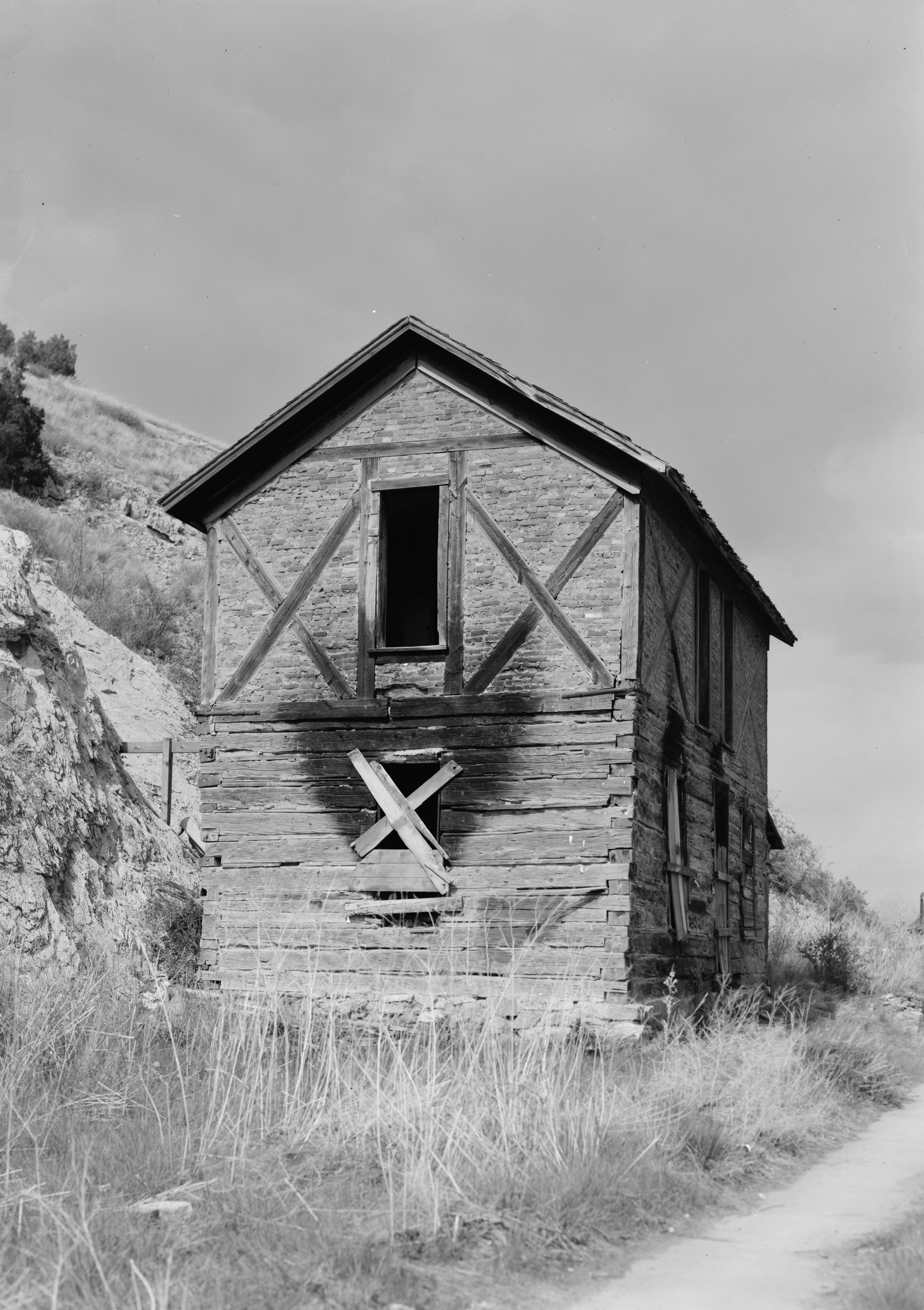
- Kluge House in July 1965

- Location within Montana Location within the United States
- Location: 540 W. Main St., Helena, Montana
- Coordinates: 46°35′22″N 111°55′47″W
- Area: 1 acre (0.40 ha)
- Built: 1882
- Architect: Emil Kluge
- Architectural style: Fachwerkbau
- NRHP reference No.: 70000358
- Added to NRHP: April 28, 1970

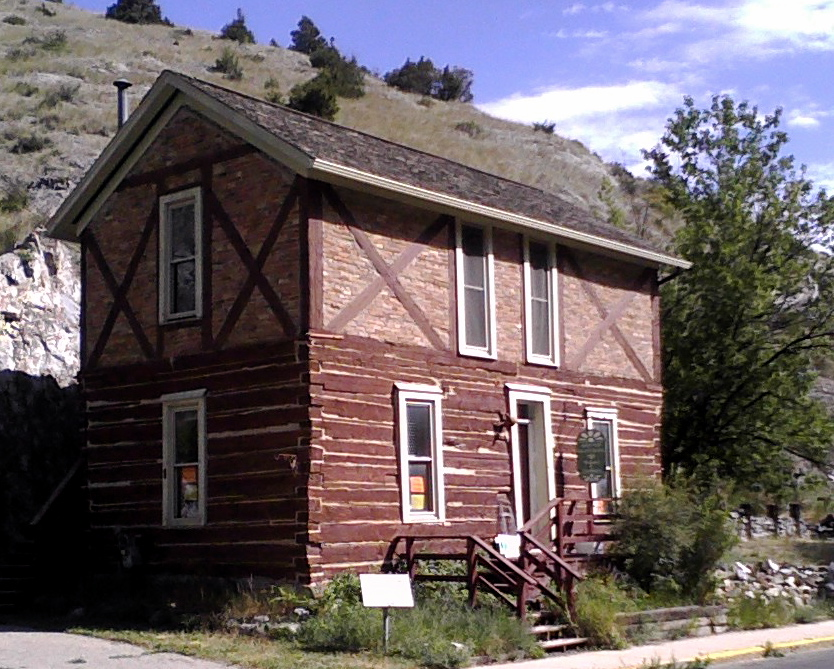
Kluge House in 2012

Kluge House, also known as Maverick House, is a rare example of Silesian fachwerk, log and half-timber construction, located in Helena, Montana. In mid-1964 the home was almost destroyed as a fire hazard as it had fallen into disrepair and transients were living in it. A shed is attached to the north side of the house. The second floor was built in 1882. Prior to that Kluge had apparently done significant work on the original cabin's first floor, which has hewn squared logs. The second floor is half-timber filled in with bricks. The second floor diagonal logs brace the framing logs. The overall dimensions of the house are 30'-11" x 16'-4" with a foundation of stone found locally. There are front and rear doors on the first floor. The front door is asymmetrically located and the rear door is near a corner. The second floor is reached only via an exterior staircase. The house has a brick fireplace. The first floor has an entrance vestibule and two rooms of dissimilar size. The smaller room has a hatch leading to a cellar. The second floor has a floor plan that is very similar to that of the first floor but it is reversed, i.e., two rooms and a vestibule. Floors are wooden.

Emil Kluge was born March 28, 1845, in Prussia. Kluge served in the infantry, in both the Austro-Prussian War in 1866 and the Franco-Prussian War in 1870, in the latter of which he was wounded. Kluge and his family came to America from Germany in 1871, first settling in Detroit, Michigan for two years, and then Helena, Montana, arriving on May 3, 1873. At that time, the family moved into this house, which was an abandoned miner's cabin. Kluge worked mostly as a contractor, but also as a gold prospector, constable, and Justice of the Peace. He was an officer in one of Helena's Masonic lodges and was a member of the Odd Fellows. Kluge resided in Helena until his death, September 26, 1924.

== See also ==
- National Register of Historic Places listings in Lewis and Clark County, Montana
