= Marysville, Montana =

Unincorporated community in Montana, United States

- Census-designated place
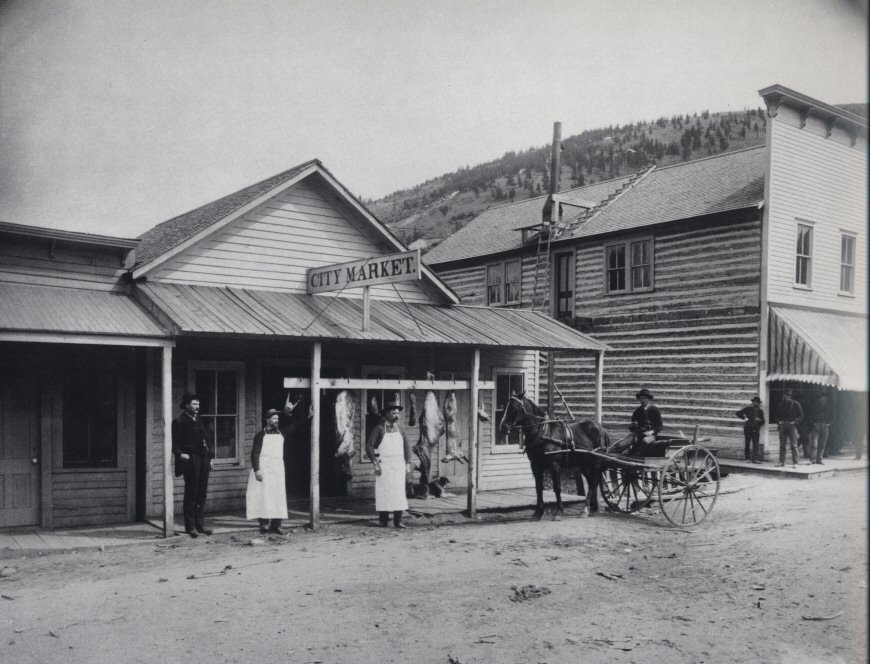
- City Meat Market, 1889

- Location within Montana Location within the United States
- Coordinates: 46°45′00″N 112°18′11″W
- Country: United States
- State: Montana
- County: Lewis and Clark
- Founded: 1876

Area
  - Total: 0.50 sq mi (1.29 km^{2})
  - Land: 0.50 sq mi (1.29 km^{2})
  - Water: 0 sq mi (0.00 km^{2})
- Elevation: 5,433 ft (1,656 m)

Population (2020)
  - Total: 82
  - Density: 164.8/sq mi (63.63/km^{2})
- Time zone: UTC-7 (MST)
  - Summer (DST): UTC-6 (MDT)
- FIPS code: 30-48250
- GNIS feature ID: 2583828

Marysville is an unincorporated community and census-designated place (CDP) in Lewis and Clark County, Montana, United States. As of the 2020 census, Marysville had a population of 82. Elevation is 5,413 ft (1,650 m).

== Demographics ==
Historical population
Census	Pop.	Note	%±
2020	82		—
U.S. Decennial Census

== History ==
Marysville was a bustling mining town of 3,000 residents in the 1880s and 1890s and was the center of gold mining in Montana. The town was named by Thomas Cruse, mine owner, to honor Mary Ralston the wife of a miner. A few buildings remain, including a baseball field with bleachers and the historic Methodist-Episcopal Church of Marysville. The population as of the 2010 census was 80.

== Geography and Location ==
Marysville is in southwestern Lewis and Clark County, 21 miles (34 km) by road northwest of Helena, the state capital. It is in the valley of Silver Creek, which flows east into the Helena Valley and joins the Missouri River. West of the town is the Great Divide Ski Area on the eastern and northern slopes of 7,331-foot (2,234 m) Mount Belmont, while down the road to the east is the Silver City Saloon on Highway 279. It is very close to the Great Divide ski area, and you can ski from late November to March.

According to the U.S. Census Bureau, the Marysville CDP has an area of 0.5 square miles (1.3 km^{2}), all land.

== Mining revival ==
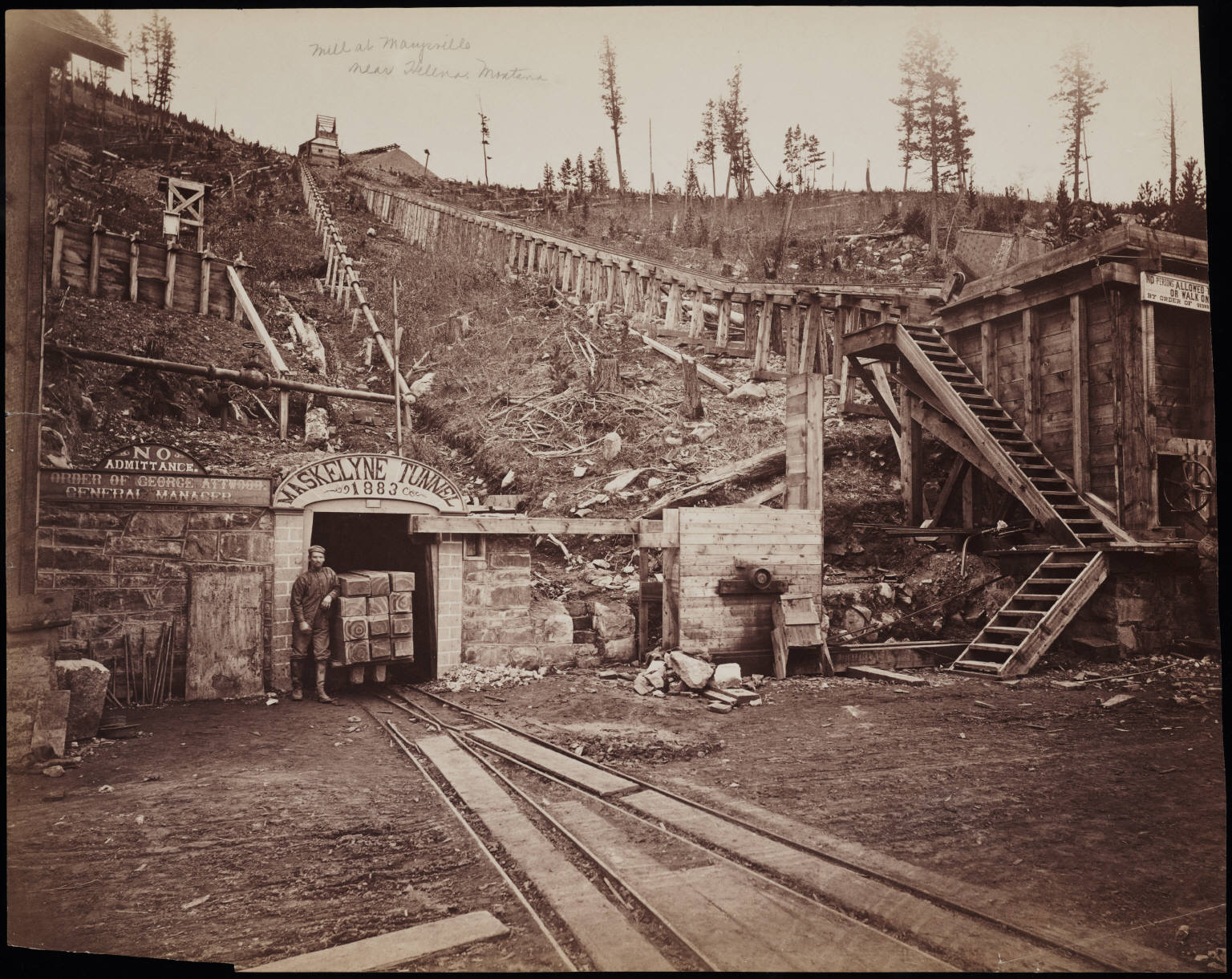
View of Marysville's mines, including the Maskelyne Tunnel (est. 1883) of the Drumlummon Mine. Photograph by Carleton E. Watkins (c. 1884–1890)

In 2010, there were news reports stating that recent exploration of the richest gold mine in the area, the Drumlummon Mine, had led to possible new discoveries. Its lower levels were allowed to flood when the mine was closed in 1904 during litigation. Sentiment in the town is mixed regarding possible resumption of extensive mining operations.

== Lore ==
Much of the lore in Marysville was centered on one Irishman, "Irish Tommy" Cruse. He came to the area to look for gold but would return with an empty poke and a smile. He didn't have much money and often slept in a bar counter in Helena. One day, in a site near present-day Marysville, he hit it rich. He named the site Drumlummon, after his birthplace in Ireland, and founded Marysville. It was named so because the first person there was a Mary Ralston (Samuel Ralston's wife) who was there to help Thomas while he was down and out prior to striking rich. Tommy got $150,000 before selling it for $1,500,000.

== Education ==
The elementary school district is Trinity Elementary School District, and the high school district is Helena High School District.
