= Helena South-Central Historic District =

Historic district in Montana, United States

- U.S. National Register of Historic Places
- U.S. Historic district
- Location within Montana
- Location: Roughly bounded by Broadway, S. Davis St., city limits, and S. Warren St., Helena, Montana
- Coordinates: 46.58302°N 112.03643°W
- Area: 95 acres (38 ha)
- Built: 1870
- Architect: multiple, including John C. Paulsen, J.G. Link, E.G. Bensen
- Architectural style: Greek Revival, Gothic Revival, Italianate;Queen Anne
- NRHP reference No.: 86002274
- Added to NRHP: July 28, 1986

The Helena South-Central Historic District is a collection of historic buildings located in Helena, Montana and roughly bounded by Broadway, South Davis Street, the city limits, and South Warren Street

== Contributing buildings ==
=== Martin M. Holter House ===
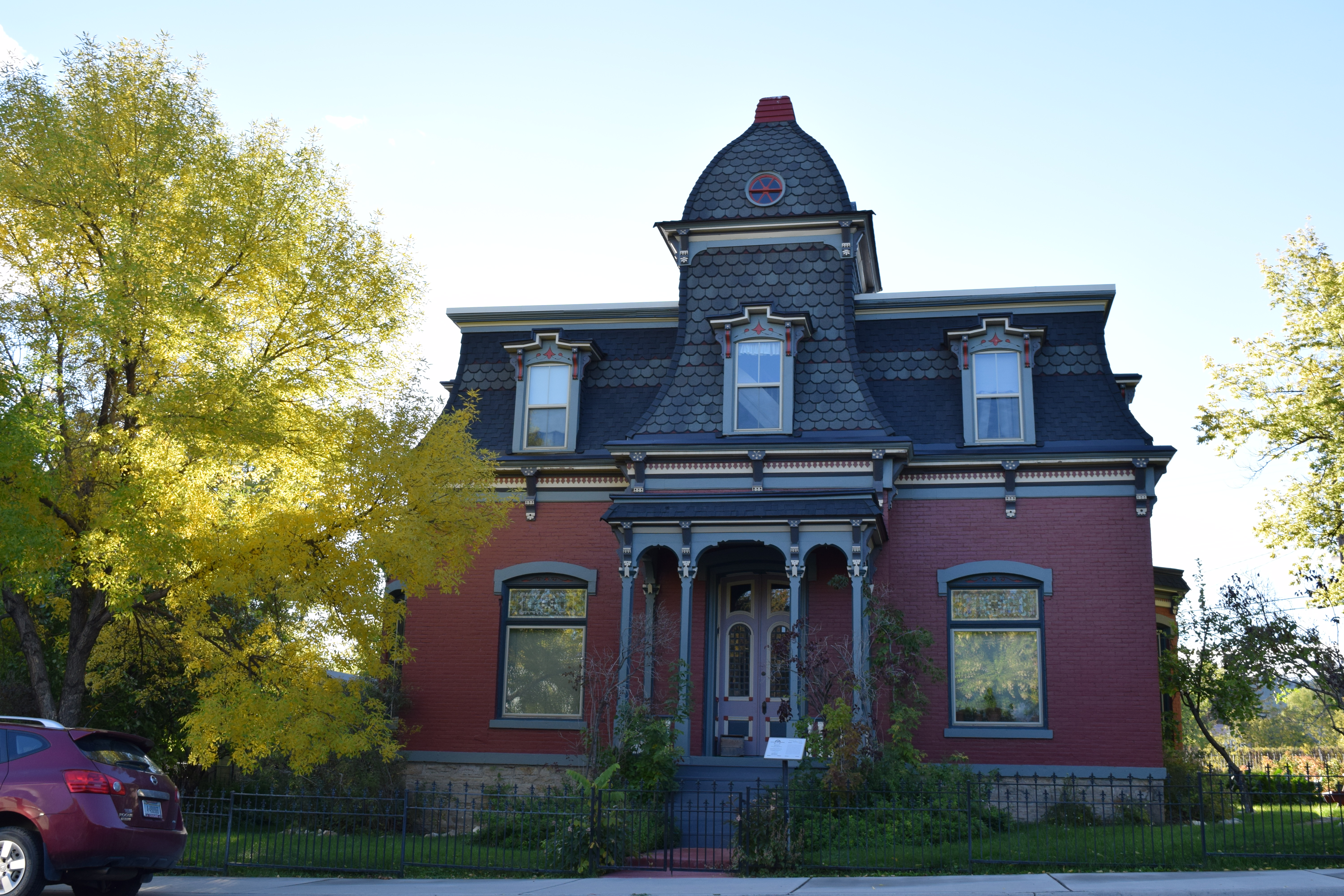
Martin M. Holter House

According to the Montana History Wiki:

"The flamboyant Second Empire style is exceptionally well articulated in this grand residence showcasing the considerable talent of its builder and original owner, Martin M. Holter. One of few well-preserved examples of this style in Montana, the beautifully restored residence offers a glimpse into the 1870s when the style enjoyed short-term popularity and Rodney Street was the town's most fashionable neighborhood. Holter and his brother, Anton, were Norwegian immigrants who established Helena's first sawmill in 1865. By 1867, the successful brothers operated several Helena businesses including a distillery and grocery. Martin built this magnificent home in the late 1870s. The distinctive central tower, mansard roof with elaborately capped dormers and ornately decorated eaves are characteristics of this style. The arched, multi-paned Venetian windows lighting the beautiful, very tall double entry doors open to an interior that continues the outer grandeur. Original hand-grained wood finishes, extraordinarily high ceilings, a wide upstairs central hall and an elegant curved stairway contribute to an overall impression of great space and luxury."

=== Ryan Building ===
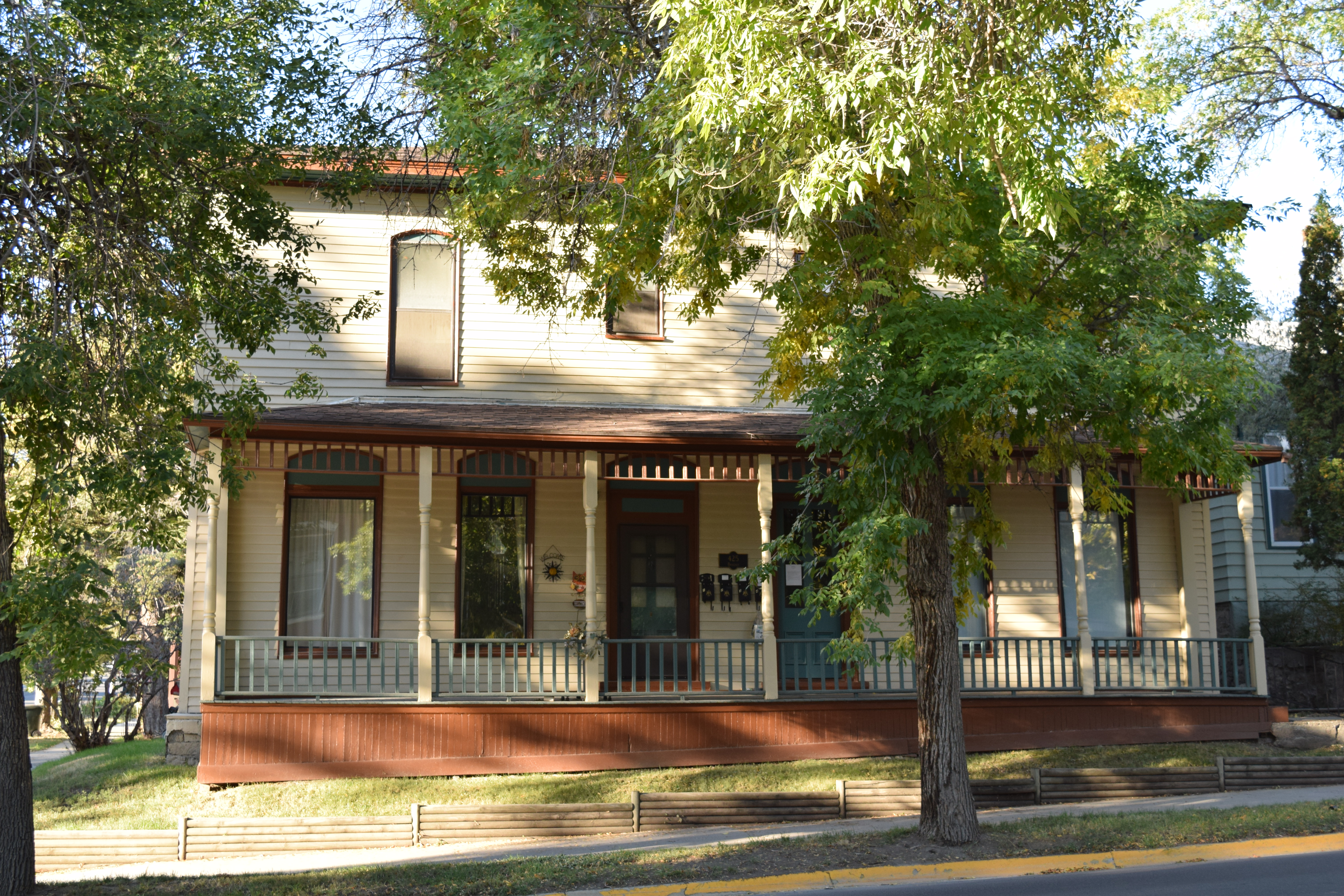

According to the Montana History Wiki: "Irish immigrant James M. Ryan owned a number of local rental properties, including this appealing wood-frame apartment building constructed as a duplex between 1885 and 1888. Rapid growth during the 1880s prompted neighborhood tenants to take in boarders, adding income and easing a troublesome housing shortage. This building provides an excellent example of the tenant/boarder relationship in its mix of both professional and working-class residents. In 1889 and 1890, these included a U.S. mineral surveyor, the Helena Herald city editor, a retired military officer, a blacksmith, a dressmaker, several clerks, and two domestics. When the 1935 earthquakes claimed the original brick veneer, shiplap siding added to the exterior walls was carefully cut, preserving the original arched windows. The entry vestibule to the two modern upper units, staircases, high ceilings, and several doors remain from the former era, lending period ambience. Modern residents still benefit from Ryan’s foresight in providing tenants attractive, well-located, and comfortable living quarters."
