= Lincoln Lodge =

- U.S. National Register of Historic Places
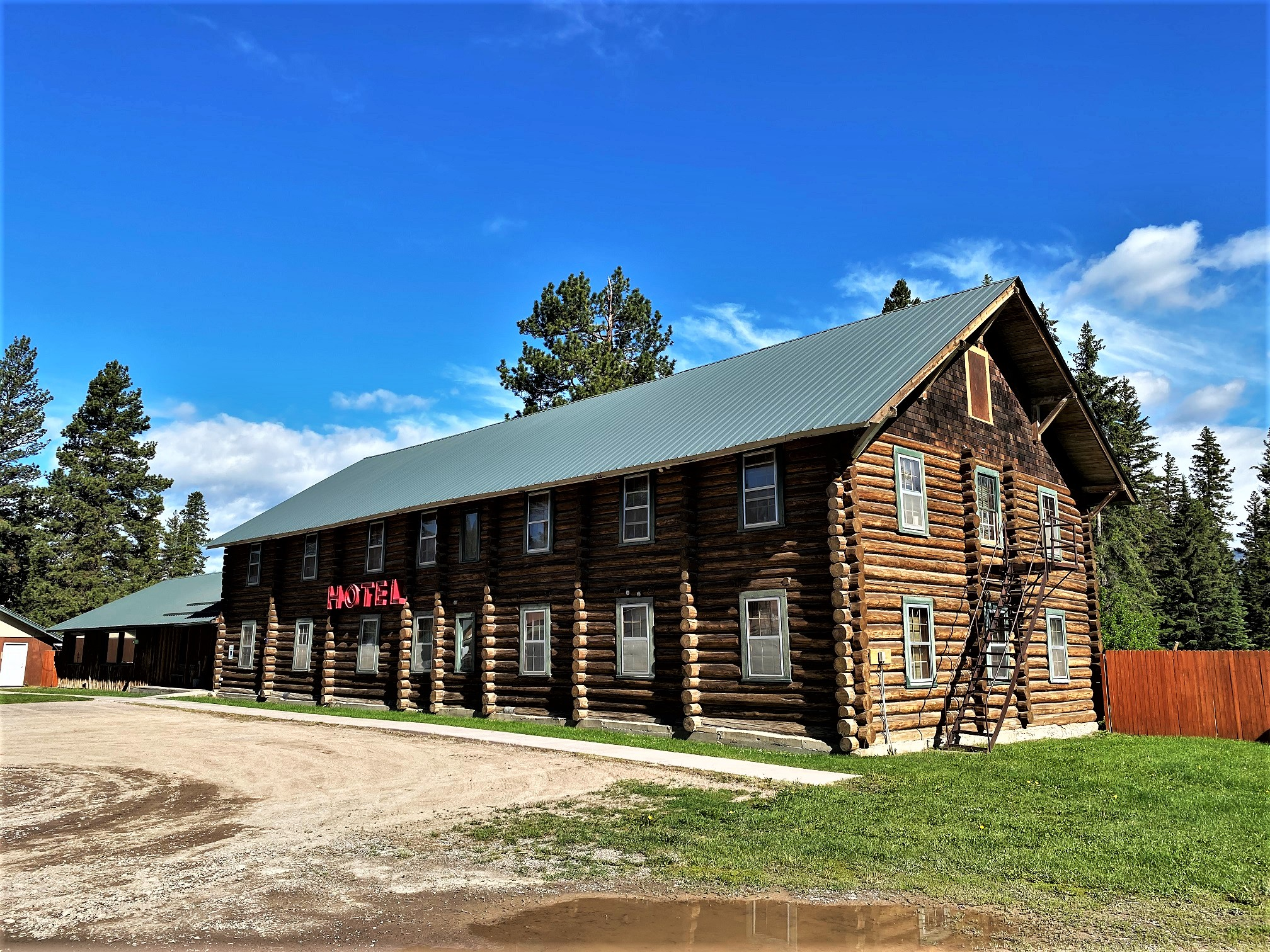

- Location within Montana Location within the United States
- Location: Stemple Pass Rd. Lincoln, Montana
- Coordinates: 46°57′23″N 112°40′50″W
- Area: 2 acres (0.81 ha)
- Built: 1929
- Built by: Leonard Lambkin
- Architectural style: Adirondack Rustic style
- NRHP reference No.: 86002931
- Added to NRHP: October 23, 1986

The Lincoln Lodge, on Stemple Pass Rd. in Lincoln, Montana, was built in 1929. It was listed on the National Register of Historic Places in 1986.

It was deemed "significant for its architecture as an excellent example of a vernacular Rustic design influenced by the Adirondack Rustic style, popularized in the Adirondack region of northern New York from 1870 to 1930. Built in 1929, the 22-room summer camp uses native building materials and designs in the context of the mountainous natural environment of the Helena National Forest to evoke a sense of rugged, rustic craftsmanship. Lincoln Lodge is also significant for its associative link with the original owner, Leonard Lambkin, a locally prominent entrepreneur who actively promoted tourism and recreational opportunities in Lincoln."

It is a two-story, gable-roofed log building on a concrete foundation, about 32 by 80 feet (9.8 m × 24.4 m) in plan. Around 1960 it was expanded by a one-story ranch style addition which holds a motel office and residence for the owner.
