= Robert and Elizabeth Fisk House =

Historic house in Montana, United States

- Fisk, Robert and Elizabeth, House
- U.S. National Register of Historic Places
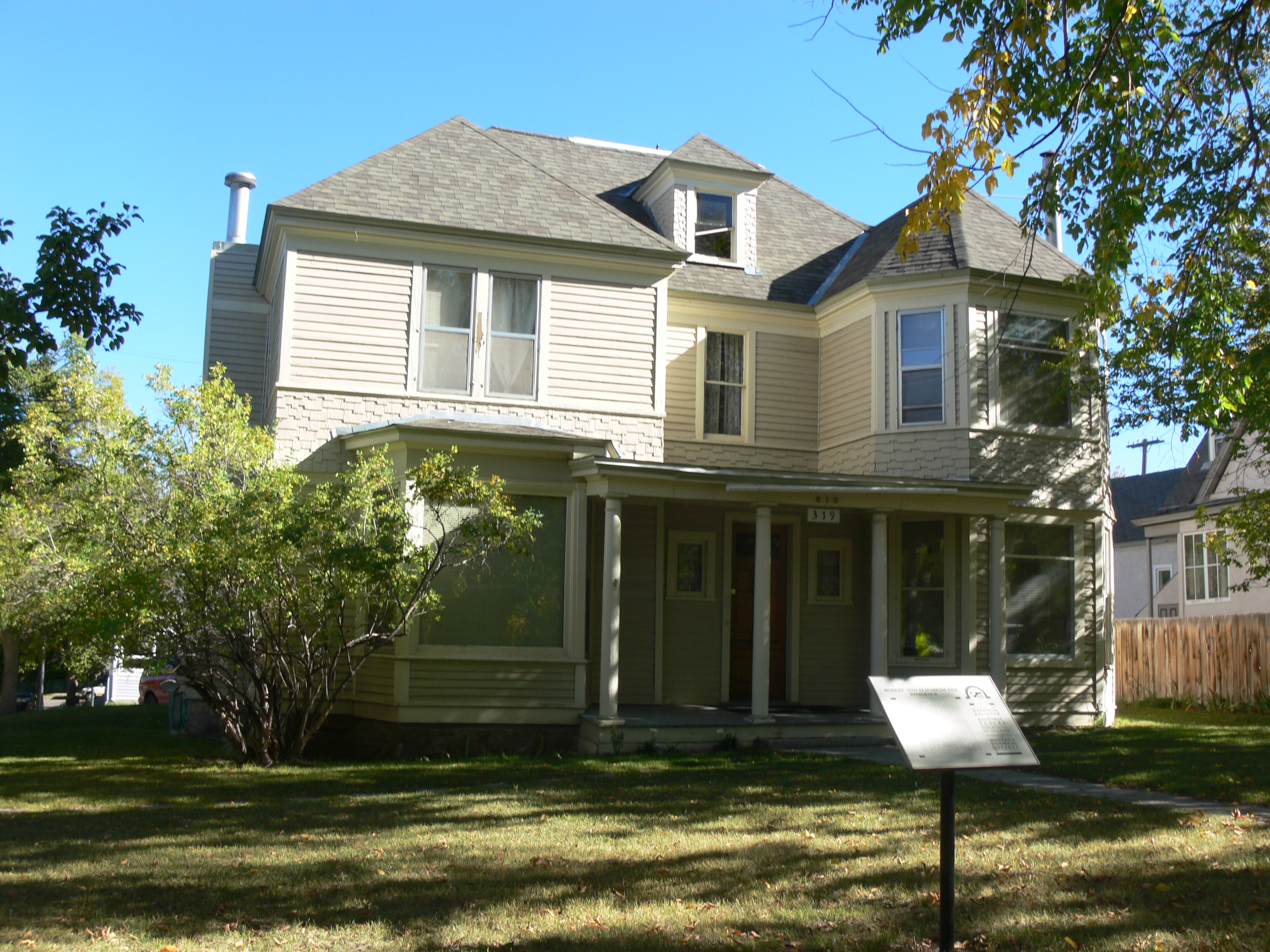
- Location: Helena, Montana
- Built: 1871
- Architectural style: Late Victorian
- NRHP reference No.: 06001248
- Added to NRHP: 2007

The Robert and Elizabeth Fisk House is a historic home in Helena, Montana. Built in the mid 19th century by the Fisk family, the residence was added to the National Register of Historic Places in 2007.

== History ==
The Robert and Elizabeth Fisk House was built in Helena, Montana in 1871. At the time, Helena was in the midst of an economic boom fueled by the local mining industry. The home was built by Colonel Robert Fisk and his wife Elizabeth Fisk, two prominent Montanans who had moved to Helena in 1867. Robert was an editor for The Helena Herald, a local newspaper, while Elizabeth was active in the local political and church scene. The Fisk's home was built on North Rodney Street, and was located close to the Governor's Mansion. Due to Elizabeth's political and social activism, the Fisk house became a center cultural in Helena.

While Helena prospered in the 1870s and 1880s, the Panic of 1893 caused the city to experience an economic downturn. Despite the poor economy, the Fisks remained in Helena, and even went so far as to add an addition to their home during the 1890s. The Fisks remained in the Fisk House until the 1902, when Robert Fisk sold The Helena Herald and the family moved to Berkeley, California.

The house was added to the National Register of Historic Places on 17 January 2009. The home remains in relatively the same state as it did in the 1890s.

== Design ==
The Fisk House is a two-story home. The house is made of wood built on a stone foundation. The home is designed along the lines of Late Victorian architecture.

== See also ==
- National Register of Historic Places listings in Lewis and Clark County, Montana
