= Hauser Mansion =

Historic house in Montana, United States

- U.S. National Register of Historic Places
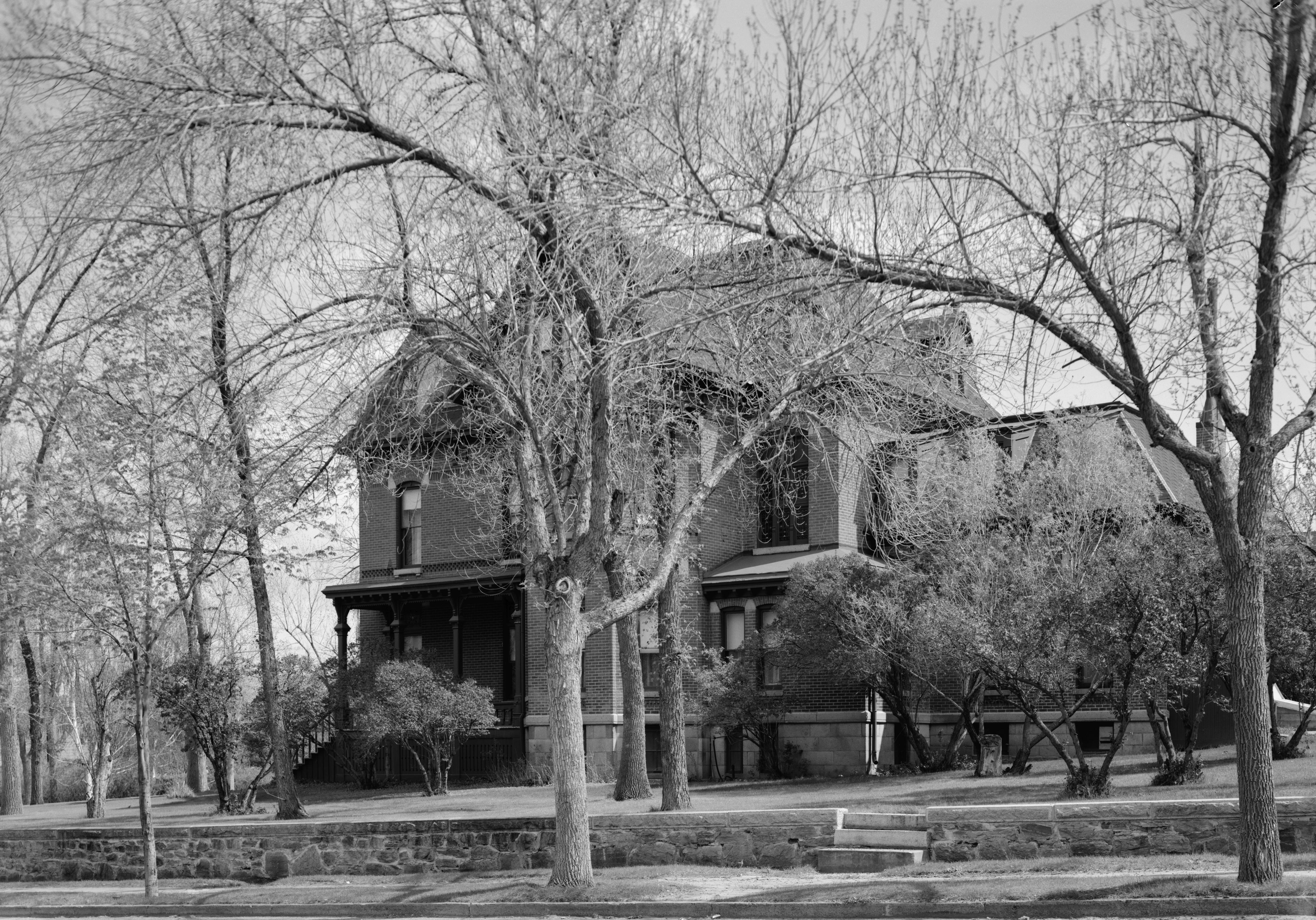
- The Hauser Mansion in 1965

- Location within Montana Location within the United States
- Location: 720 Madison Avenue, Helena, Montana
- Coordinates: 46°35′43″N 112°2′39″W
- Area: 0.5 acres (0.20 ha)
- Built: 1885
- NRHP reference No.: 79001404
- Added to NRHP: February 12, 1979

Hauser Mansion is a historic house in Helena, Montana, U.S., built in 1885 for Governor Samuel Thomas Hauser. In 2024 it was purchased by Governor Greg Gianforte and his wife Susan with the declared intention of donating it to become the governor's mansion.

== History ==
The house was built in 1885 for Governor Samuel Hauser. It was designed by the architectural firm Wallace & Thornburg. It was inherited by his daughter, Ellen Hauser Thatcher, in 1913, and subsequently sold to the Roman Catholic Bishop of Helena, John P. Carroll, followed by other bishops. From 1935 to 1969, it was used by the Sisters of Charity of Leavenworth. It was purchased by Governor Tim Babcock in 1969. It has been listed on the National Register of Historic Places since February 12, 1979.

In January 2024, Governor Greg Gianforte and his wife Susan announced they had bought the Hauser Mansion and intended to make it their residence for the remainder of his term and then donate it to the State of Montana as a governor's residence. The state legislature has appropriated funds for its renovation.

== See also ==
- National Register of Historic Places listings in Lewis and Clark County, Montana
