= Porter Flats Apartments =

Building in Helena, Montana, U.S.

- U.S. National Register of Historic Places
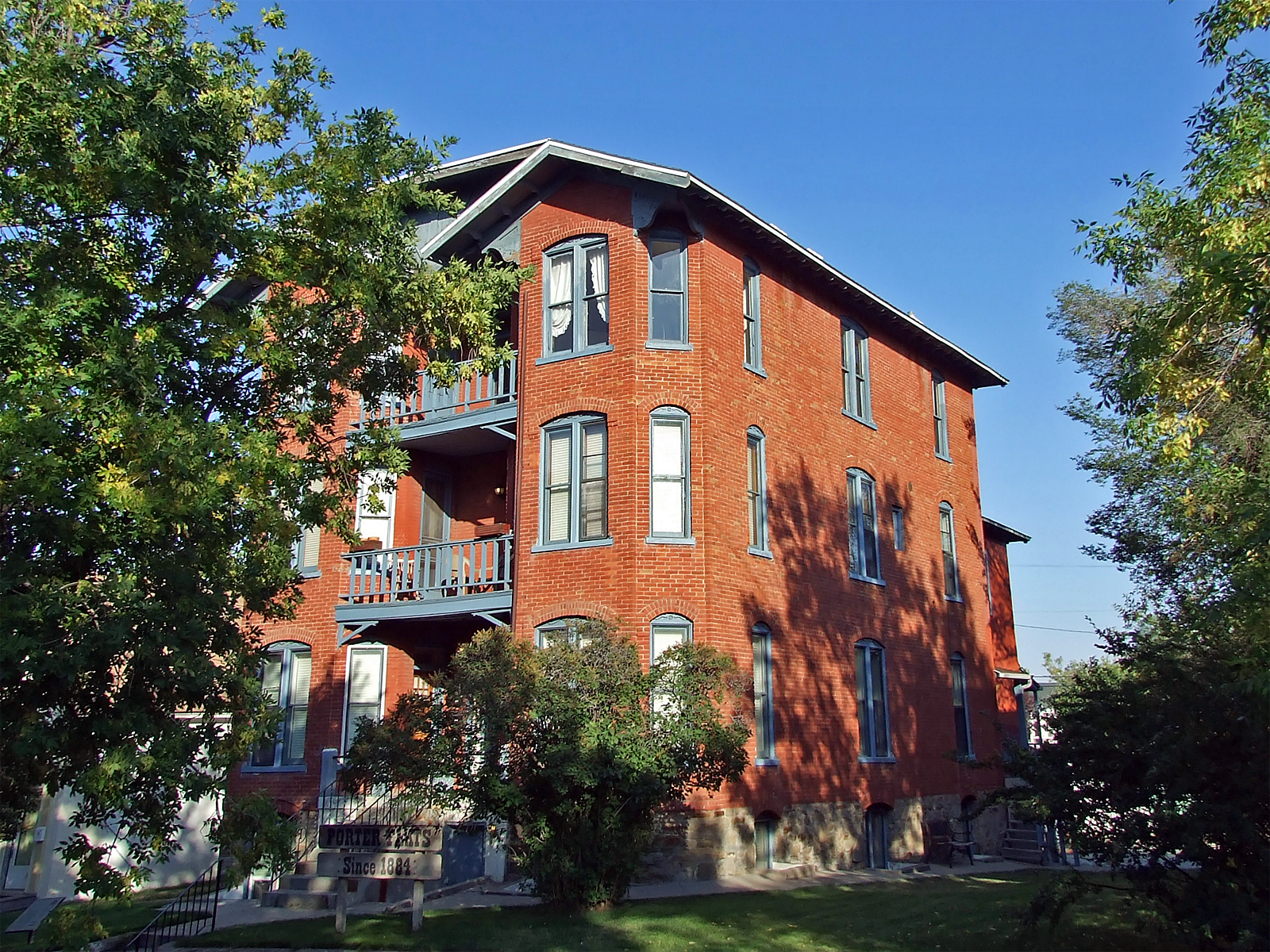
- The building in 2012

- Location within Montana Location within the United States
- Location: 335 North Ewing Street, Helena, Montana
- Coordinates: 46°35′15″N 112°02′02″W
- Area: less than one acre
- Built: 1884
- Built by: James Porter
- Architectural style: Italianate
- NRHP reference No.: 92001761
- Added to NRHP: January 14, 1993

Porter Flats Apartments is a historic residential building in Helena, Montana. It was designed in the Italianate style, and built in 1884 by James Porter, a farmer, schoolteacher and real estate developer. It is "purported to be the first apartment building constructed in Helena." It was listed on the National Register of Historic Places in 1993.
