= Methodist-Episcopal Church of Marysville =

Historic church in Montana, United States

- U.S. National Register of Historic Places

- Location within Montana
- Location: 3rd St., Marysville, Montana
- Coordinates: 46°45′05″N 112°17′58″W
- Area: less than one acre
- Built: 1887
- NRHP reference No.: 84002489
- Added to NRHP: January 5, 1984

Methodist-Episcopal Church of Marysville (also known as the ME Church of Marysville) is a historic Methodist church at 3rd Street in Marysville, Montana.

The Methodist church was built in 1887 during the local gold rush, and the church was abandoned in 1939. John W. and Margaret C. Hollow of Helena bought the church in 1967 and restored it over the following years. The building was added to the National Register of Historic Places on January 5, 1984.
