= Wick-Seiler House =

Historic house in Montana, United States

- Wick--Seiler House
- U.S. National Register of Historic Places
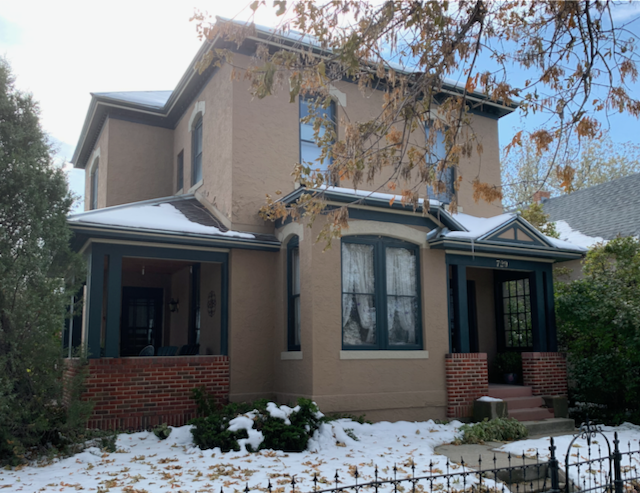
- The house in 2019

- Location within Montana Location within the United States
- Location: 729 11th Avenue, Helena, Montana
- Coordinates: 46°35′22″N 112°01′38″W
- Area: less than one acre
- Built: 1888
- Built by: Joseph F. Evans
- Architectural style: Italianate
- NRHP reference No.: 00000873
- Added to NRHP: August 2, 2000

The Wick-Seiler House is a historic house in Helena, Montana. It was designed in the Italianate style, and built in 1888 for John Wick and his wife, née Philipia Offenbaker, two immigrants from Germany. The Wicks lived here with their three children, including Elizabeth, who married Arthur Seiler, also an immigrant from Germany, and later lived in the house with her family. The house was listed on the National Register of Historic Places in 2000.
