= Tower Rock State Park =

State park in Montana, US

- IUCN category III (natural monument or feature)
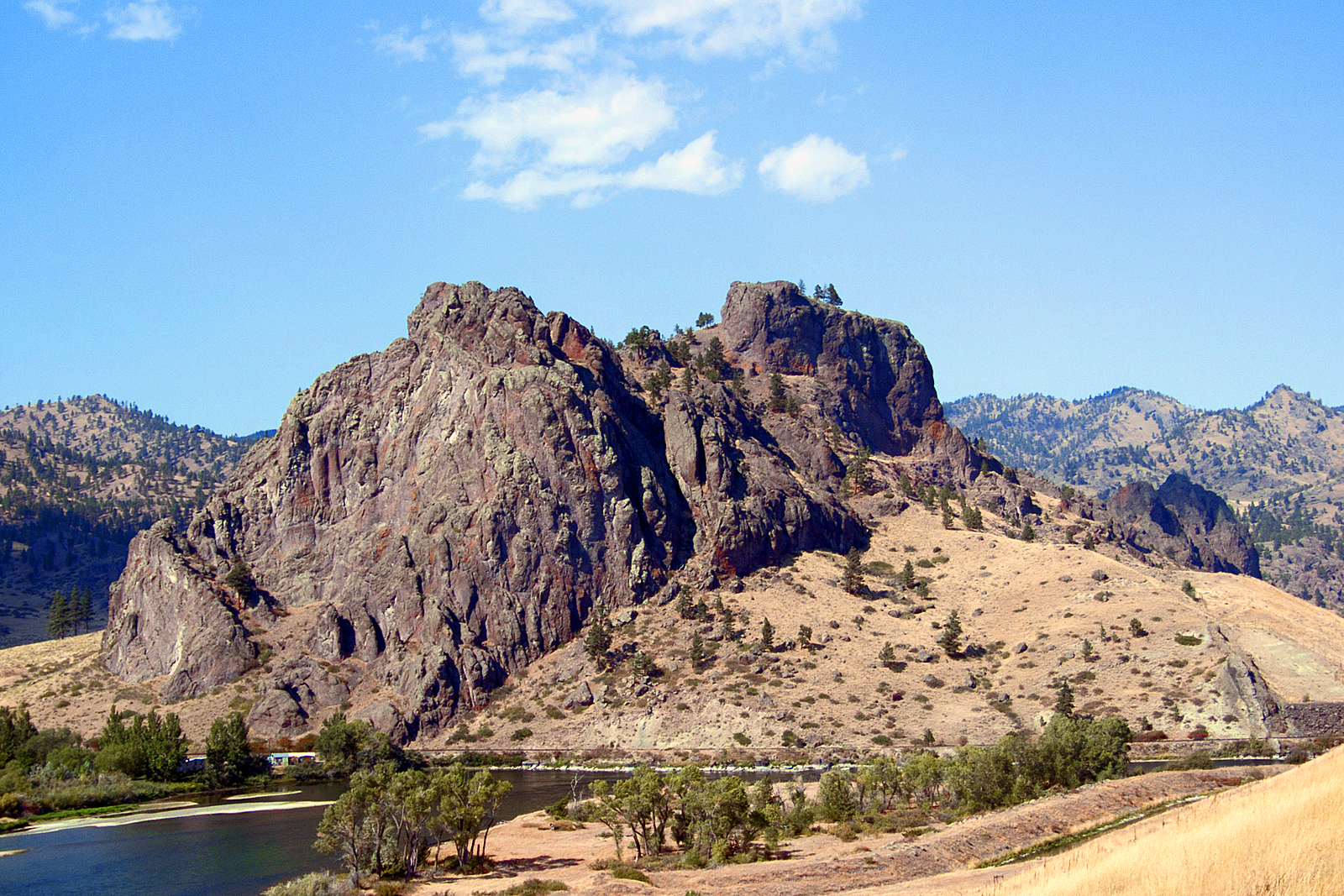
- Tower Rock, southeast side

- Location within Montana
- Location: Cascade County, Montana, U.S.
- Nearest city: Cascade, Montana, U.S.
- Coordinates: 47°11′20″N 111°48′36″W
- Area: 140 acres (0.57 km^{2})
- Designated: February 2004
- Visitors: 9,333 (in 2023)
- Governing body: Montana Department of Fish, Wildlife and Parks
- Website: stateparks.mt.gov/tower-rock
- Tower Rock
- U.S. National Register of Historic Places
- Area: 87.2 acres (0.353 km^{2})
- NRHP reference No.: 02000213
- Added to NRHP: March 18, 2002

Tower Rock State Park is a state park near the community of Cascade in the U.S. state of Montana in the United States. The centerpiece of the park is Tower Rock, a 424-foot (129 m)-high rock formation which marks the entrance to the Missouri River Canyon in the Adel Mountains Volcanic Field. It was well known to Native Americans, and considered a sacred place by the Piegan Blackfeet. Tower Rock received its current name when Meriwether Lewis of the Lewis and Clark Expedition visited the site in 1805. Railroad and highway development in the late 1800s and 1900s skirted Tower Rock, but the landform itself remained pristine. The 87.2 acres (0.353 km^{2}) encompassing Tower Rock was added to the National Register of Historic Places on March 18, 2002. The 140-acre (0.57 km^{2}) Tower Rock State Park was created around the National Historic Site in 2004.

== About Tower Rock ==
Tower Rock is located in the Adel Mountains Volcanic Field. The Adel Mountains Volcanic Field is a 3,280-foot (1,000 m) thick unit which lies unconformably on top of Cretaceous sedimentary rock of the Two Medicine Formation on the edge of the Great Falls Tectonic Zone. The age of the volcanic field has been estimated to range from 60 million years to 66 million years old to 81 to 71 million years old, although most estimates today place its age at 75 million years.

Tower Rock is a shonkinite intrusion. As the surrounding rock weathered, the harder shonkinite remained behind. The rock is roughly oblong, occupying about 87.2 acres (0.353 km^{2}). The landform is 424-foot (129 m) high, and consists of clear outcrops at the north and south ends connected by a broken saddle ridge. The southern outcrop is 161 feet (49 m) higher than the northern outcrop. At its highest point, Tower Rock is 3,976 feet (1,212 m) above sea level.

Tower Rock is heavily weathered, with the east side covered in scree. The flat areas around Tower Rock are old channels of the Missouri River. Thin topsoil covers the base on the north, south, and west sides, with juniper and stunted fir trees, grasses, and sagebrush the dominant plant species. The south side of Tower Rock abuts the Missouri River, where the rock face is almost vertical.

== History of Tower Rock ==
=== Native Americans and Lewis and Clark ===
Toward the end of the last glacial period, Tower Rock became inundated. The Pinedale Glaciation (an ice sheet formed from glaciers originating in the Rocky Mountains) and the Laurentide Ice Sheet (an ice sheet which covered the Great Plains) blocked the Missouri River, which at that time flowed north into a terminal lake. As riverwater and glacial meltwater pooled at the base of the glacier, it created Lake Great Falls. All but 15 feet (4.6 m) of Tower Rock was covered with the lake's waters.

Native Americans were well acquainted with Tower Rock. The Bitterroot Salish and Lower Kootenay often passed by Tower Rock on their way through the Adel Mountains Volcanic Field to hunting grounds. The Piegan Blackfeet often wintered near present-day Helena, Montana, and passed through the Adel Mountains Volcanic Field by following the Missouri River. Wickiup frames were often built in the area and reused as native people moved to their summer hunting grounds and back to their winter camps. The Piegan Blackfeet considered Tower Rock sacred, and conducted ceremonies there. Individual Blackfeet also visited the site alone for prayer and meditation.

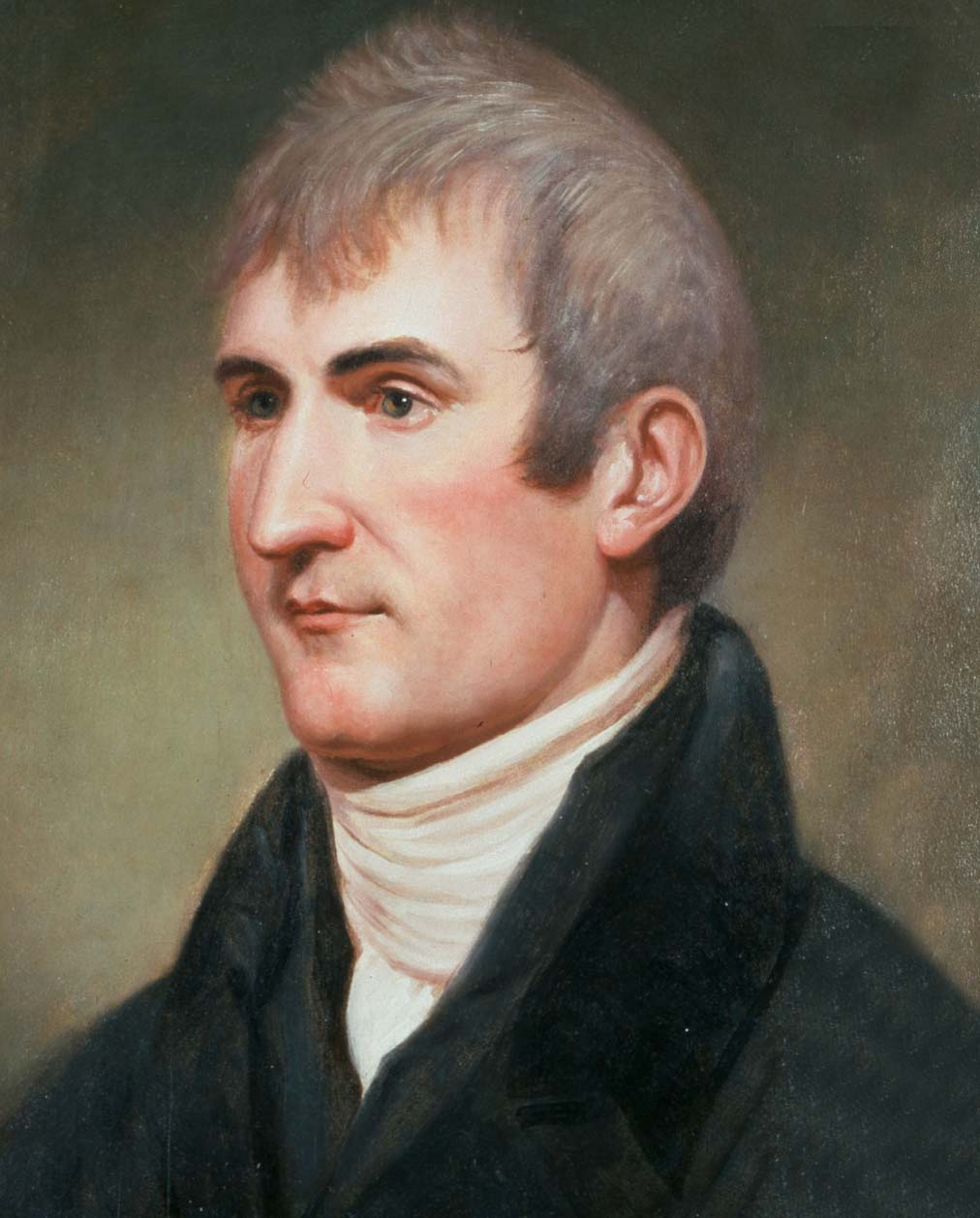
Meriwether Lewis.

Tower Rock received its modern name from Meriwether Lewis on July 16, 1805. Tower Rock marked the boundary where the Lewis and Clark Expedition left the Great Plains and entered the Rocky Mountains. Having completed the portage around the Great Falls of the Missouri and made enough canoes to carry their baggage, the expedition set out from White Bear Island (a little more than 1.5 miles (2.4 km) south of present-day Great Falls, Montana) on July 15. Starting near dawn on July 16, Lewis took ailing expedition members Jean Baptiste Lepage and John Potts and set out on foot to explore ahead. Following an Indian trail, they passed Half-Breed Rapids. Lewis and his companions then became the first non-natives to see Tower Rock that afternoon. Lewis gave the landmark its name in his journal:

at this place there is a large rock of 400 feet high w[h]ich stands immediately in the gap which the missouri makes on it's passage from the mountains; it is insulated from the neighbouring mountains by a handsome little plain which surrounds it[s] base on 3 sides and the Missouri washes it's base on the other, leaving it on the Lard. as it de[s]cends. this rock I called the tower. it may be ascended with some difficulty nearly to its summit, and from it there is a most pleasing view of the country we are now about to leave. from it I saw this evening immence herds of buffaloe in the plains below. (Note: Spellings and capitalization as in the original. "Lard" means "larboard", or to Lewis' left.) (Note: Lewis probably climbed the southern promontory.)

Tower Rock was visited by a member of the expedition again in 1806. The expedition remained a single party after departing Fort Clatsop on the Pacific Ocean. Having reached Traveler's Rest (near present-day Lolo, Montana), Lewis and Clark decided to split the expedition in two. Lewis took nine men and proceeded due east, intending to find the Marias River again. (Note: The 1783 Treaty of Paris ended the American Revolutionary War. That treaty established the 50th parallel north as the boundary between the United States and British Canada. Lewis wanted to see if the Marias River reached the 50th parallel.) Clark, meanwhile, proceeded south-southeast toward the headwaters of the Missouri, intending to locate the source of the Yellowstone River and explore it until its confluence with the Missouri. Lewis' group did not visit Tower Rock. (Note: Lewis' party followed the Bitterroot River a few miles north to the Clark Fork River, then the Clark Fork a few miles east to the Blackfoot River. They followed a Hidatsa trail along the Blackfoot River to a point about 9 miles (14 km) east of present-day Lincoln, Montana, where the trail ran north along Alice Creek. Lewis' party then followed Alice Creek north to Lewis and Clark Pass. There the group crossed the Continental Divide, and followed Green Creek down onto the Great Plains below. Traveling north along the Rocky Mountain Front, the party roughly paralleled Montana Secondary Highway 434, crossed the Dearborn River, and reached the Sun River. Lewis' group followed the Sun River back to the Missouri and the camp at White Bear Island.) The main party under Clark followed the Bitterroot River south to Sula, Montana, where it turned south toward Gibbons Pass and the crossing of the Continental Divide. Following a series of creeks and trails southwestward, Clarks' party reached the Big Hole River, following it to the Jefferson River and then to the Missouri again. At Three Forks (where the Jefferson, Gallatin, and Madison rivers join to form the Missouri River), on July 13, 1806, Clark ordered Sergeant John Ordway to take a group of nine and go down the Missouri to the camp at White Bear Island and there await Meriwether Lewis. (Note: In Ordway's party were John Collins, John Colter, Pierre Cruzatte, Thomas Howard, Jean Baptiste Lepage, John Potts, Peter M. Weiser, Joseph Whitehouse, and Alexander Hamilton Willard.) On the afternoon of July 17, the Ordway party approached Tower Rock. But high winds came up, causing heavy waves which nearly swamped the canoes. The Ordway group was forced to spend the afternoon and night near Tower Rock before proceeding past Half-Breed Rapids the next day. Ordway reached White Bear Island on July 19.

=== Railroad, settlement, and highways ===
The Missouri River canyon between Helena and Cascade was largely bypassed by white settlers for the next 65 years. In part, this was because easier routes allowed access to the western mountains and valleys, but also because the Piegan Blackfeet continued to claim the area as their own and were notoriously hostile to intruders.

From 1859 to 1860, the Mullan Road was constructed from Fort Benton, then part of Dakota Territory, to Fort Walla Walla, Washington Territory. The Mullan Road bypassed Tower Rock and its canyon: The Mullan Road only followed the Missouri River until it reached the Dearborn River. Rather than enter the Missouri River canyon, it struck inland and passed south through a wide, flat prairie about 15 miles (24 km) west of the river. This allowed the road to skirt the rugged Adel Mountains Volcanic Field. (Note: U.S. Route 287 largely follows Mullan's road across this prairie to Little Prickly Pear Creek.) The Mullan Road then followed the valley of Little Prickly Pear Creek back to the Missouri River near present-day Wolf Creek, Montana. North of Helena, the road left the Missouri and followed Tenmile Creek and Austin Creek up to Mullan Pass, where it crossed the Continental Divide. In 1866, the Little Prickly Pear Wagon Road Company secured a license to manage the Mullan Road from Craig to Helena, and made significant improvements to it.

In 1872, engineer Thomas Roberts surveyed the valley for the Northern Pacific Railway. Roberts recommended that the railway ship goods via steamship through the canyon rather than by railroad. The plan was not acted on. Two years later, however, the railroad contracted with the Diamond R Freight Company to build a wagon road from Helena through the canyon past Tower Rock to the new trading post of Carroll at the headwaters of the Musselshell River. The "Carroll Trail" was constructed, but closed in 1876 due to hostility from Native Americans and shifts in the Missouri River's channel. In 1885, the St. Paul, Minneapolis & Manitoba Railway (which later became part of the Great Northern Railway) decided to connect the burgeoning mining district around Butte, Montana, with Helena and the nascent city of Great Falls. Surveyors and engineers began grading a route between Helena and Great Falls through the Missouri River canyon in the winter of 1885-1886, and by the end of 1886 had surveyed a route from Helena to Butte. Construction on the Great Northern's line westward began in late 1886, The railroad line passed between Tower Rock and the river, forcing the construction crews to do some blasting to clear room at the extreme edge of the landmark's base. On October 16, 1887, the link between Devils Lake, North Dakota; Fort Assinniboine (near the present-day city of Havre); and Great Falls was complete. Service from Great Falls to Helena began in November 1887, and Butte followed on November 10, 1888.

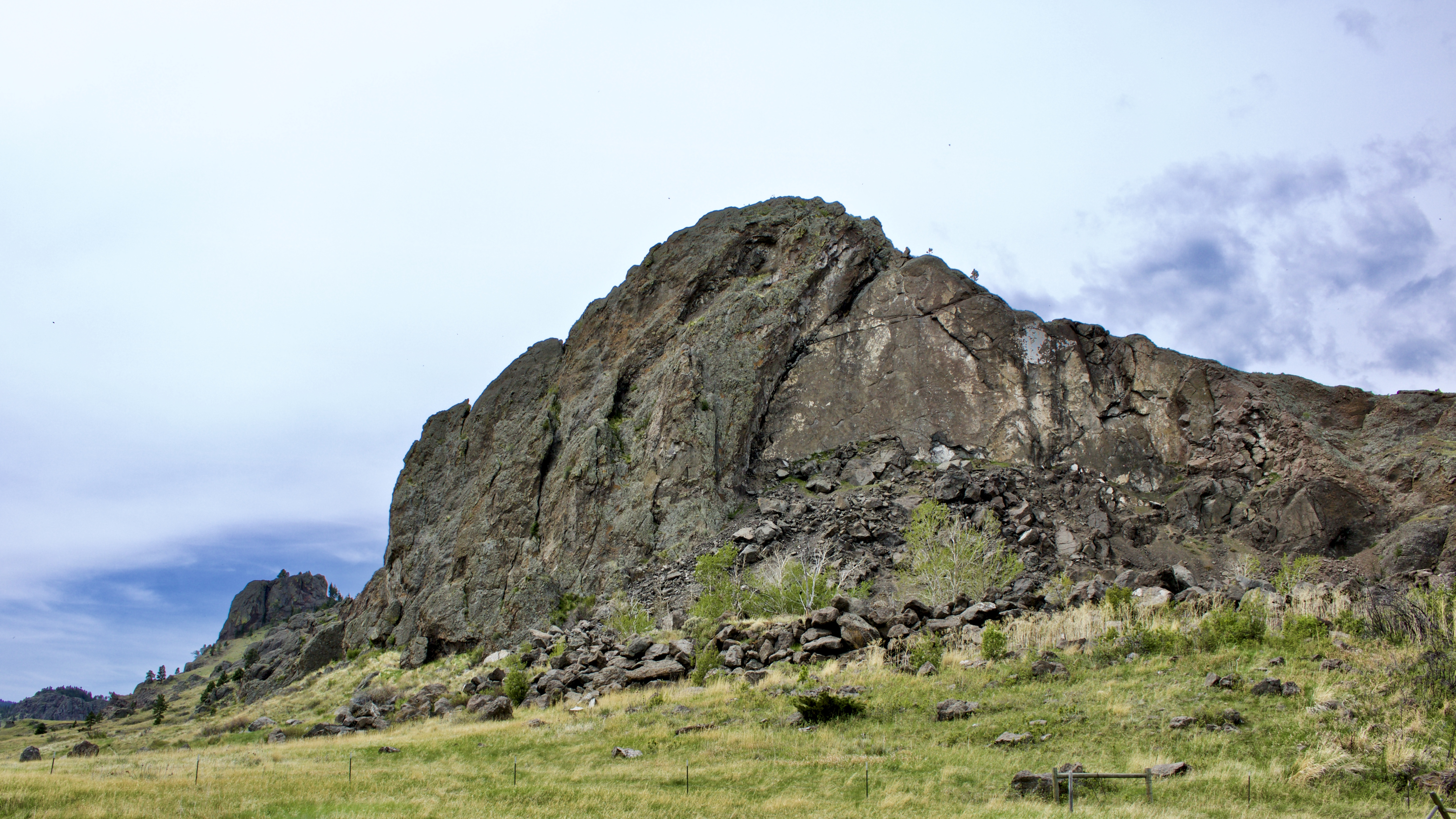
North end of formation

The unincorporated hamlet of Hardy was established on the north boundary of Tower Rock as a siding by the Montana Central Railway in 1888. Named for rancher Rufus Hardy, who in 1866 became the first white settler on the west bank of the river in the canyon, the settlement was given a post office the year it was founded. Although the town had 52 residents in the 1910s, a depression in the agricultural sector in the 1920s and the Great Depression reduced its population to near zero. By 1934, Hardy consisted only of the railroad station and a tool shed.

No road passed by Tower Rock until 1932. The route of the old Mullan Road served as the only automobile link between Cascade and Helena. In 1921, the state of Montana and the counties of Cascade and Lewis and Clark jointly proposed building a road on the east bank of the Missouri River between the towns of Hardy and Craig. (Note: A county road extended from Great Falls to Cascade, but sources are unclear if it extended as far as Hardy.) The route would have avoided Tower Rock. But this project was never acted on. Beginning in 1928, businessmen in Great Falls, Cascade, and Helena began petitioning the state of Montana to build a state highway from Cascade to Wolf Creek through the Missouri River. This project, whose route was on the west bank of the Missouri and largely paralleled the railroad tracks, was approved. The area was still sparsely settled, and little blasting or digging had to be done as the route went around Tower Rock to the west rather than east. Contracts for the project were first let in 1929, although most construction occurred in 1930 and 1931. The road through the Missouri River canyon was completed in 1932, and all of Highway 91 in Montana opened by 1935. (The Hardy Bridge, located 0.5 miles (0.80 km) south of Tower Rock, was constructed as part of this project.) The segment from Cascade to Wolf Creek provided some of the most extensive views of any highway in the state.

In the 1960s, Interstate 15 (I-15) was constructed next to Tower Rock. The general route of I-15 was established by 1957 (a year after passage of the Federal Aid Highway Act of 1956 which established funding for the interstate highway system), but there were 11 specific alternative routes available. These were narrowed down to just three, with the chosen route following the route of Highway 91 through the Missouri Canyon and past Tower Rock. This route provided both lower construction and maintenance costs, and had the added benefit of allowing Highway 91 to act as a frontage road. State planners also chose to build a four-lane rather than two-lane interstate, arguing that it was less expensive to build a four-lane road now than to widen the route in the future. I-15 in obliterated parts of Highway 91, and paralleled it in other places. I-15 deviated from the route of Highway 91 by passing Tower Rock to the east. The segment of I-15 between Helena and Great Falls opened in 1968.

== About the park ==
=== Legal history of the site ===
Tower Rock had been claimed by Native Americans, the United Kingdom, Spain, and France before becoming part of the United States in 1803 through the Louisiana Purchase. The territory's name and boundaries changed extensively over the next 60 years (Note: It became part of the District of Louisiana in 1804, the Louisiana Territory in 1805, the Missouri Territory in 1812, unorganized territory in 1821, the Nebraska Territory in 1854, and the Dakota Territory in 1861.) until Tower Rock fell under the federal government's jurisdiction as part of the Montana Territory, which was organized on May 26, 1864.

Tower Rock straddles two sections of land, Section 35, T17N, R2W ("Section 35") and Section 36, T17N, R2W ("Section 36"). The federal government granted title to Section 35 to the Northern Pacific Railway in May 1870. The Northern Pacific gave its title back to the state in a land swap in July 1898, and 160 acres (0.65 km^{2}) of Section 35 (including a portion of Tower Rock) was purchased by white settler Allen Woods in August 1898. Woods raised beef and dairy cattle on the parcel before returning title to the state in July 1904. Four months later, his brother, George Woods, purchased the 160-acre tract. Section 36 was designated school trust land by the federal government in 1898, (Note: Since 1787, federal law in the U.S. had designated one-sixteenth of all new territory to be held in trust for the support of local and state school systems.) but the state transferred 120 acres (0.49 km^{2}) of Section 36 (including a portion of Tower Rock) to Rufus Hardy in 1904. White settle James Austin purchased 134 acres (0.54 km^{2}) of Hardy's land (not including Tower Rock) in November 1907. Title to Tower Rock in Section 36 is unclear between 1902 and the early 1920s, but title reverted to the state some times in the early 1920s as school trust land.

=== Creation of the state park ===
The privately owned portion of Tower Rock was acquired by the Montana Department of Transportation (MDOT) in 1957 as part of the land acquisition of I-15 construction. But because the interstate passed east, rather than west, of Tower Rock, the new state land was never developed. MDOT later attempted to sell the land, but local residents successfully petitioned to have the sale canceled.

Tower Rock was added to the National Register of Historic Places on March 18, 2002. In 2003, a bill was introduced in the Montana Legislature prohibiting the state from selling Tower Rock and the surrounding acreage. Although the bill did not pass, MDOT officials paid heed to public sentiment and in February 2004 transferred ownership of the 140-acre (0.57 km^{2}) site enclosing Tower Rock to the Montana Department of Fish, Wildlife and Parks.

== About the state park ==
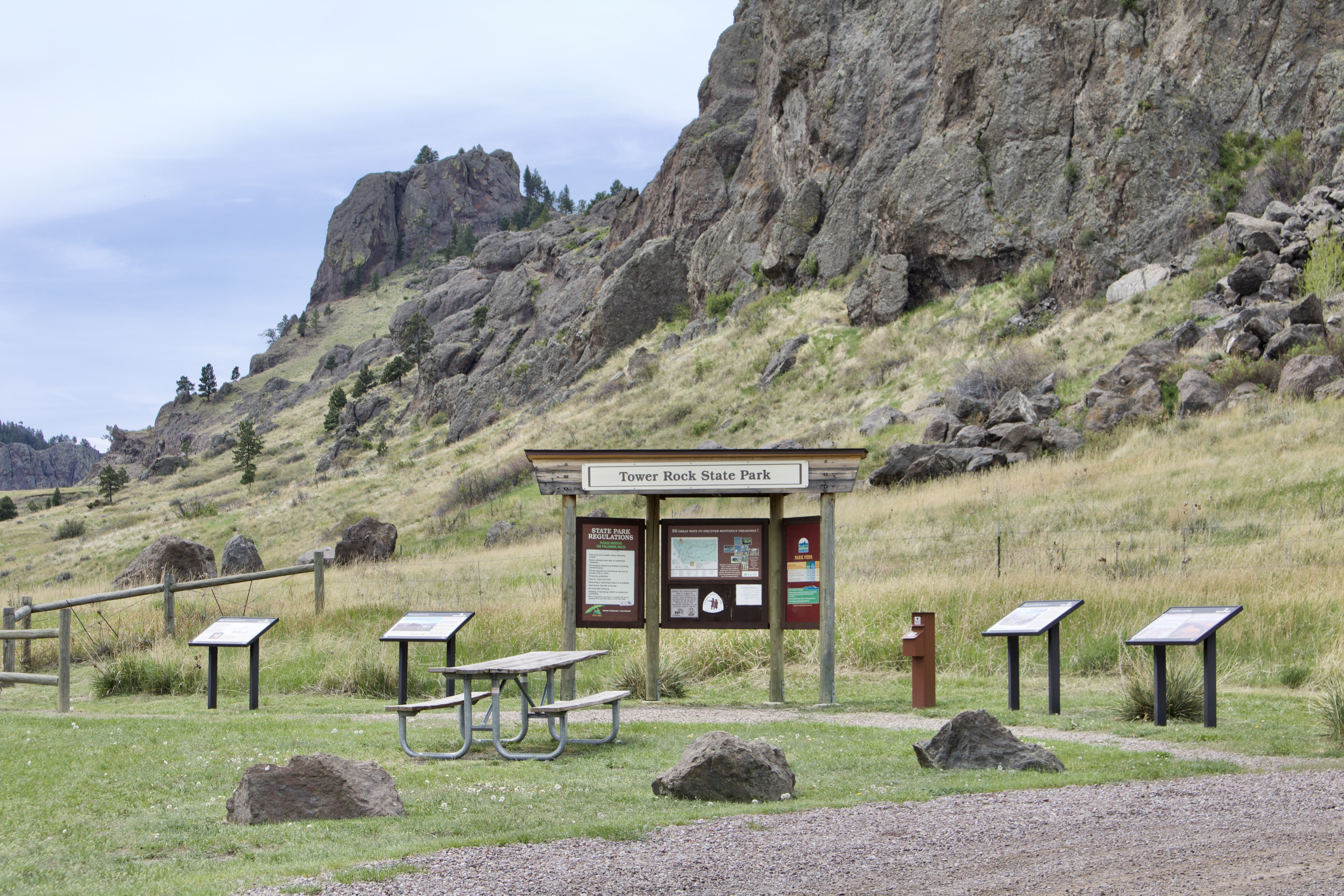
State park improved area with parking area at the beginning of hiking trail

Tower Rock State Park is located about 30 miles (48 km) south of the city of Great Falls in Cascade County, Montana. It may be accessed from interchange number 247 on Interstate 15. The state park is located at the mouth of the Missouri River Canyon, a 60-mile (97 km) long canyon that begins at Canyon Ferry Dam and ends at Tower Rock.

Tower Rock State Park has changed little from when Lewis and Clark first saw it in 1805. The site was unimproved when it was designated a state park in 2004, and remained undeveloped in 2006. By 2016, however, a parking lot and interpretative signage had been added at the north end of the site. A 0.25-mile (0.40 km) trail led from the parking lot toward the saddle between the two outcrops. Use of Tower Rock State Park is restricted to daylight hours only.

Tower Rock had 11,496 visitors in 2016, a 61 percent increase over the 2015 visitor level of 7,128.

== Bibliography ==
- Aarstad, Rich; Arguimbau, Ellen; Porsild, Charlene L.; Shovers, Brian (2009). Montana Place Names From Alzada to Zortman. Helena, Mont.: Montana Historical Society Press. ISBN 9780975919613.
- Alt, David D.; Hyndman, Donald W. (1986). Roadside Geology of Montana. Missoula, Mont.: Mountain Press Publishing. ISBN 9780878422029.
- Axline, Jon (1996). More From the Quarries of Last Chance Gulch. Helena, Mont.: Helena Independent Record. ISBN 9781560370888.
- Axline, Jon (2005). Conveniences Sorely Needed: Montana's Historic Highway Bridges, 1860-1956. Helena, Mont.: Montana Historical Society Press. ISBN 9780972152259.
- Axline, Jon (2015). Taming Big Sky Country: The History of Montana Transportation From Trails to Interstates. Charleston, S.C.: The History Press. ISBN 9781625853653.
- Axline, Jon; Bradshaw, Glenda Clay (2008). Montana's Historical Highway Markers. Helena, Mont.: Montana Historical Society Press. ISBN 9780975919644.
- Clawson, Roger; Shandera, Katherine A. (1998). Billings: The City and the People. Helena, Mont.: Farcountry Press. ISBN 9781560370376.
- Diffendal, R.F. Jr.; Diffendal, Anne P. (December 2003). Lewis and Clark and the Geology of the Great Plains. Educational Circular No. 17 (PDF) (Report). Lincoln, Neb.: Conservation and Survey Division, University of Nebraska-Lincoln.
- Gale, Kira (2006). Lewis and Clark Road Trips: Exploring the Trail Across America. Omaha, Neb.: River Junction Press. ISBN 9780964931527.
- Gunderson, Jay A.; Sheriff, Steven D. (January 10, 1991). "A New Late Cretaceous Paleomagnetic Pole from the Adel Mountains, West Central Montana". Journal of Geophysical Research. 96: 317–326. doi:10.1029/90jb01963.
- Harlan, Stephen S.; Geissman, John W.; Snee, Lawrence W.; Reynolds, Richard L. (June 1996). "Late Cretaceous Remagnetization of Proterozoic Mafic Dikes, Southern Highland Mountains, Southwestern Montana: A Paleomagnetic and 40Ar/39Ar Study". Geological Society of America Bulletin. 108 (6): 653–668. doi:10.1130/0016-7606(1996)108<0653:lcropm>2.3.co;2.
- Hearn, B. Carter Jr (2004). "The Homestead Kimberlite, Central Montana, USA: Mineralogy, Xenocrysts, and Upper-Mantle Xenoliths". In Stachel, T. (ed.). 8th International Kimberlite Conference: The J. Barry Hawthorn Volume. Vol. 2. Maryland Heights, Mo.: Gulf Professional Publishing. ISBN 9780444517753.
- Hidy, Ralph W.; Hidy, Muriel E.; Scott, Roy V. (2004). The Great Northern Railway: A History. Minneapolis: University of Minnesota Press. ISBN 9780816644292.
- Hyndman, Donald W.; Alt, David (November 1987). "Radial Dikes, Laccoliths and Gelatin Models". Journal of Geology. 95 (6): 763–774. doi:10.1086/629176. S2CID 128562770.
- Large, Arlen J. (2003). "The Leapfrogging Captains". In Saindon, Robert A. (ed.). Explorations Into the World of Lewis and Clark: 194 Essays From the Pages of 'We Proceeded On'. Great Falls, Mont.: Lewis and Clark Trail Heritage Foundation. ISBN 9781582187624.
- Lavender, David (2003). The Rockies. Lincoln, Neb.: University of Nebraska Press. ISBN 9780803280199.
- Leeson, Michael A. (1885). History of Montana, 1739-1885. Chicago: Warner, Beers & Co.
- Lewis, Meriwether; Clark, William (2002). Moulton, Gary E. (ed.). Over the Rockies to St. Louis: The Definitive Journals of Lewis & Clark. Volume 8. Lincoln, Neb.: University of Nebraska Press. ISBN 9780803280151.
- Lewis, Meriwether; Clark, William (1904). Thwaites, Reuben Gold (ed.). Original Journals of the Lewis and Clark Expedition, 1804-1806. Volume 2. New York: Dodd, Mead & Co.
- Lewis, Meriwether; Clark, William (1905). Thwaites, Reuben Gold (ed.). Original Journals of the Lewis and Clark Expedition, 1804-1806. Volume 5. New York: Dodd, Mead & Co.
- Lewis, Meriwether; Ordway, John (1916). Quaife, Milo M. (ed.). The Journals of Captain Meriwether Lewis and Sergeant John Ordway Kept on the Expedition of Western Exploration, 1803-1806. Madison, Wisc.: State Historical Society of Wisconsin.
- Lyons, J.B. (April 1944). "Igneous Rocks of the Northern Big Belt Range, Montana". Geological Society of America Bulletin. 55 (4): 445–472. doi:10.1130/gsab-55-445.
- Malone, Michael P.; Roeder, Richard B.; Lang, William L. (1991). Montana: A History of Two Centuries. Seattle: University of Washington Press. ISBN 9780295971209.
- Merrill-Maker, Andrea (2005). Montana Almanac. Guilford, Conn.: Globe Pequot. ISBN 9780762736553.
- National Park Service (March 18, 2002). Tower Rock. National Register of Historic Places Registration Form. NFS Form 10-900 (Rev. Oct. 1990) (Report). Washington, D.C.: United States Department of the Interior.
- Petersen, Keith (2014). John Mullan: The Tumultuous Life of a Western Road Builder. Pullman, Wash.: Washington State University Press. ISBN 9780874223217.
- Preston, Vernon (2006). Lewis & Clark: Weather and Climate Data From the Expedition Journals. Boston: American Meteorological Society. ISBN 9780933876996.
- Renz, Louis T. (1980). The History of the Northern Pacific Railroad. Fairfield, Wash.: Ye Galleon Press. ISBN 9780877702344.
- Schmidt, Robert George (1972). Geologic map of the Coburn Mountain quadrangle, Lewis and Clark and Cascade Counties, Montana. Quadrangle Map GQ-975 (Report). Washington, D.C.: U.S. Geological Survey.
- Sears, James W. (2007). "Belt-Purcell Basin: Keystone of the Rocky Mountain Fold-and-Thrust Belt, United States and Canada". In Sears, James W.; Harms, Tekla A.; Evenchick, C.A. (eds.). Whence the Mountains?: Inquiries Into the Evolution of Orogenic Systems: A Volume in Honor of Raymond A. Price. Boulder, Colo.: Geological Society of America. ISBN 9780813724331.
- Sheriff, Steven D.; Gunderson, Jay A. (December 1990). "Age of the Adel Mountain Volcanic Field, West-Central Montana" (PDF). Isochron/West: A Bulletin of Isotopic Geochronology: 21–23. Archived from the original on February 19, 2012.
- Sievert, Ellen; Sievert, Ken (1999). A Guide to Historic Lewistown. Helena, Mont.: Montana Historical Society Press. ISBN 9780917298592.
- Souder, Jon; Fairfax, Sally K. (1996). State Trust Lands: History, Management, and Sustainable Use. Lawrence, Kan.: University Press of Kansas. ISBN 9780700607310.
- Stevens, Isaac I. (1860). Reports of Explorations and Surveys to Ascertain the Most Practicable and Economical Route for a Railroad From the Mississippi River to the Pacific Ocean. Volume 12. Book I. Washington, D.C.: Thomas Ford, Printer.
- Tubbs, Stephenie Ambrose; Jenkinson, Clay Straus (2003). The Lewis and Clark Companion: An Encyclopedic Guide to the Voyage of Discovery. New York: Holt. ISBN 9780805067255.
- Woodger, Elin; Toropov, Brandon (2004). Encyclopedia of the Lewis and Clark Expedition. New York: Facts on File. ISBN 9781438110233.
