= Hardy, Montana =

- Census-designated place
- Location within Montana Location within the United States
- Coordinates: 47°10′50″N 111°49′02″W
- Country: United States
- State: Montana
- County: Cascade

Area
  - Total: 1.30 sq mi (3.36 km^{2})
  - Land: 1.13 sq mi (2.93 km^{2})
  - Water: 0.17 sq mi (0.43 km^{2})
- Elevation: 3,760 ft (1,150 m)

Population (2020)
  - Total: 88
  - Density: 77.8/sq mi (30.04/km^{2})
- Time zone: UTC-7 (Mountain (MST))
  - Summer (DST): UTC-6 (MDT)
- ZIP Code: 59421 (Cascade)
- Area code: 406
- FIPS code: 30-34300
- GNIS feature ID: 2804693

Hardy is an unincorporated community and census-designated place (CDP) in Cascade County, Montana, United States. It is in the southwest part of the county, in the valley of the Missouri River where it emerges from its canyon through the Adel Mountains Volcanic Field. Interstate 15 passes the community, with access from Exit 247. I-15 leads northeast 34 miles (55 km) to Great Falls and southwest 56 miles (90 km) to Helena.

The Hardy Bridge crosses the Missouri River in the southern part of the CDP, carrying the former route of U.S. Route 91. Tower Rock State Park is in the northern part of the CDP.

Hardy was first listed as a CDP prior to the 2020 census. As of the 2020 census, Hardy had a population of 88.

== Demographics ==
Historical population
Census	Pop.	Note	%±
2020	88		—
U.S. Decennial Census
