= Hardy Bridge =

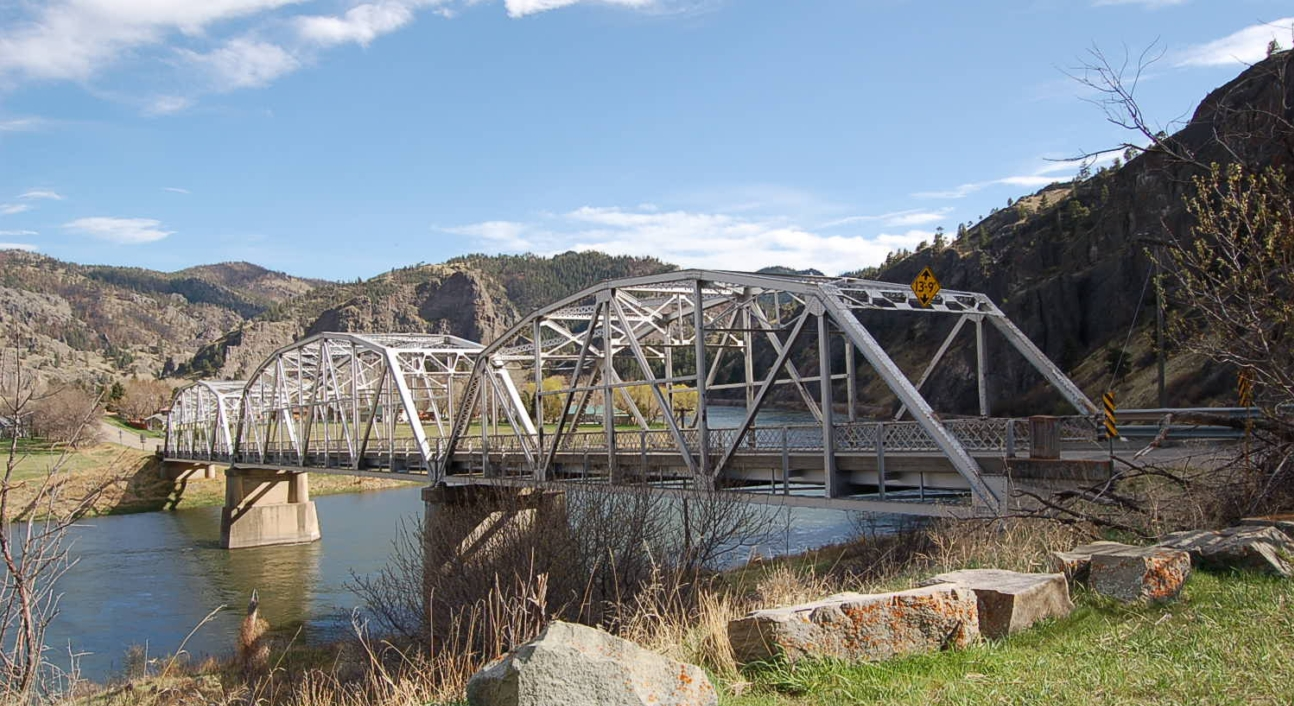
- Crosses the Missouri River
- Coordinates: 47.167°N 111.834°W
- Carries: Two (2) lanes of Old US 91
- Crosses: Missouri River
- Locale: Milepost 6, Old U.S. Route 91, 14 miles (23 km) southwest of Cascade, Montana, U.S.
- Maintained by: Montana Department of Transportation

Characteristics
- Design: Warren through truss
- Total length: 550 feet (170 m)
- Width: 21 feet (6.4 m)
- Longest span: 198 feet (60 m)
- Clearance below: 24 feet (7.3 m)

History
- Designer: Montana State Highway Commission
- Opened: 1931; 95 years ago

Statistics
- Daily traffic: 100 per day (estimated 2002)
- Toll: None

Location
- Interactive map of Hardy Bridge

- Hardy Bridge
- U.S. National Register of Historic Places
- Location within Montana Location within the United States
- Location: Milepost 6, Old U.S. Route 91, 14 miles (23 km) southwest of Cascade, Montana, U.S.
- Coordinates: 47.167°N 111.834°W
- Built: 1931, 95 years ago
- Architect: Montana State Highway Commission
- NRHP reference No.: 09001180
- Added to NRHP: January 4, 2010

Hardy Bridge is a Warren through truss, three-span, two-lane bridge in the western United States. It crosses the Missouri River and is located at milepost 6 on Old U.S. Route 91, about fourteen miles (23 km) southwest of Cascade, Montana, which is southwest of Great Falls.

Constructed 95 years ago in 1931, it was one of many similar bridges built during a great expansion of bridges and roadways in the state of Montana. It was added to the National Register of Historic Places on January 4, 2010.

Hardy Bridge is named for the unincorporated small community of Hardy, which is about two miles (3 km) downstream from the bridge below the Pine Island Rapids. The bridge is located on a northwest-southeast axis in the Adel Mountains Volcanic Field, a spectacularly eroded 75-million-year-old volcanic field; the approximate elevation of the river is 3,400 feet (1,035 m) above sea level.

== Description ==
The toll-free bridge is 550 feet (170 m) long and is 21 feet (6.4 m) wide. Two lanes of traffic (with a curb but no shoulder) are carried by the bridge. The two longest of its three spans are 198 feet (60.4 m) in length. The trusses are riveted steel, and the deck is cast-in-place concrete (with no membranes or weathering protection). The bridge has an overhead clearance of 14.2 feet (4.3 m). The bridge also spans the BNSF Railway tracks on its northwestern approaches, where the clearance is 24 feet (7.3 m).

The trusses are the defining feature of the bridge. Two 198-foot (60 m) through-trusses with eight panels on each side and one 120-foot (37 m) through-truss with six panels on each side form the body of the bridge. The arc of the truss consists of steel beams connected to one another by "batten plates" (single-piece, flat, cast steel plates). The chords (the vertical and sloping beams) fit within a flange (a U-shaped, single-piece, cast steel plate) which is battened to the arc of the truss. The portal braces (the criss-crossing small beams that form a box hanging from the "roof" of the truss) are fastened to the truss with gusset plates. The horizontal struts at the top of each portal brace is made of "laced" steel (beams with holes in it), since the struts are in tension (being pulled apart) rather than compression (crushed from the ends). This allows them to be lighter and save weight. The sway braces (criss-crossing beams perpendicular to the portal braces) are attached to the truss with gusset plates, and bolted to one another at midpoint. In the deck, the 19 long floor I-beams are held together by five "stringer" I-beams. The deck itself is a single concrete slab, cast in place.

Three reinforced concrete piers support the bridge. The piers at either end are on land, while the central pier is in the river. The central pier has a base that is solid concrete. The approach span in the southeast is supported by a reinforced concrete T-beam, and the deck is supported by concrete girders.

The bridge carried about 100 vehicles per day in 2002, of which about 3 percent were heavy trucks. No increase in traffic is expected between 2010 and 2026.

The last inspection was in September 2010. At that time, state bridge inspectors found the deck to be in fair condition. The superstructure and substructure were both in satisfactory condition, with only minor deterioration. With no appreciable river traffic in this area, there were no pier protections. There was only minimal scouring of the riverbed around the piers, and minor bank erosion around the approaches.

== History ==
=== Early highways ===
In the summer of 1860, U.S. Army Lieutenant John Mullan and his party of scouts, surveyors, and trail blazers finished construction on the Mullan Road, the first route to connect Fort Benton, Montana, with Fort Walla Walla, Washington. North of Helena, the Mullan Road passed through Prickly Pear Canyon in the northwestern tip of the Big Belt Mountains. After it exited the canyon, the road went north across the prairie rather than follow the Missouri River through the Adel Mountains Volcanic Field. In 1865, the Montana Territorial Legislature gave the Little Prickly Pear Wagon Road Company the right to build a toll road along the path of the Mullan Road through Prickly Pear Canyon, and from there along the Missouri River through the river's canyon in the Adel Mountains Volcanic Field to Great Falls and then Fort Benton. The following year, Helena businessmen James King and Warren Gillette purchase the road from the Little Prickly Pear Wagon Road Company. They made $40,000 in improvements (a huge sum at the time), and traffic on the new "Benton Road" boomed.

The Montana Central Railway, which began operation between Great Falls and Helena in November 1887, largely followed the path of the Benton Road through both the Adel and Big Belt mountains. James J. Hill, primary stockholder and president of the St. Paul, Minneapolis & Manitoba Railway (StPM&M), established the Montana Central Railway on January 25, 1886. Few railroads served Montana at that time. But Butte, Montana, was a booming mining town that needed to get its metals to market; Helena was competing to be the state capitol (and would win that fight in 1875); and coal companies in Canada were eager to get their fuel to Montana's smelters. Hill had already decided to build the StPM&M across the northern tier of Montana, and it made sense to build a north-south railroad through central Montana to connect Great Falls with Helena and Butte. Because the Benton Road already laid out a route, surveyors and engineers began grading the line between Helena and Great Falls in the winter of 1885-1886 (even before the company had been incorporated). By the end of 1886, they had surveyed a route from Helena to Butte. Construction on the Great Northern's northern Montana line began in late 1886, and on October 16, 1887, the link between Devils Lake, North Dakota; Fort Assinniboine (near the present-day city of Havre); and Great Falls was complete. Service to Helena began in November 1887, and service to Butte followed on November 10, 1888.

Shortly after the railroad was completed, Cascade County constructed an unpaved county road alongside the Montana Central Railway. This county road crossed the railway tracks in numerous places, At Hardy, Cascade County constructed a timber bridge across the Missouri River.

=== U.S. Route 91 upgrade ===
With the development of the Ford Model T in 1908, automobiles became affordable for the average American citizen. But few paved roads or highways existed, as long-distance overland travel was done by railroad and local transportation was horse-drawn. In the early 1910s, the National Park Service conceived of building a paved highway between Yellowstone National Park and Glacier National Park as a means of encouraging tourism in both parks. It helped establish "citizens associations" in both parks to lobby for state and federal funds for road construction. At first, the lack of a national transportation policy hindered these efforts. Later, World War I diverted funds and material to war use. In 1919, however, the first Geysers-to-Glaciers Highway opened. This two-lane highway followed what is now US 89 W from the Yellowstone border to Livingston, and then followed U.S. Route 191/Interstate 90 west through Bozeman to Three Forks. It then went north along what is now U.S. Route 287/Interstate 15 until it reached Exit 228, at which point it continued to follow the old Mullan Road route along U.S. Route 287 and Montana Highway 200 to Great Falls. From Great Falls, it continued north on what is now Interstate 15 to Shelby, then went west along current U.S. Route 2 from Shelby to Cut Bank. At that point, it went north along the Glacier National Park border, following current MT 213 from Cut Bank to the Canada–U.S. border. In 1920, a shorter eastern route known as the Yellowstone-Glacier Beeline Highway opened. The "Y-G Beeline" continued to follow U.S. Route 89 from Livington, until it reached Great Falls. It rejoined the Geysers-to-Glaciers Highway thereafter.

Beginning in 1924, the American Association of State Highway Officials (AASHO) began an effort to number America's "auto trails" such as the Geysers-to-Glaciers Highway. A numbering system was proposed in 1925, and the Secretary of Agriculture (who had supervision over federal highway naming at the time) approved the system on November 18, 1925. The Geysers-to-Glaciers Highway from Great Falls to Helena was now the northern terminus of U.S. Route 91—a transnational highway that extended into Idaho, Utah, Arizona, Nevada, and California, and terminated at Long Beach, California.

The state of Montana's roads and bridges were considered abysmal in the early 1920s, even by the low standards of the day. Throughout the decade, the state began a program of road improvements and bridge building that constructed more than 400 masonry, iron, or steel bridges in the state by 1930. As a cost-saving measure, the State Highway Commission (now the Montana Department of Transportation) had already adopted a uniform riveted steel Warren through truss design in 1915. Throughout the 1920s, both steel and timber bridges were constructed. Almost 1,000 timber bridges, designed to bridge small creeks or coulees, were built. Roughly an additional 170 bridges were made of masonry, iron, or steel.

With the onset of the Great Depression in October 1929, the State Highway Commission needed to cut back on the expense of the more advanced bridges. It simplified the design of its steel truss and steel girder bridges, so they would cost less and take less time to build (reducing labor costs). Construction of these types of bridges was limited, however, by access to aggregate and water for cement, a lack of contractors capable of building such bridges, and a small skilled workforce trained in building with cement and steel.

=== Bridge construction ===
Construction of the Hardy Bridge was prompted by a major change in U.S. Route 91. In the late 1920s, the federal government and Montana state legislature agreed to realign U.S. Route 91. The goal was to create a shorter route by continuing north along the Missouri River through picturesque Wolf Creek Canyon, bypassing the long drive through the prairie and along the Sun River. The county road built in the late 1800s would be widened and paved, and become the new U.S. Route 91. Most of the new U.S. Route 91 through Wolf Creek Canyon was paid for with federal highway money sped to the states as an anti-depression measure. Although a few contracts for road construction were awarded in 1929, most of the contracts were let in 1930 and 1931. The route was complete by 1935.

Constructing a new bridge at Hardy was one of the most important elements of the new U.S. Route 91 alignment. Funding for the structure came entirely from the state of Montana. No federal funds were expended.

Although the design of the Hardy Bridge extended back to 1915, the bridge was constructed with the most up-to-date tools and materials available. The construction contract was awarded on July 16, 1930, to the Great Falls construction firm of McGuire and Blakeslee. The firm was one of the few contractors in the state which had the expertise, workforce, and experience in building either with reinforced concrete or with steel. Evarts Haskins Blakesless was born in Lake Geneva, Wisconsin, on May 28, 1884. He obtained a degree in engineering from the University of Wisconsin in 1907 and moved to Montana, where he worked on irrigation projects. In 1917, he was employed by the State Highway Commission, and built roads and bridges in the state until 1921 when he resigned to become an independent contractor. Angus McGuire was a Scot who emigrated to the U.S. some time prior to 1910. He met Blakeslee in the Bitterroot Valley during the 1910s. McGuire partnered with Blakeslee in the new construction firm and moved to Great Falls in 1921.

McGuire and Blakeslee bid $112,993 to construct the bridge. Structural steel was purchased from the Minneapolis-Moline Power Implement Company, cement from the Ideal Cement Company, and reinforcing steel from the Carnegie Steel Company. The Great Northern Railway, which owned the Montana Central Railway, paid $6,750 to have the bridge span its tracks rather than create a grade crossing. of the span crossing its tracks. The bridge was finished and opened in 1931.

=== Later history ===
In 1941, the United States Department of War instructed the Montana State Highway Commission to designate highways critical to defense. The state determined that U.S. Route 10, U.S. Route 87, and U.S. Route 91 were the critical routes. During World War II, U.S. Route 91 and the Hardy Bridge provided a critical connection between copper mines in Butte and the Anaconda Copper refinery and Malmstrom Air Force Base in Great Falls.

Eager to replicate the autobahn system of superhighways which Nazi Germany had constructed in the 1930s (and which proved critical to its war effort), the Public Road Administration (now known as the Federal Highway Administration) proposed a system of "interstate defense highways" in 1947. The agency's map of defense highways was based on the critical-needs designation of World War II. Nothing came of this proposal until 1956, when President Dwight Eisenhower signed the Federal Aid Highway Act of 1956 into law. This legislation largely implement the federal government's 1947 call for a system of ultra-modern, fast, easily accessed superhighways across the nation. The legislation authorized the expenditure of $25 billion to construct these "interstate highways" from 1957 to 1969. Interstate 15's alignment north of Helena generated controversy, but an alignment along U.S. Route 91 was decided. One of the first contracts issued for a section of interstate was for the Ulm-to-Cascade section just north of Wolf Creek Canyon. The section through Wolf Creek Canyon was completed by the mid-1960s. (The state's first interstate rest area was completed in Wolf Creek Canyon in 1963.) Most of U.S. Route 91 was removed during the construction of Interstate 91, although small portions through Wolf Creek Canyon continue to exist as frontage roads or local county roads. Construction of Interstate 15 bypassed the Hardy Bridge, leaving the structure little-used.

As of 2009, Hardy Bridge was still at its original site. The area around the bridge has seen littled residential construction, and the bridge's original structural components remained intact.

== Historical significance ==
The Hardy Bridge was one of the last of its kind built in Montana until the late 1940s. The worsening Great Depression put a new focus on cost-cutting and building bridges which could utilize more unskilled workers. Shortly after the Hardy Bridge was finished, state highway engineers abandoned through truss and reinforced concrete bridges except for the widest river crossings, and switched to steel girder and steel stringer (multiple girder) bridges. From 1930 to May 1933, less than 1 percent of bridges built in the state were steel through truss bridges. After construction of the Hardy Bridge, the state switched its standard design to continuous truss bridges.

The Hardy Bridge was also one of the last bridges built in Montana solely with state money. Although the Hoover administration was ideologically opposed to deficit spending and using federal money for welfare and relief, it did agree to both increase the amount of money being spent on infrastructure projects (such as bridges) as well as the rate at which this money was spent. Subsequently, Congress passed a major infrastructure bill, the "Authorization and Amendment to the Federal Highway Act of April 4, 1930", which increased to $125 million from $75 million the amount of money appropriated for bridge building for fiscal 1931 (which began July 1, 1930). Additionally, Congress passed legislation in early 1931 which would allow fiscal 1932 bridge-building dollars to be disbursed in December 1931 rather than spread throughout the fiscal year.

== In popular culture ==
Hardy Bridge was a prominent feature in the 1987 film The Untouchables, starring Kevin Costner and Sean Connery; it served as a U.S.-Canada border crossing.

Motion picture star Gary Cooper was raised on the Seven Bar Nine Ranch, which was located near the site where Hardy Bridge now stands.

== Gallery ==
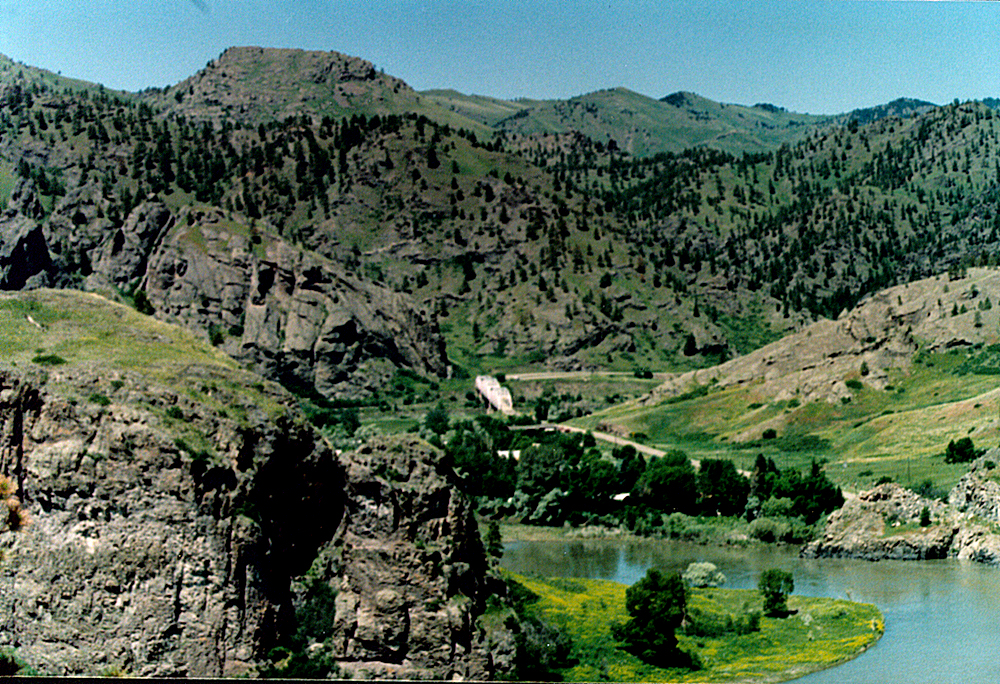
The Hardy Bridge is located in the spectacular Adel Mountains Volcanic Field.

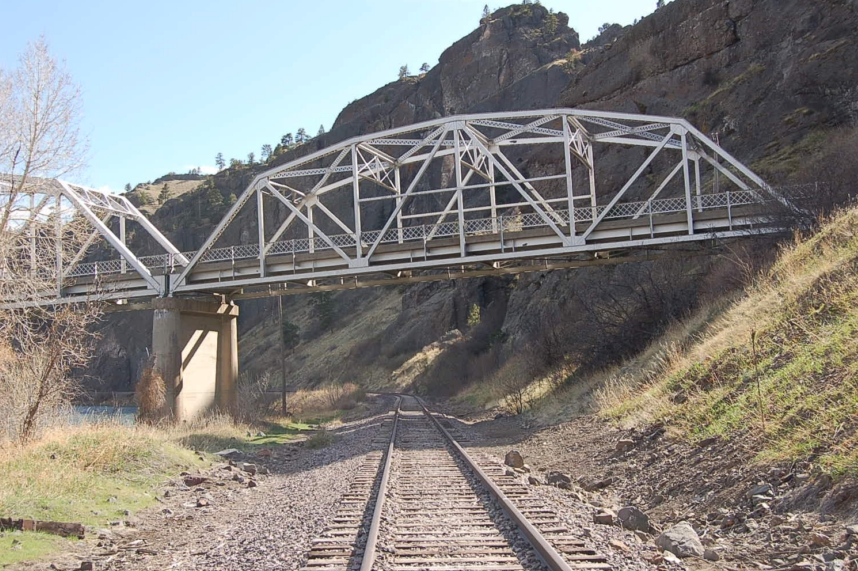
The north end of the Hardy Bridge passes over the BNSF Railway tracks.

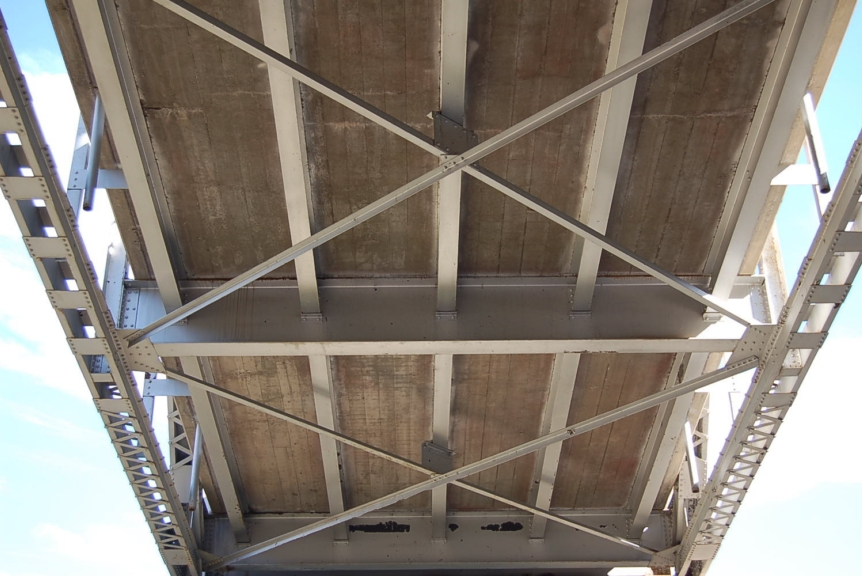
The simple substructure of the Hardy Bridge shows the cast-in-place concrete deck

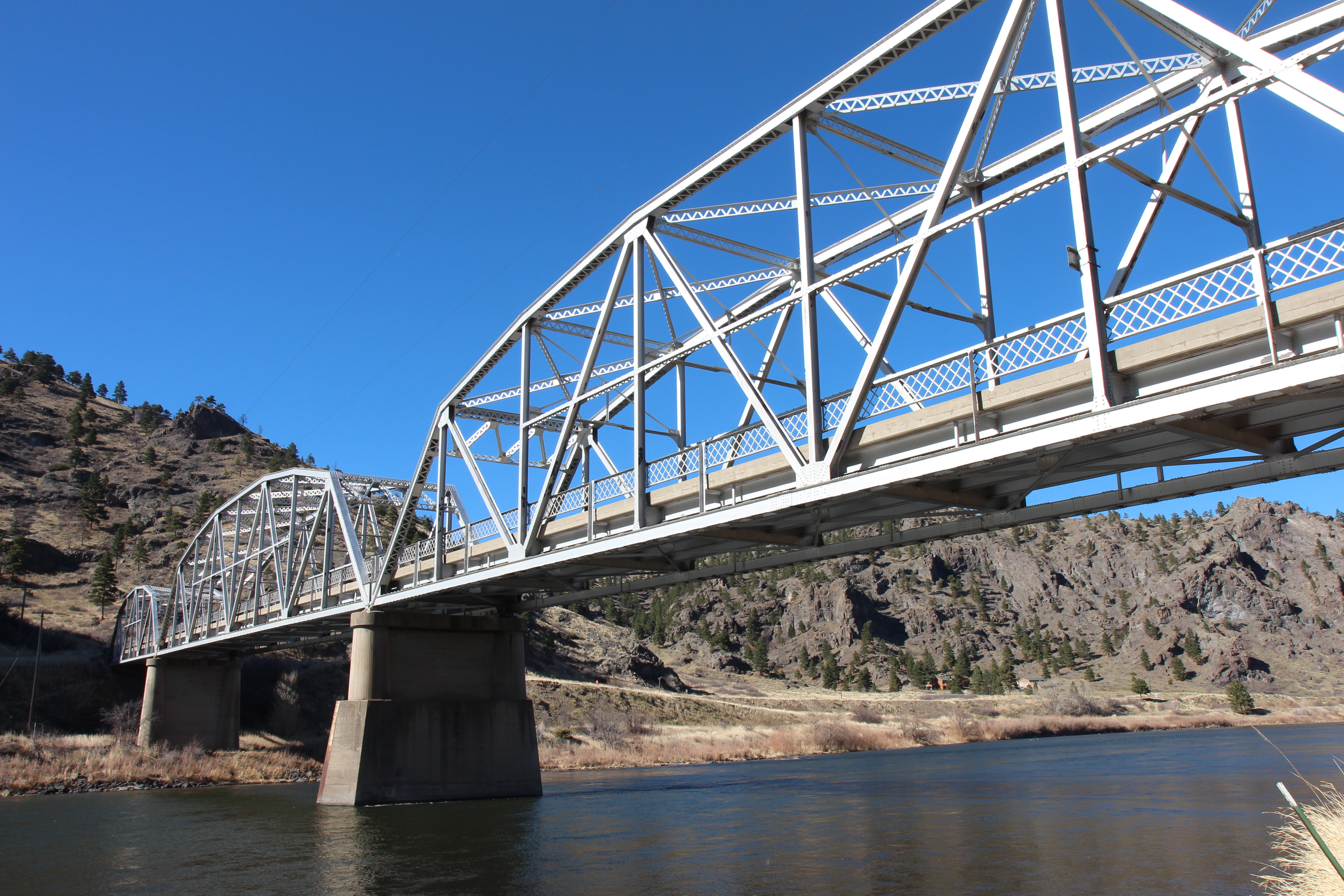
Hardy Bridge is a three-span, two-lane bridge over the Missouri River in Montana.

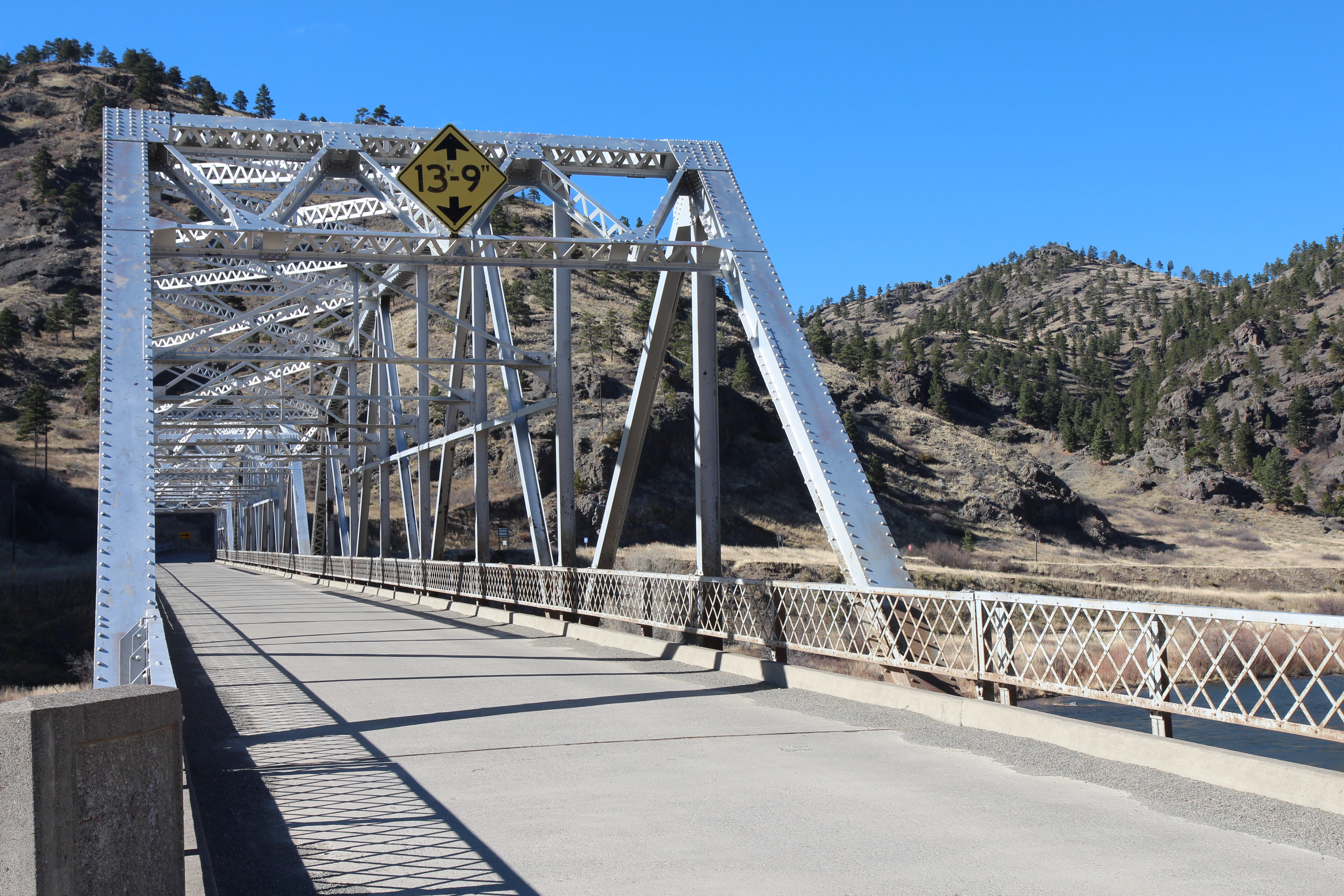
Hardy Bridge is a three-span, two-lane bridge over the Missouri River in Montana.

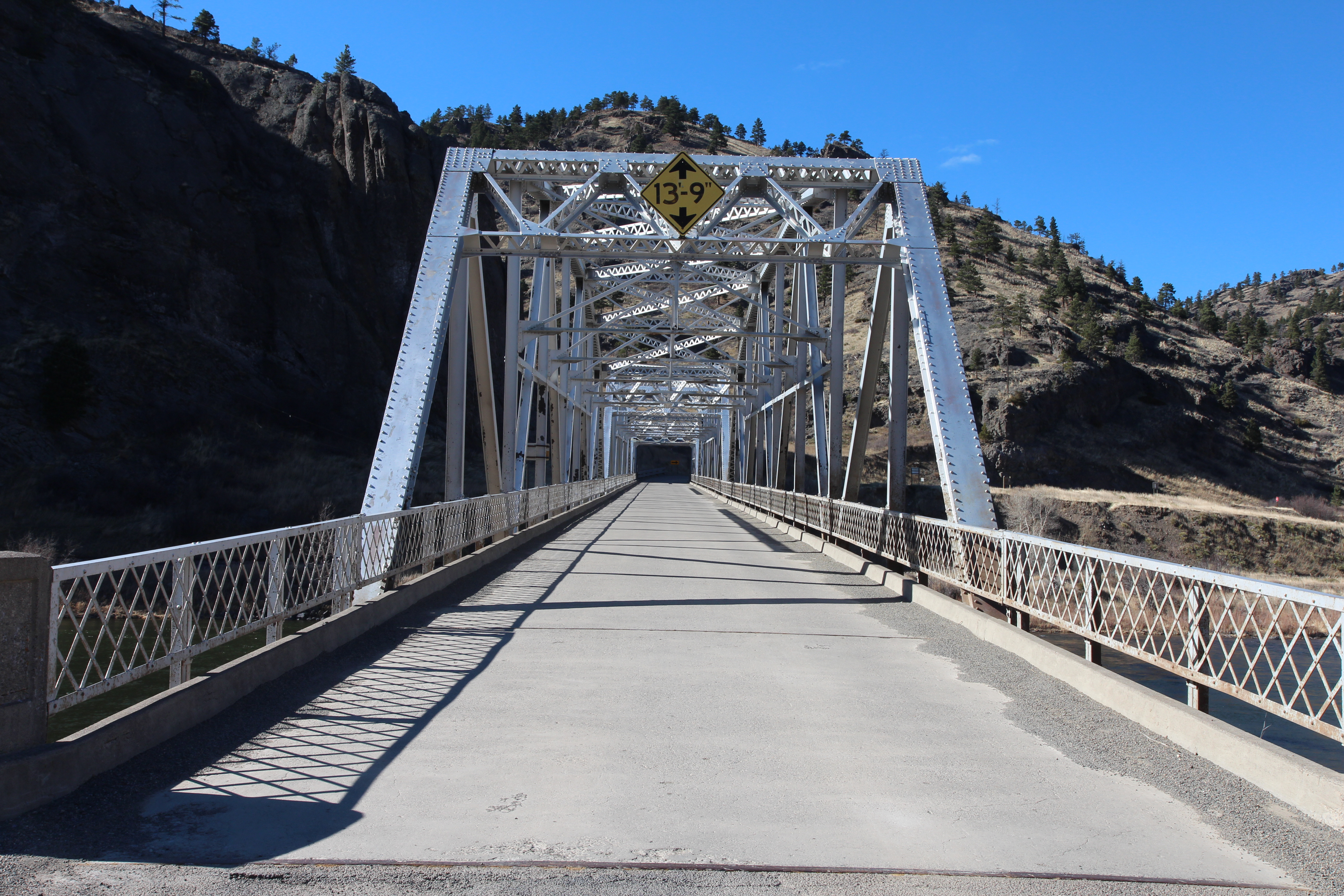
Hardy Bridge is a three-span, two-lane bridge over the Missouri River in Montana.

== Notes ==
=== Bibliography ===
- Axline, Jon. Conveniences Sorely Needed: Montana's Historic Highway Bridges, 1860-1956. Helena, Mont.: Montana Historical Society Press, 2005.
- Baranowski, Shelley and Furlough, Ellen. Being Elsewhere: Tourism, Consumer Culture, and Identity in Modern Europe and North America. Ann Arbor, Mich.: University of Michigan Press, 2001.
- Barth, Jack. Roadside Hollywood: The Movie Lover's State-By-State Guide to Film Locations, Celebrity Hangouts, Celluloid Tourist Attractions, and More. Chicago: Contemporary Books, 1991.
- Eastman, John. Who Lived Where: A Biographical Guide to Homes and Museums. New York: Facts on File Publications, 1985.
- Fletcher, Robert H.; Bradshaw, Glenda Clay; Axline, Jon; and Shope, Irvin. Montana's Historical Highway Markers. Helena, Mont.: Montana Historical Society Press, 2008.
- Hidy, Ralph W.; Hidy, Muriel E.; and Scott, Roy V. The Great Northern Railway: A History. Minneapolis: University of Minnesota Press, 2004.
- Mullan, John. Military Road From Fort Benton to Fort Walla-Walla. U.S. Army. Corps of Topographical Engineers. Washington, D.C.: Government Printing Office, 1861.
- National Park Service. Rules and Regulations. Yellowstone National Park, 1920. Season June 20 to September 15. U.S. Department of the Interior. Washington, D.C.: Government Printing Office, 1920. Accessed 2013-01-23.
- Official Automobile Blue Book. Chicago: Automobile Blue Books, 1923.
- Parish, James Robert; Stanke, Don E.; and Pitts, Michael R. The All-Americans. New York: Arlington House, 1977.
- Reports of the Department of the Interior for the Fiscal Year Ended June 30, 1919. Volume 1. Washington, D.C.: Government Printing Office, 1919.
