= Harris Mountain Fire =

2021 wildfire in Montana

- Date: July 23, 2021 – Present
- Location: Cascade, Montana
- Coordinates: 47.127°N 111.75°W

Statistics
- Burned area: 31,460 acres (12,731 ha)

Ignition
- Cause: Lightning

Map
- Location in Western Montana

The Harris Mountain Fire is a wildfire that started near Cascade, Montana on July 16, 2021. The fire has burned 31,460 acres (12,731 ha) and is 20% contained.

== Events ==
=== July ===
The Harris Mountain Fire was first reported on July 23, 2021, at around 12:00 pm MST.

=== Cause ===
The cause of the fire is believed to be due to lightning.

=== Containment ===
As of August 5, 2021, the Harris Mountain Fire is 20% contained.
