= Tower Rock (disambiguation) =

Tower Rock is a landmark island in the Mississippi River, in Perry County, Missouri.

Tower Rock may also refer to:

- Tower Rock State Park, in Cascade County, Montana
- A rock formation near Chillagoe, Queensland, Australia
- A rock formation on the Cispus River in Washington
