= Shonkin Sag =

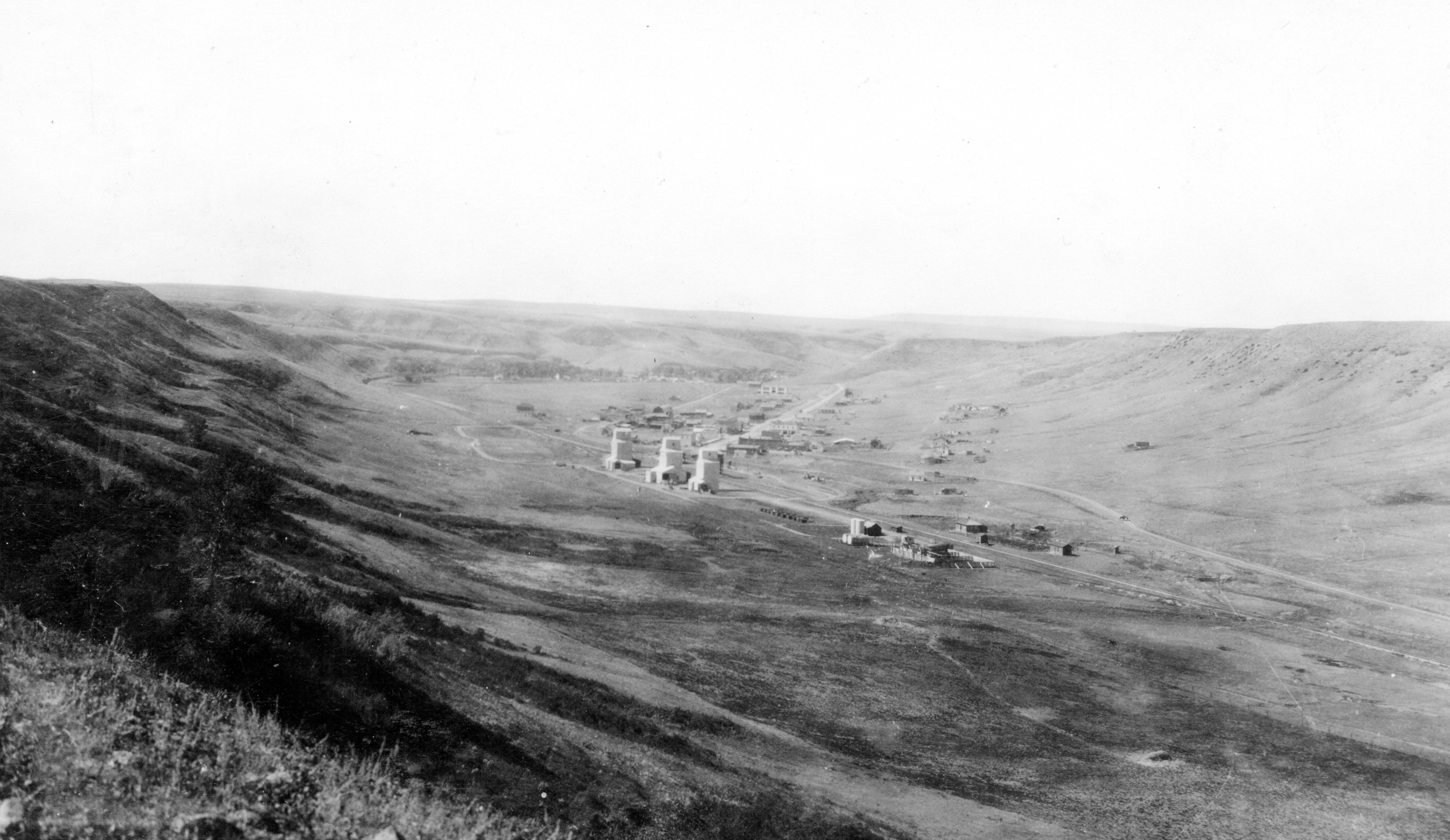
A portion of the Shonkin Sag near Highwood, Montana, in 1920.

The Shonkin Sag is a prehistoric fluvioglacial landform located along the northern edge of the Highwood Mountains in the state of Montana in the United States. The Sag is a river channel formed by the Missouri River and glacial meltwater pouring from Glacial Lake Great Falls. It is one of the most famous prehistoric meltwater channels in the world.

== Location and size ==
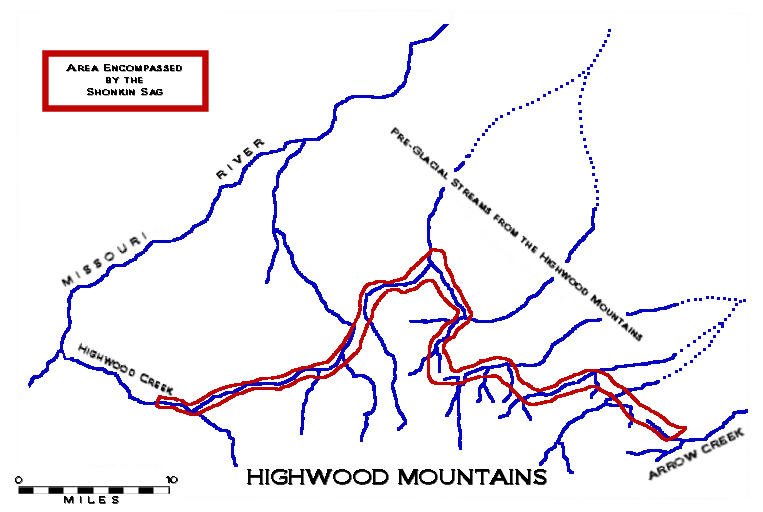
Map of a portion of the Shonkin Sag (outlined in red) near Highwood, Montana.

Shonkin Sag is located in central Montana. It begins south of Highwood, Montana, (about 23 miles (37 km) east of the city of Great Falls) and runs in an easterly direction for about 100 miles (160 km) until it reaches the Judith River. It varies from 0.25 miles (0.40 km) to 2 miles (3.2 km) in width and is about 500 feet (150 m) deep. Its midpoint is located at approximately 47.591948°N 110.68943°W. Shallow glacial lakes may still be found along the now-dry channel.

The sag is named for the town of Shonkin, Montana, settled in the 1870s. The name "Shonkin" is allegedly the Blackfeet word for the Highwood Mountains, or an adulteration of one of the town's early settlers, John Shonk.

== Formation ==
Prior to the Quaternary glaciation, the Missouri River drained to the northeast into a terminal lake or Hudson Bay. During the last glacial period about 17,000 to 13,000 years ago, the Laurentide Ice Sheet blocked the Missouri River and created Glacial Lake Great Falls.

According to geologist Fred H.H. Calhoun and others, the ice sheet forced the waters of Glacial Lake Great Falls to reach at least 3,900 feet (1,200 m) above sea level. About 15,000 years ago, a glacial lake outburst flood occurred. These waters and their attendant debris then carved the Shonkin Sag at right angles across the existing drainage valleys, with the ice sheet forming the northern edge of the channel. Once the ice sheet retreated, the Shonkin Sag continued to provide a channel for water draining from Glacial Lake Great Falls and the Missouri River, albeit at a much slower rate and at a lower level.

== Laccolith ==
The Shonkin Sag lends its name to the Shonkin Sag laccolith, a famous laccolith 200 feet (61 m) thick and 1 mile (1.6 km) wide near the western mouth of the Shonkin Sag. A laccolith is an igneous intrusion injected between two layers of sedimentary rock. Significant amounts of syenite and shonkinite can be found in the laccolith. The Shonkin Sag laccolith is cited by geologists as a classic example of igneous differentiation in a single igneous intrusion.

== Railroad grade ==
Part of the North Montana line of the Chicago, Milwaukee, St. Paul and Pacific Railroad was constructed within Shonkin Sag (see photo above).
