= Steamboat Williams =

American baseball player (1892–1979)

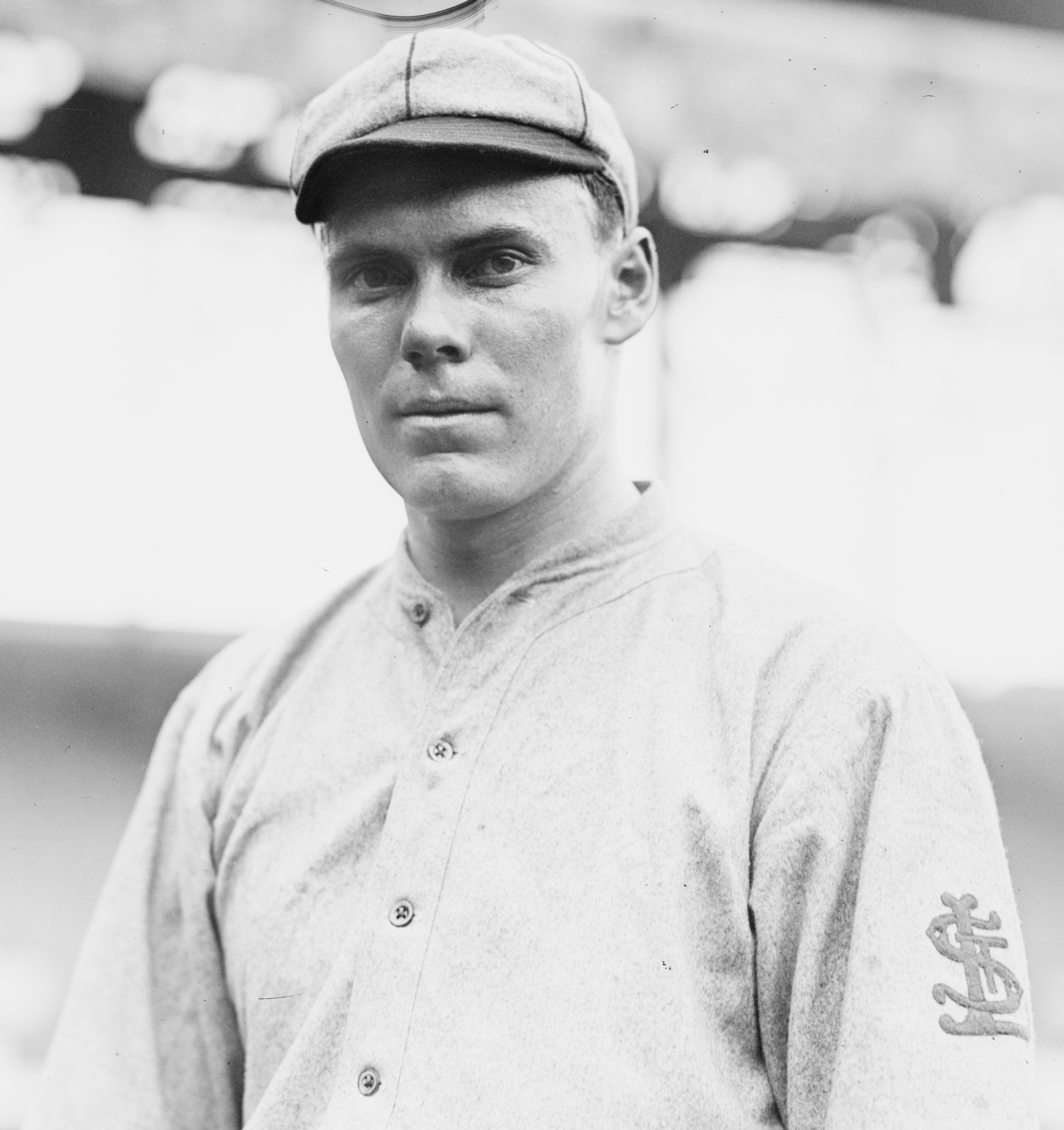
- Williams in 1916
- Pitcher
- Born: January 31, 1892; Cascade, Montana, U.S.
- Died: June 29, 1979 (aged 87); Deer River, Minnesota, U.S.
- Batted: Left Threw: Right

MLB debut
- July 12, 1914, for the St. Louis Cardinals

Last MLB appearance
- October 1, 1916, for the St. Louis Cardinals

MLB statistics
- Win–loss record: 6–8
- Earned run average: 4.42
- Strikeouts: 27
- Stats at Baseball Reference

Teams
- St. Louis Cardinals (1914, 1916)

Rees Gephardt "Steamboat" Williams (January 31, 1892 – June 29, 1979) was a baseball player for the 1914 and 1916 St. Louis Cardinals.

Williams was born in Cascade, Montana, and was the first Montana-born player in Major League Baseball history. He batted left-handed and threw right-handed. He was 5 ft 11 in (1.80 m) tall and weighed 170 pounds (77 kg). He died in Deer River, Minnesota.
