= Adel Mountains Volcanic Field =

Volcanic field in Montana, United States

Coordinates: 47°04′34″N 111°42′24″W

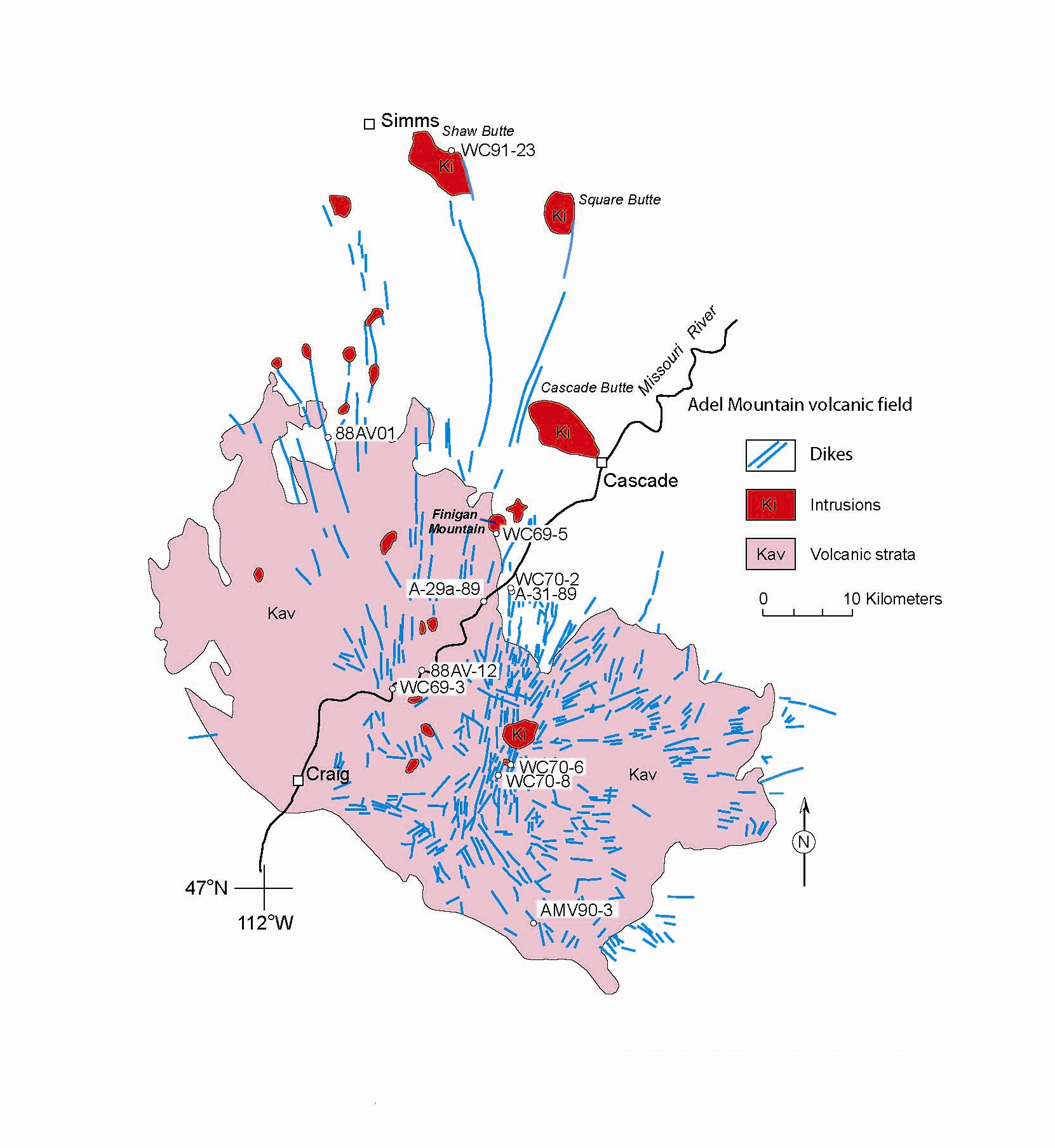
Simplified geologic map of the Adel Mountain volcanic field.

The Adel Mountains Volcanic Field (also known as the Adel Mountains, Adel Volcanics, and Adel Mountain Volcanics) is an ancient volcanic field of heavily eroded 75-million-year-old igneous rocks about 40 miles long and 20 miles wide (800 square miles, or 2,071 square kilometers) in west-central Montana about 30 miles southwest of the city of Great Falls. The area was named by geologist John Bartholomew Lyons, who first described the general geology of the region in 1944. The Adel Mountains Volcanic Field is a significant and abundant source of shonkinite, a very uncommon type of intrusive igneous rock found primarily in Montana, Ontario, and Timor. Because of its geologic structure, the Adel Mountains Volcanic Field has drawn the attention of geologists for more than 100 years.

== Description ==
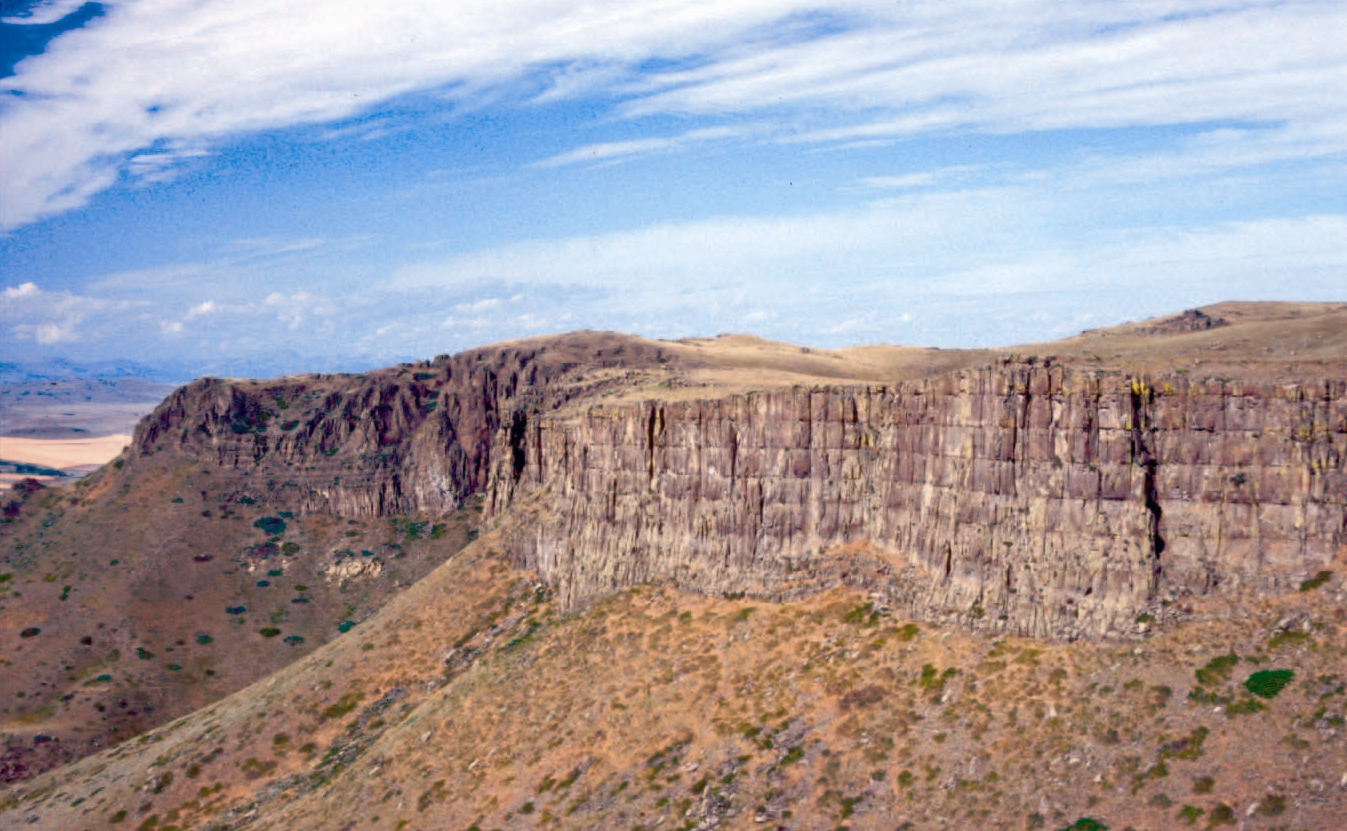
Northwest view of Square Butte, a laccolith in the Adel Mountains Volcanic Field.

The Adel Mountains Volcanic Field is a 3,280-foot (1,000 m) thick unit which lies unconformably on top of Cretaceous sedimentary rock of the Two Medicine Formation on the edge of the Great Falls Tectonic Zone. The extrusive rock is composed of breccia and conglomerate. The intrusive rock has formed numerous dikes, sills, and plugs. An "enormous number of dikes...emanate radially from its center", many of which are visually striking and vertical, and can be seen from the interstate highway and other roads in the area. Many of the dikes clearly fed laccoliths in the area. Two concentric rings of laccoliths lie in the northwest section of the field 11 miles (18 km) and 14 miles (23 km) from the center of the area. Square Butte, Shaw Butte (near the town of Ft. Shaw), and Cascade Butte (next to the town of Cascade) are three laccoliths belonging to the Adel field which are famous local landmarks. More than 2,000 feet (610 m) of rock which used to exist on top of Square Butte has subsequently eroded to reveal the igneous rock which forms the laccolith. Each laccolith was fed by a radial dike at its distal end where it rolled over from vertical to form the horizontal laccolith. Laccoliths spread from the end of their feeder dike towards the more-elongate axis of the parent volcano, in response to load-imposed stresses of the volcano.

Adel Mountain is the highest peak in the volcanic field, at 7,093 feet (2,162 m) above sea level, and an unnamed peak in the field is the second-highest at 6,845 feet (2,086 m) above sea level.

== Formation ==
The age of the Adel Mountain Volcanic Field has been re-estimated several times since 1944. Based on fossil evidence, Lyons estimated in 1944 that the formation was late Cretaceous in origin, making it about 66 million years old. This estimate was reinforced in the early 1970s. But separate analyses made in 1991 and 2004 re-estimated the rock as having formed in the late Cretaceous, about 81 to 71 million years ago. Most estimates today place the age at 75 million years. The Adel volcanics are part of the Laramide orogeny, a period of mountain building in western North America which began about 80 million years ago and ended about 35 million years ago. The age of the volcanism and thrusting overlap, with some intrusions being affected by the thrusting while others were intruded into already formed thrust horses.

Magma welled up from below for several million years, creating the Adel volcanics as well as the nearby Highwood Mountains and Judith Mountains. The crustal weakness associated with the Great Falls Tectonic Zone may have provided a route for the magma to reach the surface. Magma which never made it to the surface nonetheless created the many dikes, sills, plugs, and laccoliths which can be seen in the Adel volcanic field.

Scientists have studied the Adel Mountains Volcanic Field for a number of reasons. Several teams of scientists have analyzed the polar wander path to study continental drift. Others have looked at the possibility of petroleum or other hydrocarbons under the field, and concluded there is a strong possibility they exist there.

== Development of the area ==
Although not permanently inhabited by Native Americans, several tribes camped in the Adel Mountains Volcanic Field on their way to and from bison hunting rounds on the nearby plains (such as the pishkun, or buffalo jump, at nearby Ulm—the largest in the world). The Lewis and Clark Expedition passed up the Missouri River through the area in July 1805, becoming the first white Americans to see the formations.

Development of the area did not come until the 1930s. Cattle ranchers were the area's first white settlers. The primary route over the Rocky Mountains to the Pacific Ocean, the Mullan Road, skirted the volcanic field to the north, although dirt stagecoach roads were built into the Missouri River Canyon in the volcanic field in the 1860s. The road was upgraded and turned into a toll road in 1866, and had become a major route from Helena through Great Falls to Fort Benton by the 1870s. The Montana Central Railway reached the region in 1887, which led to additional white settlement. A paved county road was laid down, and remained the sole access through the area for decades. In the 1920s, the Montana Highway Department began planning a major highway through the area as part of their effort to build U.S. Highway 91 and provide a direct road connection between Helena and Great Falls. Contracts were let in 1929, the majority of construction occurred from 1931 to 1934, and the highway was completed in 1935. The Hardy Bridge, built over the Missouri River in 1931, was one of two major bridges built for Highway 91. Interstate 15 was built largely on top of U.S. Highway 91 in 1967.

== Climate ==
Climate data for Adel, Montana, 1991–2020 normals, extremes 1898–present
Month	Jan	Feb	Mar	Apr	May	Jun	Jul	Aug	Sep	Oct	Nov	Dec	Year
Record high °F (°C)	64 (18)	66 (19)	74 (23)	84 (29)	91 (33)	99 (37)	106 (41)	101 (38)	96 (36)	88 (31)	75 (24)	67 (19)	106 (41)
Mean maximum °F (°C)	55.2 (12.9)	54.6 (12.6)	63.2 (17.3)	71.9 (22.2)	79.0 (26.1)	85.0 (29.4)	91.7 (33.2)	91.9 (33.3)	87.0 (30.6)	76.6 (24.8)	62.3 (16.8)	52.3 (11.3)	93.7 (34.3)
Mean daily maximum °F (°C)	36.3 (2.4)	37.5 (3.1)	44.6 (7.0)	52.6 (11.4)	61.7 (16.5)	69.6 (20.9)	80.7 (27.1)	80.3 (26.8)	70.2 (21.2)	56.0 (13.3)	42.8 (6.0)	35.6 (2.0)	55.7 (13.1)
Daily mean °F (°C)	25.7 (−3.5)	26.1 (−3.3)	32.8 (0.4)	40.1 (4.5)	48.4 (9.1)	55.2 (12.9)	62.6 (17.0)	61.9 (16.6)	53.5 (11.9)	42.9 (6.1)	32.6 (0.3)	25.4 (−3.7)	42.3 (5.7)
Mean daily minimum °F (°C)	15.1 (−9.4)	14.6 (−9.7)	21.1 (−6.1)	27.6 (−2.4)	35.1 (1.7)	40.8 (4.9)	44.4 (6.9)	43.4 (6.3)	36.7 (2.6)	29.8 (−1.2)	22.5 (−5.3)	15.2 (−9.3)	28.9 (−1.7)
Mean minimum °F (°C)	−17.9 (−27.7)	−13.8 (−25.4)	−6.1 (−21.2)	8.6 (−13.0)	19.8 (−6.8)	28.9 (−1.7)	34.2 (1.2)	32.4 (0.2)	22.3 (−5.4)	7.8 (−13.4)	−6.2 (−21.2)	−15.4 (−26.3)	−27.8 (−33.2)
Record low °F (°C)	−46 (−43)	−51 (−46)	−40 (−40)	−22 (−30)	2 (−17)	20 (−7)	25 (−4)	21 (−6)	−5 (−21)	−18 (−28)	−37 (−38)	−47 (−44)	−51 (−46)
Average precipitation inches (mm)	0.49 (12)	0.46 (12)	0.78 (20)	1.51 (38)	2.59 (66)	2.91 (74)	1.28 (33)	1.24 (31)	1.29 (33)	1.14 (29)	0.73 (19)	0.52 (13)	14.94 (380)
Average snowfall inches (cm)	7.9 (20)	8.4 (21)	9.5 (24)	10.8 (27)	3.1 (7.9)	0.1 (0.25)	0.0 (0.0)	0.0 (0.0)	0.6 (1.5)	5.5 (14)	8.3 (21)	8.7 (22)	62.9 (158.65)
Average precipitation days (≥ 0.01 in)	4.9	4.9	6.1	8.7	11.0	11.8	7.6	6.7	6.1	6.9	5.5	5.0	85.2
Average snowy days (≥ 0.1 in)	3.5	4.0	3.0	2.9	1.0	0.0	0.0	0.0	0.3	1.7	3.2	3.5	23.1
Source 1: NOAA
Source 2: National Weather Service

== In popular culture ==
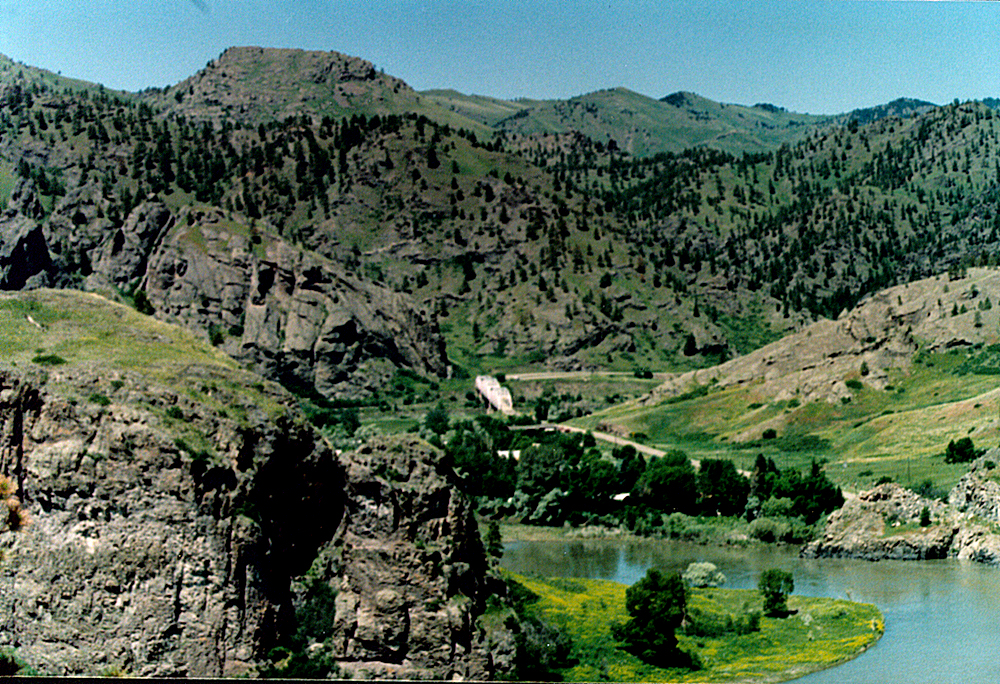
Adel Mountains Volcanic Field about 30 miles southwest of Great Falls, Montana, USA. The Missouri River can be seen in the lower right hand corner of the image. The Hardy Bridge is in the center of the image.

The final scenes of the 1974 motion picture Thunderbolt and Lightfoot was filmed on and next to Interstate 15 as it passed through the Adel volcanics. A portion of the 1987 movie The Untouchables was shot at the Hardy Bridge in the Adel Mountains Volcanic Field, which doubled for the U.S.-Canada border.

Motion picture star Gary Cooper was raised on the Seven Bar Nine Ranch, which was located in the Adel Mountains.

The eruption that formed the Adel Mountains Volcanic Field is depicted in the third episode of the American TV series Dinosaur Planet.

== See also ==
- List of volcanic fields
