= Great Falls Tectonic Zone =

Major intracontinental shear zone between the Hearne craton and Wyoming craton

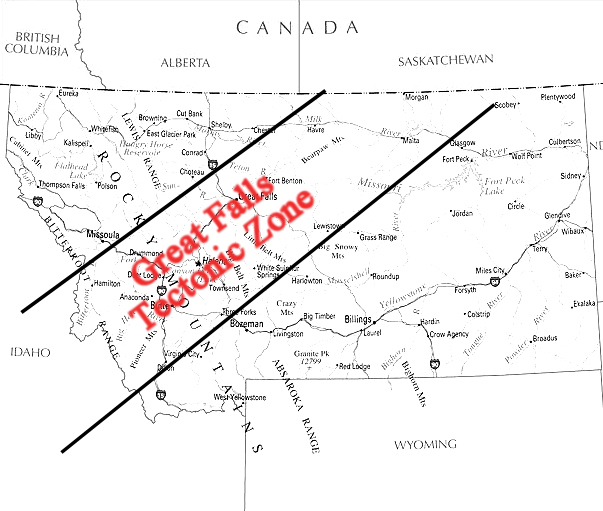
Location of the Great Falls Tectonic Zone.

The Great Falls Tectonic Zone is a major intracontinental shear zone between the Hearne craton and Wyoming craton basement rock of the Archean Eon which form part of the North American continent. The zone is an area about 100 miles (150 km) wide extending from the southwestern Idaho-Montana border across Montana to the northwestern Montana-Saskatchewan-North Dakota border. It is named for the Great Falls of the Missouri River, a major geologic feature of the area. The central and western portions of the zone are believed to be about 1.1 to 3.3 billion years old. The central part of the zone lacks Archean rock, however, leading at least one group of scientists to speculate that it was formed very late in the Paleoproterozoic Era.

The Great Falls tectonic zone has been periodically active since the Proterozoic, and possibly as late as the Holocene. Little of the zone is visible due to Phanerozoic cover, the exception being the Little Belt Mountains. However, it is believed that the tectonic zone controlled the geologic development of nearby basins and subbasins.

The Great Falls tectonic zone was first identified in 1985. Geologists originally believed the zone was part of the Wyoming craton, but now conclude that it is distinct from it. There is continuing controversy over whether the region is a shear zone or suture, and the role the zone played in the formation of the North American continent. At one time, both the Great Falls Tectonic Zone and the Vulcan structure were both considered sutures, but debate remains open on the point. At least one group of geologists has concluded the zone represents the closure of an ocean basin. The zone lacks gravity anomalies or electromagnetic signatures which would allow scientists to conclude that it was generated by subduction. There is significant evidence that the zone has been periodically remineralized since Precambrian times. Square Butte, Shaw Butte, Crown Butte and the other structures of the Adel Mountains Volcanic Field lie astride the tectonic zone near the city of Great Falls.

== See also ==
- North American craton – Craton forming the geological core of North America
- Wyoming Craton – Craton in the west-central United States and western Canada
