= Little Prickly Pear Creek =

Stream in Montana, United States

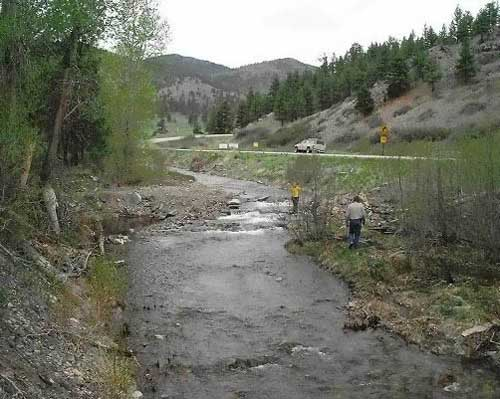
- Etymology: Abundance of prickly pear cacti in the area

Location
- Country: United States
- State: Montana
- Region: Lewis and Clark County
- Municipality: Wolf Creek, Montana

Physical characteristics
- Source: North Fork Little Prickly Pear Creek
  - coordinates: 46.4678790°N 112.43747°W
- 2nd source: South Fork Little Prickly Pear Creek
  - coordinates: 46.78750°N 112.43724°W
- Source confluence
  - coordinates: 36.78786°N 112.43700°W
- Mouth: Missouri River
  - coordinates: 47.02303°N 112.01522°W
- Length: 35 m (115 ft)

Basin features
- River system: Missouri

Little Prickly Pear Creek is a stream which runs through Prickly Pear Canyon in Lewis and Clark County in Montana. The creek is a major spawning and fishing stream, and is protected by several local governing organizations.

== History ==
The Little Prickly Pear Creek and Prickly Pear Canyon were first occupied by Native Americans for thousands of years, but the first noted and documented descriptions of the area were not made until John Mullan's passage of the area in 1859. He stated the canyon, "was a perfect defile" and "by far the most difficult of any point along the road". Later, in 1865, the road was licensed to the Little Prickly Pear Wagon Road Company to improve the road and make it a toll road. Exactly a year later, Helena merchants James King and Warren Gillete spent $40,000 upgrading. After improvements, the road became the Benton Road in the early 1870s, and I-15 in 1967 with a rest stop completed slightly before in 1965.

== Stream course ==
Little Prickly Pear Creek begins its course near Canyon Creek. It continues east, but sharply goes northeast when it meets Trinity Creek. It continues northeast along I-15 until Wolf Creek, where it continues and flows into its mouth, the Missouri River near Wolf Creek Bridge.

== Geology ==
Little Prickly Pear Creek and the Prickly Pear Canyon were formed with the formation the Big Belt Mountains during the Precambrian era. The canyon contains Spokane Shale, Madison Limestone, granite, and other sedimentary rock.

== Species and conservation ==
Little Prickly Pear Creek contain seven species of fish, with four being native to the state. They include the brook trout, brown trout, longnose sucker, mottled sculpin, mountain whitefish, rainbow trout and white sucker.

Little Prickly Pear Creek is an important spawning stream as it provides significant numbers of brown and rainbow trout to the lower section of the Missouri River by Holter Dam. Additionally, the Montana Department of Fish, Wildlife and Parks uses the stream to study how diseases spread in fish and management options.

== Recreational activities ==
Little Prickly Pear Creek offers many recreational activities. They include kayaking, paddleboarding, fishing, swimming, photography and generally walking and hiking.

== Extremities ==
Little Prickly Pear Creek has suffered several floods, most recently in May 2023, spring 2018 and 2011, although the floods caused little damage. However, the flood in 2011 caused BNSF railroad tracks to be restored as well as the building of a channel, and that same channel had to be repaired in 2018 following that year's flooding.
