= Shonkinite =

Intrusive igneous rock

Shonkinite is an intrusive igneous rock found in few places in the world. It is unique in having low silica, feldspathoid minerals, and large blocky crystals of black augite. It makes up much of the hard dark grey rock comprising certain mountains and buttes in Montana that are remnants of laccoliths and stocks, such as the Highwood mountains.

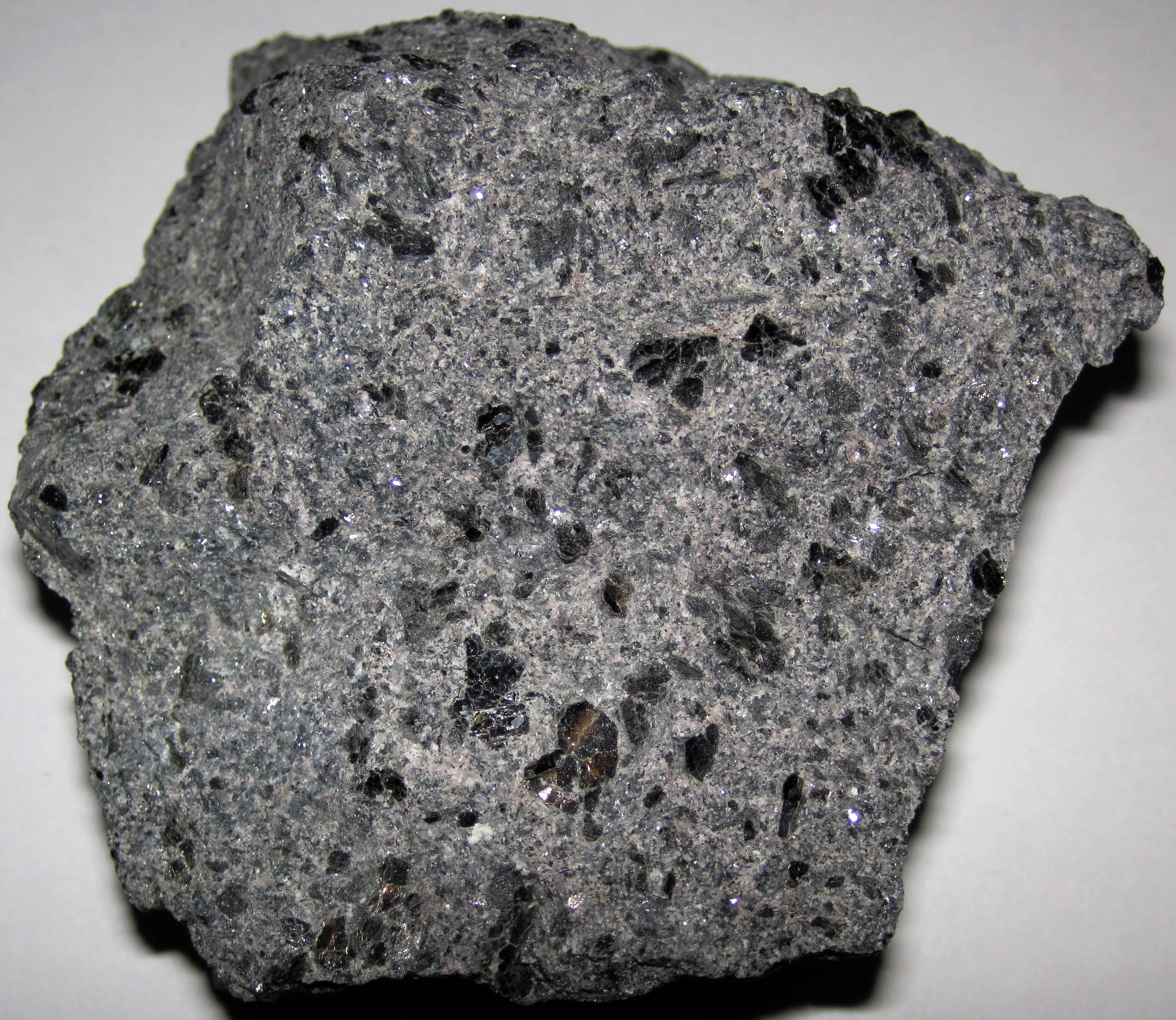
Shonkinite from Mountain Pass in California

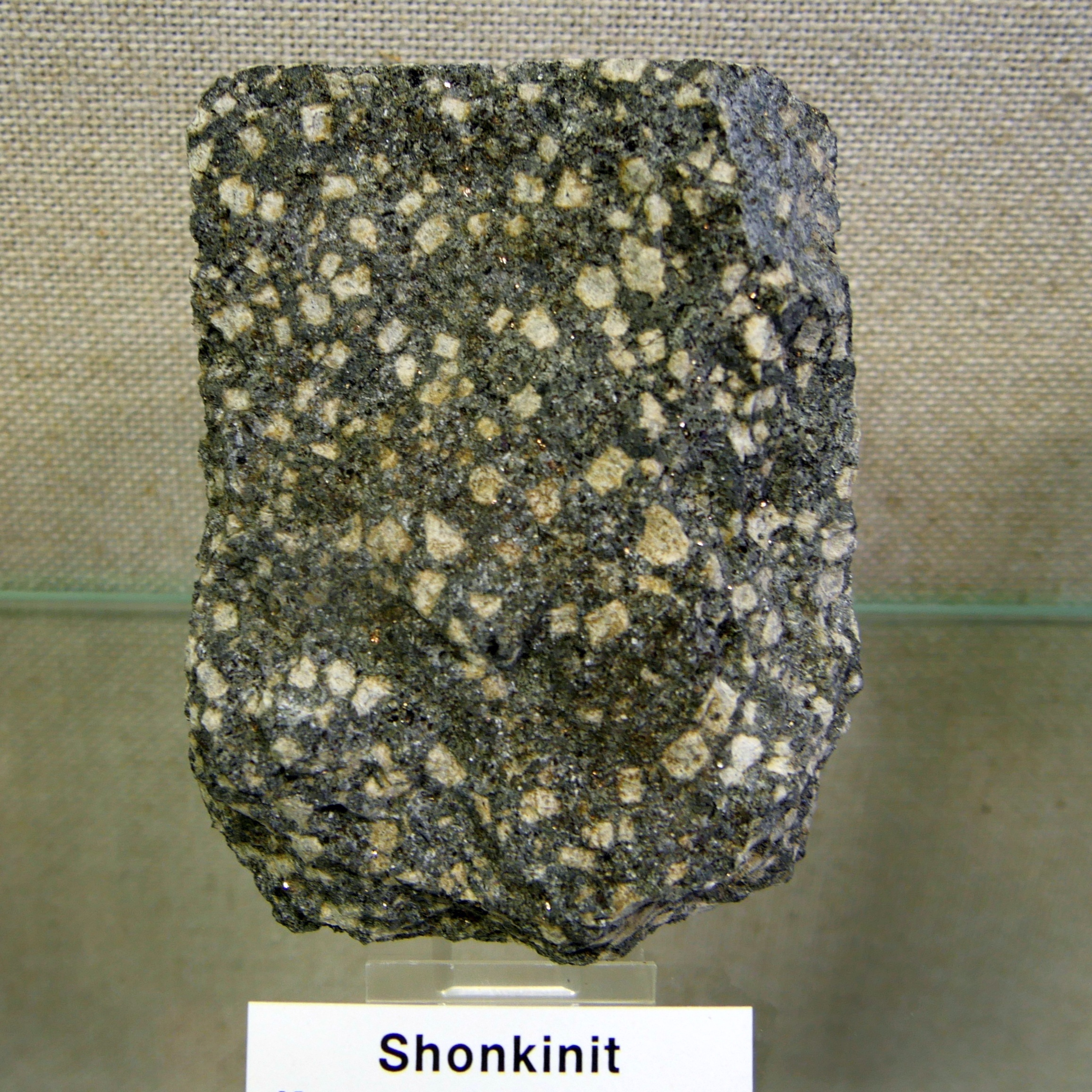
Shonkinite from Katzenbuckel, an extinct volcano in Germany

== Composition ==
Shonkinite is an intrusive igneous rock. More specifically, it is a mafic foidal (feldspathoid bearing) syenite, a holocrystalline (completely crystalline) intrusive rock which, in the restricted sense, is composed of potassic feldspar (in the form of sanidine), with nepheline, augite, biotite, and olivine. Shonkinite is also used for mafic nepheline syenite with aegerine-augite as the pyroxene, and with the addition of plagioclase (andesine to labradorite). Nepheline in shonkinite from the is largely altered to natrolite and stilbite.

The close view of the rocks in the Adel mountains show large glossy crystals of augite in a dark grey matrix made up of small crystals of augite and feldspar. This is unusual as augite is usually dull.

== Formation ==
In central Montana buttes of shonkinite are capped with white layers of syenite. There appear round globes of syenite at the boundary which suggest that the less dense syenite float up to the top of molten shonkinite as the mass cooled.

== Occurrence ==
Examples are:

- The Adel Mountains Volcanic Field in north-central Montana
- Mountain Pass, California.
- in the Salem Block of the Southern Granulite Terrane and the Elchuru alkaline complex in India
- Ontario, Canada
- Timor, Indonesia

== Etymology ==
The rock gets its name from the type locality at Shonkin Sag in the Highwood Mountains of north-central Montana.
