= Cascade, Montana =

Town in Cascade County, Montana, United States

- Town
- Logo

- Location of Cascade, Montana
- Coordinates: 47°16′38″N 111°42′10″W
- Country: United States
- State: Montana
- County: Cascade
- Incorporated: 1911

Area
  - Town: 0.66 sq mi (1.71 km^{2})
  - Land: 0.66 sq mi (1.70 km^{2})
  - Water: 0.0039 sq mi (0.01 km^{2})
- Elevation: 3,419 ft (1,042 m)

Population (2020)
  - Town: 600
  - Density: 914.4/sq mi (353.05/km^{2})
  - Metro: 84,414
- Time zone: UTC-7 (Mountain (MST))
  - Summer (DST): UTC-6 (MDT)
- ZIP code: 59421
- Area code: 406
- FIPS code: 30-12775
- GNIS feature ID: 2413176
- Website: www.cascademontana.com

Cascade is a town in Cascade County, Montana, United States. The population was 600 at the 2020 census. It is part of the Great Falls, Montana Metropolitan Statistical Area, which in 2020 had a population of 84,414. Cascade was incorporated in 1911.

== History ==
Montana Central Railway built a line on the west side of the Missouri River, prompting a town to form to provide services to railroad workers. Originally named Dodge, the town changed its name in 1887 as an appeal to become the county seat of the newly formed county.

The founder of the town was Thomas Gorham. He was also the first mayor, postmaster, and owned Gorham General Store. His son-in-law, Ben Roberts, became friends with western artist Charlie Russell. While visiting, Russell met his eventual wife Nancy Cooper. After marrying, the couple lived in what is now called the Charlie and Nancy Russell Honeymoon Cabin until moving to Great Falls in 1897. The property is now listed on the National Register of Historic Places and open for public viewing.

Another property of significance is the St. Peter's Mission Church and Cemetery. It was founded in the 1860s by Jesuit priests though moved a few times. Eventually a boys' school, girls' school, and residences were added. Now only a small chapel remains.

One notable resident of the Mission was Mary Fields, a.k.a. "Stagecoach Mary", the first Black woman to be employed as a star route postwoman. She delivered mail between the Mission and Cascade from 1895 to 1903.

== Geography ==
Interstate 15 passes through the community. The town is situated along the Missouri River.

According to the United States Census Bureau, the town has a total area of 0.53 square miles (1.37 km^{2}), all land.

=== Climate ===
According to the Köppen Climate Classification system, Cascade has a semi-arid climate, abbreviated "BSk" on climate maps.

Climate data for Cascade, Montana, 1991–2020 normals, extremes 1904–2022: 3,360 feet (1,020 m)
| Month | Jan | Feb | Mar | Apr | May | Jun | Jul | Aug | Sep | Oct | Nov | Dec | Year |
|---|---|---|---|---|---|---|---|---|---|---|---|---|---|
| Record high °F (°C) | 70 (21) | 71 (22) | 80 (27) | 91 (33) | 96 (36) | 103 (39) | 104 (40) | 109 (43) | 103 (39) | 94 (34) | 77 (25) | 73 (23) | 109 (43) |
| Mean maximum °F (°C) | 59.6 (15.3) | 60.1 (15.6) | 69.5 (20.8) | 77.2 (25.1) | 84.4 (29.1) | 90.6 (32.6) | 97.4 (36.3) | 97.1 (36.2) | 91.7 (33.2) | 81.4 (27.4) | 66.9 (19.4) | 57.2 (14.0) | 98.9 (37.2) |
| Mean daily maximum °F (°C) | 38.9 (3.8) | 40.4 (4.7) | 49.4 (9.7) | 57.9 (14.4) | 67.0 (19.4) | 74.7 (23.7) | 85.7 (29.8) | 85.0 (29.4) | 74.3 (23.5) | 59.9 (15.5) | 46.6 (8.1) | 38.3 (3.5) | 59.8 (15.5) |
| Daily mean °F (°C) | 28.8 (−1.8) | 29.5 (−1.4) | 37.2 (2.9) | 45.4 (7.4) | 53.6 (12.0) | 61.1 (16.2) | 68.7 (20.4) | 67.4 (19.7) | 58.9 (14.9) | 47.7 (8.7) | 36.9 (2.7) | 29.1 (−1.6) | 47.0 (8.3) |
| Mean daily minimum °F (°C) | 18.7 (−7.4) | 18.5 (−7.5) | 25.0 (−3.9) | 32.8 (0.4) | 40.2 (4.6) | 47.4 (8.6) | 51.7 (10.9) | 49.9 (9.9) | 43.5 (6.4) | 35.6 (2.0) | 27.1 (−2.7) | 19.9 (−6.7) | 34.2 (1.2) |
| Mean minimum °F (°C) | −21.2 (−29.6) | −13.1 (−25.1) | −3.8 (−19.9) | 13.8 (−10.1) | 23.9 (−4.5) | 33.7 (0.9) | 40.1 (4.5) | 36.1 (2.3) | 26.3 (−3.2) | 11.0 (−11.7) | −8.0 (−22.2) | −16.4 (−26.9) | −30.6 (−34.8) |
| Record low °F (°C) | −52 (−47) | −57 (−49) | −42 (−41) | −18 (−28) | 8 (−13) | 24 (−4) | 32 (0) | 29 (−2) | 6 (−14) | −18 (−28) | −37 (−38) | −51 (−46) | −57 (−49) |
| Average precipitation inches (mm) | 0.54 (14) | 0.69 (18) | 0.80 (20) | 2.23 (57) | 2.98 (76) | 2.90 (74) | 1.17 (30) | 1.17 (30) | 1.63 (41) | 1.37 (35) | 0.71 (18) | 0.69 (18) | 16.88 (431) |
| Average snowfall inches (cm) | 10.6 (27) | 10.5 (27) | 9.2 (23) | 9.9 (25) | 1.2 (3.0) | 0.0 (0.0) | 0.0 (0.0) | 0.2 (0.51) | 0.3 (0.76) | 4.6 (12) | 9.8 (25) | 10.5 (27) | 66.8 (170.27) |
| Average precipitation days (≥ 0.01 in) | 5.4 | 5.9 | 6.5 | 8.5 | 9.4 | 9.9 | 6.2 | 6.2 | 5.3 | 5.9 | 5.2 | 5.4 | 79.8 |
| Average snowy days (≥ 0.1 in) | 4.6 | 4.8 | 4.5 | 2.7 | 0.6 | 0.0 | 0.0 | 0.0 | 0.2 | 1.9 | 3.8 | 4.7 | 27.8 |
Source 1: NOAA
Source 2: XMACIS2

== Demographics ==
Historical population
| Census | Pop. | Note | %± |
|---|---|---|---|
| 1920 | 465 | | — |
| 1930 | 520 | | 11.8% |
| 1940 | 419 | | −19.4% |
| 1950 | 447 | | 6.7% |
| 1960 | 604 | | 35.1% |
| 1970 | 714 | | 18.2% |
| 1980 | 773 | | 8.3% |
| 1990 | 729 | | −5.7% |
| 2000 | 819 | | 12.3% |
| 2010 | 685 | | −16.4% |
| 2020 | 600 | | −12.4% |
U.S. Decennial Census

=== 2010 census ===
As of the census of 2010, there were 685 people, 287 households, and 188 families living in the town. The population density was 1,292.5 inhabitants per square mile (499.0/km^{2}). There were 328 housing units at an average density of 618.9 per square mile (239.0/km^{2}). The racial makeup of the town was 94.9% White, 2.5% Native American, 0.7% from other races, and 1.9% from two or more races. Hispanic or Latino of any race were 2.5% of the population.

There were 287 households, of which 27.5% had children under the age of 18 living with them, 53.3% were married couples living together, 8.4% had a female householder with no husband present, 3.8% had a male householder with no wife present, and 34.5% were non-families. 28.6% of all households were made up of individuals, and 14.7% had someone living alone who was 65 years of age or older. The average household size was 2.32 and the average family size was 2.87.

The median age in the town was 47.6 years. 22% of residents were under the age of 18; 5.8% were between the ages of 18 and 24; 18.3% were from 25 to 44; 31.1% were from 45 to 64; and 22.6% were 65 years of age or older. The gender makeup of the town was 47.3% male and 52.7% female.

=== 2000 census ===
As of the census of 2000, there were 819 people, 323 households, and 221 families living in the town. The population density was 1,561.9 inhabitants per square mile (603.1/km^{2}). There were 349 housing units at an average density of 665.6 per square mile (257.0/km^{2}). The racial makeup of the town was 97.56% White, 0.37% African American, 1.22% Native American, and 0.85% from two or more races. Hispanic or Latino of any race were 0.73% of the population.

There were 323 households, out of which 34.7% had children under the age of 18 living with them, 56.0% were married couples living together, 9.0% had a female householder with no husband present, and 31.3% were non-families. 28.2% of all households were made up of individuals, and 16.7% had someone living alone who was 65 years of age or older. The average household size was 2.54 and the average family size was 3.14.

In the town, the population was spread out, with 30.0% under the age of 18, 6.8% from 18 to 24, 24.4% from 25 to 44, 21.7% from 45 to 64, and 17.0% who were 65 years of age or older. The median age was 40 years. For every 100 females, there were 91.4 males. For every 100 females age 18 and over, there were 94.9 males.

The median income for a household in the town was $30,602, and the median income for a family was $34,938. Males had a median income of $30,446 versus $18,542 for females. The per capita income for the town was $14,219. About 10.0% of families and 12.1% of the population were below the poverty line, including 16.2% of those under age 18 and 10.7% of those age 65 or over.

== Government ==
Cascade has a mayor and four city councilors. In November 2025 incumbent mayor Wes Seabolt ran unopposed. Seabolt was appointed mayor in May 2024.

== Arts and culture ==
Atkinson Park has a pool, playground, skatepark, and offers free camping. It was named for J. Robert Atkinson, the founder of the Braille Institute of America, who moved to the Cascade area as a teenager. His widow had the park built in his honor. Railroad Park has horseshoe pits and covered picnic areas. North Park provides fishing access and a boat ramp.

Nearby Tower Rock marks the entrance to the Missouri River Canyon. It was used as a landmark by many Native American tribes and noted by the Lewis and Clark Expedition. There is a day-use camp with a hiking trail and interpretive panels.

Wedsworth Memorial Library is a public library in Cascade. Augustus Wedsworth was a homesteader who came to own several ranches. After retirement he was President of Cascade Milling and Elevator Company, Vice President of the Cascade Mercantile Company, and director of First State Bank. In 1915 his will provided money for creating and maintaining a library as well as a gymnasium.

== Education ==
Cascade Public Schools educates students from kindergarten through 12th grade. It also serves the nearby towns of Ulm, Deep Creek, Craig, and Wolf Creek. The team name for Cascade High School is the Badgers.

== Media ==
The Cascade Courier is a local newspaper. It is printed weekly and is also available online.

The FM radio station KIKF is licensed in Cascade.

== Notable people ==
- Steamboat Williams, Major League Baseball player was born in Cascade

== See also ==
- List of municipalities in Montana
