= List of lakes of Lewis and Clark County, Montana =

There are at least 67 named lakes and reservoirs in Lewis and Clark County, Montana.

== Lakes ==
- Alpine Lake, 47°23′54″N 112°46′18″W, el. 6,873 feet (2,095 m)
- Beale Lake, 47°30′11″N 112°29′41″W, el. 4,360 feet (1,330 m)
- Bean Lake, 47°18′22″N 112°25′50″W, el. 4,557 feet (1,389 m)
- Bear Lake, 47°37′19″N 112°59′38″W, el. 6,870 feet (2,090 m)
- Beaver Ponds, 46°41′49″N 112°21′07″W, el. 5,919 feet (1,804 m)
- Beaver Ponds, 46°40′8″N 112°21′09″W, el. 5,860 feet (1,790 m)
- Bighorn Lake, 47°11′18″N 112°36′20″W, el. 7,497 feet (2,285 m)
- Camp Lake, 47°10′53″N 113°02′21″W, el. 6,145 feet (1,873 m)
- Canyon Lake, 47°11′32″N 113°00′54″W, el. 5,748 feet (1,752 m)
- Connors Lake, 47°22′02″N 112°27′50″W, el. 4,511 feet (1,375 m)
- Copper Lake, 47°03′46″N 112°43′56″W, el. 6,873 feet (2,095 m)
- Flesher Lakes, 47°00′12″N 112°29′42″W, el. 4,882 feet (1,488 m)
- Gates Lake, 47°46′58″N 112°56′28″W, el. 5,351 feet (1,631 m)
- Grassy Lake, 47°35′44″N 112°51′19″W, el. 5,840 feet (1,780 m)
- Gravelly Range Lake, 46°49′51″N 112°22′13″W, el. 4,908 feet (1,496 m)
- Hazard Lake, 47°42′30″N 112°56′23″W, el. 5,590 feet (1,700 m)
- Heart Lake, 47°08′15″N 112°39′04″W, el. 6,434 feet (1,961 m)
- Hermit Lake, 47°35′33″N 113°06′21″W, el. 7,828 feet (2,386 m)
- Herrin Lakes, 46°55′16″N 112°41′17″W, el. 4,665 feet (1,422 m)
- Hidden Lake, 47°30′34″N 112°45′12″W, el. 5,987 feet (1,825 m)
- Keep Cool Lakes, 47°00′25″N 112°35′41″W, el. 4,987 feet (1,520 m)
- Krohn Lake, 47°02′25″N 112°31′38″W, el. 5,144 feet (1,568 m)
- Krone Lake, 47°26′09″N 112°24′11″W, el. 4,239 feet (1,292 m)
- Lake Levale, 47°53′29″N 113°03′59″W, el. 7,155 feet (2,181 m)
- Lake Quiet, 47°52′19″N 113°01′12″W, el. 7,070 feet (2,150 m)
- Meadow Lake, 47°08′43″N 112°47′24″W, el. 5,833 feet (1,778 m)
- Meyer Lake, 47°30′05″N 112°19′13″W, el. 3,996 feet (1,218 m)
- My Lake, 47°44′29″N 113°08′25″W, el. 7,359 feet (2,243 m)
- Parker Lake, 47°09′12″N 112°44′30″W, el. 5,991 feet (1,826 m)
- Red Lake, 47°35′46″N 112°42′11″W, el. 5,230 feet (1,590 m)
- Renshaw Lake, 47°30′45″N 112°48′45″W, el. 7,149 feet (2,179 m)
- Silver King Lake, 47°04′54″N 112°32′43″W, el. 5,417 feet (1,651 m)
- Smith Lake, 46°58′18″N 112°42′31″W, el. 4,547 feet (1,386 m)
- Smith Lake, 47°24′59″N 112°31′39″W, el. 4,445 feet (1,355 m)
- Snowbank Lake, 47°04′28″N 112°37′02″W, el. 5,315 feet (1,620 m)
- Sock Lake, 47°47′53″N 113°03′45″W, el. 7,484 feet (2,281 m)
- Sun Lake, 47°20′56″N 112°52′44″W, el. 6,988 feet (2,130 m)
- Twin Lakes, 47°09′54″N 112°46′21″W, el. 5,994 feet (1,827 m)
- Twin Lakes, 47°16′12″N 112°43′12″W, el. 6,752 feet (2,058 m)
- Two Point Lake, 47°09′30″N 112°43′13″W, el. 6,188 feet (1,886 m)
- Unnamed Lake, 47°45′23″N 113°04′10″W, el. 7,155 feet (2,181 m)
- Upper Copper Lake, 47°04′32″N 112°44′58″W, el. 7,244 feet (2,208 m)
- Upper Holter Lake, 46°49′35″N 111°56′52″W, el. 3,583 feet (1,092 m)
- Webb Lake, 47°08′43″N 112°41′41″W, el. 6,106 feet (1,861 m)
- Wood Lake, 47°25′52″N 112°47′53″W, el. 5,748 feet (1,752 m)

== Reservoirs ==
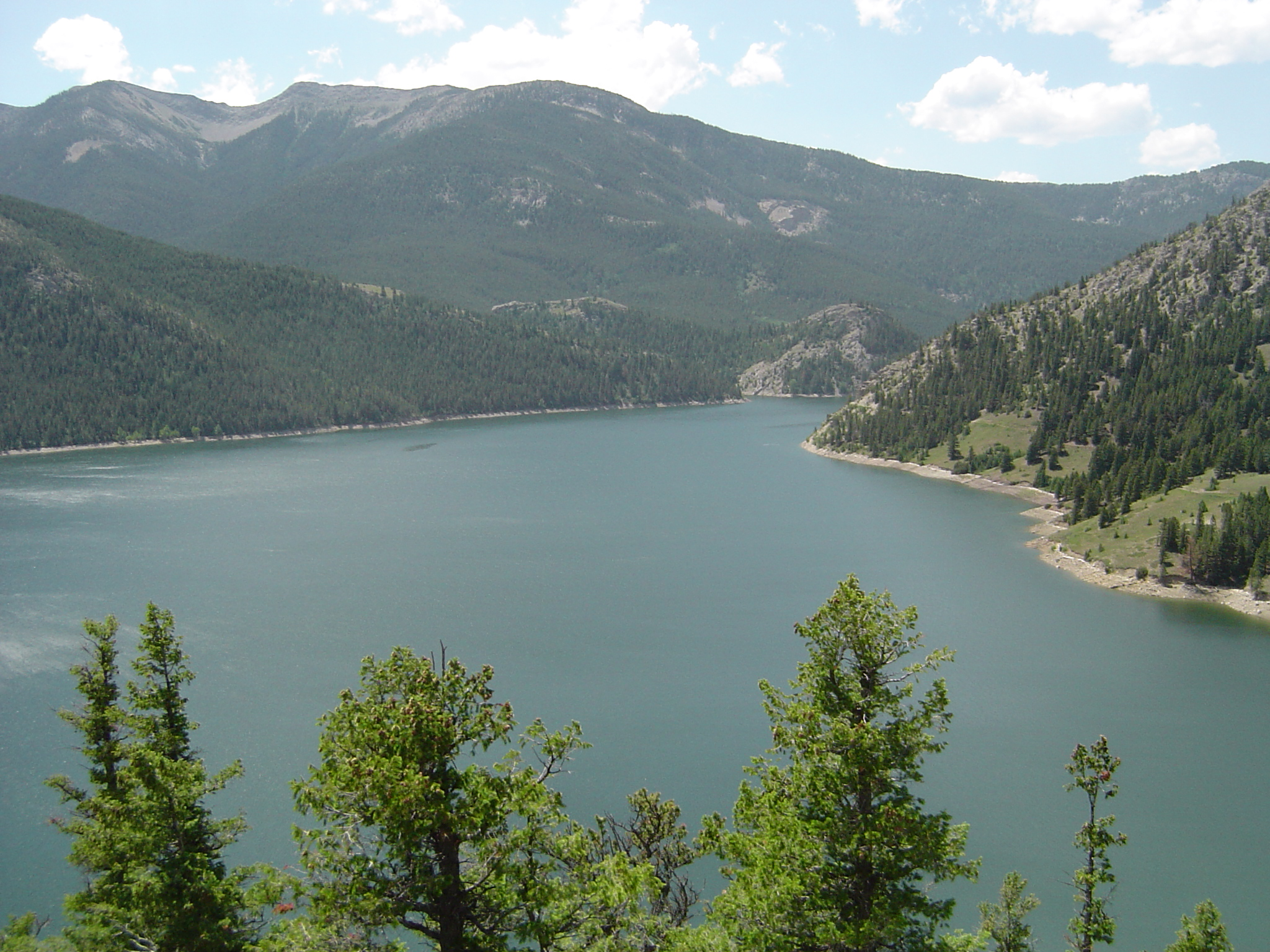
Gibson Reservoir, Montana

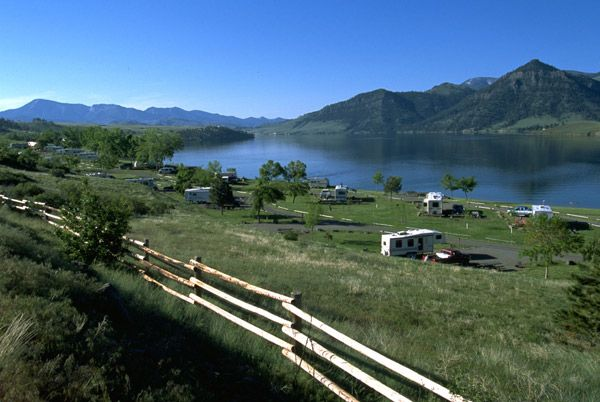
Holter Lake

- Anderson Lake, 47°28′32″N 112°35′09″W, el. 4,528 feet (1,380 m)
- Canyon Ferry Lake, 46°38′55″N 111°43′39″W, el. 3,799 feet (1,158 m)
- Chessman Reservoir, 46°28′24″N 112°11′09″W, el. 6,224 feet (1,897 m)
- Chessman Reservoir, 46°28′14″N 112°11′38″W, el. 6,197 feet (1,889 m)
- Diversion Lake, 47°37′16″N 112°42′23″W, el. 4,495 feet (1,370 m)
- Dry Creek-Krezelok Reservoir, 47°27′00″N 112°12′51″W, el. 3,911 feet (1,192 m)
- Gibson Reservoir, 47°36′05″N 112°45′40″W, el. 4,610 feet (1,410 m)
- Gravelly Range Lake, 46°50′06″N 112°22′27″W, el. 4,898 feet (1,493 m)
- Hauser Lake, 46°45′53″N 111°53′13″W, el. 3,655 feet (1,114 m)
- Helena Valley Regulating Reservoir, 46°38′29″N 111°52′58″W, el. 3,825 feet (1,166 m)
- Helena Valley Reservoir, 46°38′30″N 111°53′09″W, el. 3,750 feet (1,140 m)
- Holter Lake, 46°59′29″N 112°00′18″W, el. 3,510 feet (1,070 m)
- Lake Helena, 46°42′10″N 111°54′07″W, el. 3,655 feet (1,114 m)
- Mike Horse, 47°01′42″N 112°21′15″W, el. 5,446 feet (1,660 m)
- Nilan Reservoir, 47°28′27″N 112°31′02″W, el. 4,449 feet (1,356 m)
- Scott Reservoir, 46°25′18″N 111°54′55″W, el. 4,993 feet (1,522 m)
- Scott Reservoir, 46°25′48″N 112°15′51″W, el. 7,169 feet (2,185 m)
- Soap Creek Reservoir, 47°20′54″N 112°20′21″W, el. 4,452 feet (1,357 m)
- Stansfield Lake, 46°38′24″N 111°58′56″W, el. 3,714 feet (1,132 m)
- Travis Reservoir, 46°26′42″N 112°18′19″W, el. 6,755 feet (2,059 m)
- Willow Creek Reservoir, 47°32′50″N 112°25′46″W, el. 4,150 feet (1,260 m)
- Wood Lake, 47°26′00″N 112°48′09″W, el. 5,748 feet (1,752 m)

== See also ==
- List of lakes in Montana
