= Helena Valley (Montana) =

Valley in Lewis and Clark County, Montana

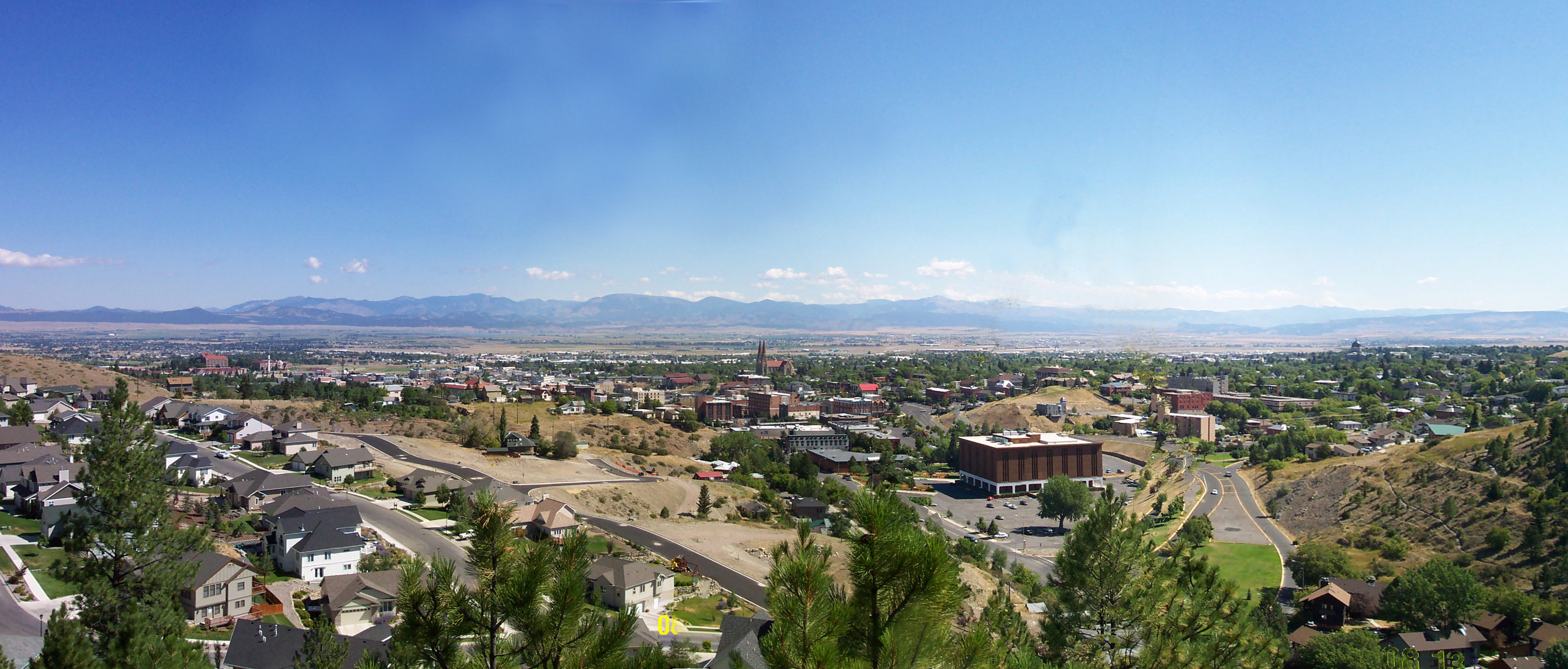
- Helena Montana 2006
- Floor elevation: 3,650 ft (1,110 m)

Geology
- Type: structural intermontane basin

Geography
- Country: United States
- State: Montana
- District: Lewis and Clark County
- Population center: Helena, Montana
- Coordinates: 46.43185°N 112.01263°W
- Lake: Lake Helena
- Interactive map of Helena Valley

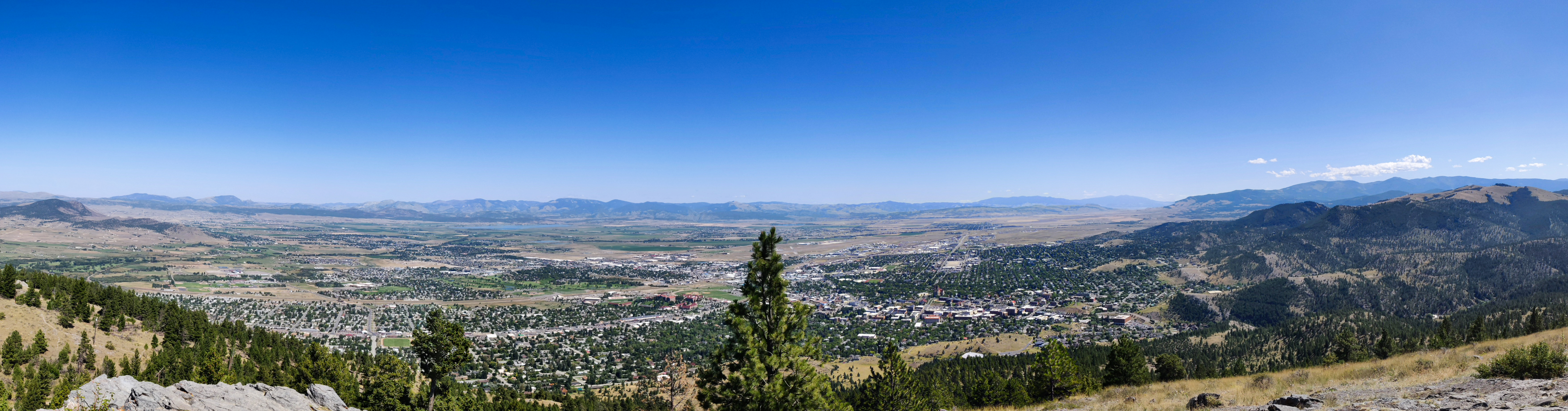
Helena and the Helena Valley

The Helena Valley is a topographic and structural intermontane basin in Lewis and Clark County, Montana. The valley encompasses the city of Helena and surrounding communities, residences, and farmland.

== Geography ==
=== Surrounding formations ===
The Helena Valley is surrounded by various geographical areas, including the Northern Rocky Mountains, the Continental Divide, the Boulder Batholith formation, Gates of the Mountains, Adel Mountains, Big Belt Mountains, and the Elkhorn Mountains. Additionally, various rock formations and types can be found in the area including Pilgrim Limestone, Park Shale, Meagher Limestone, Wolsey Shale, Flathead Sandstone, Helena Dolomite, Jeferson Dolomite, Three Forks Shale, Mississippian Madison, Spokane Shale, and other rocks, but Cretaceous, volcanic, and other rocks from similar time periods generally make up the area. However, major collections of rock formations occur more often in the mountains and other formations surrounding the valley.

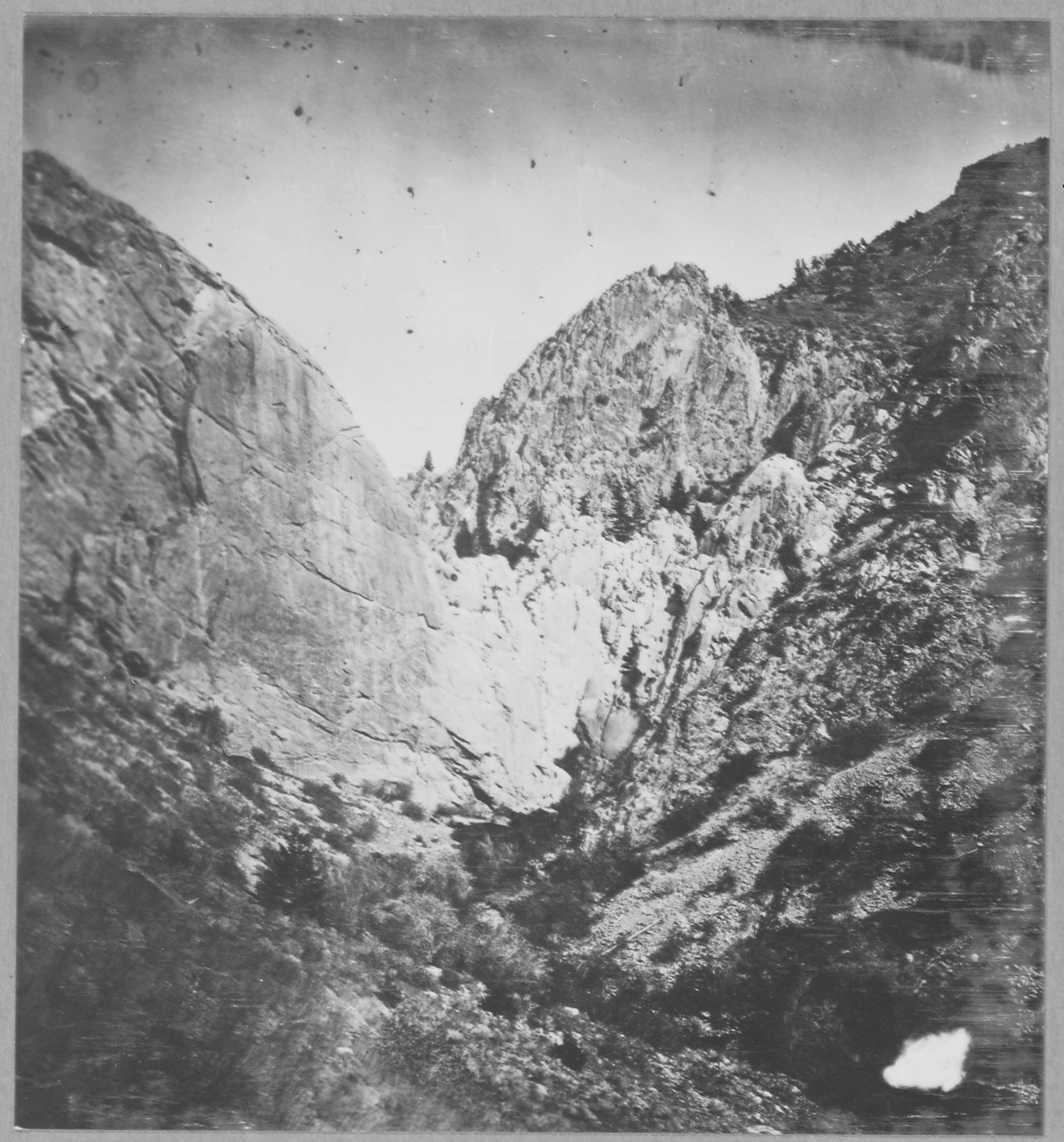
Hellgate Canyon, near Helena

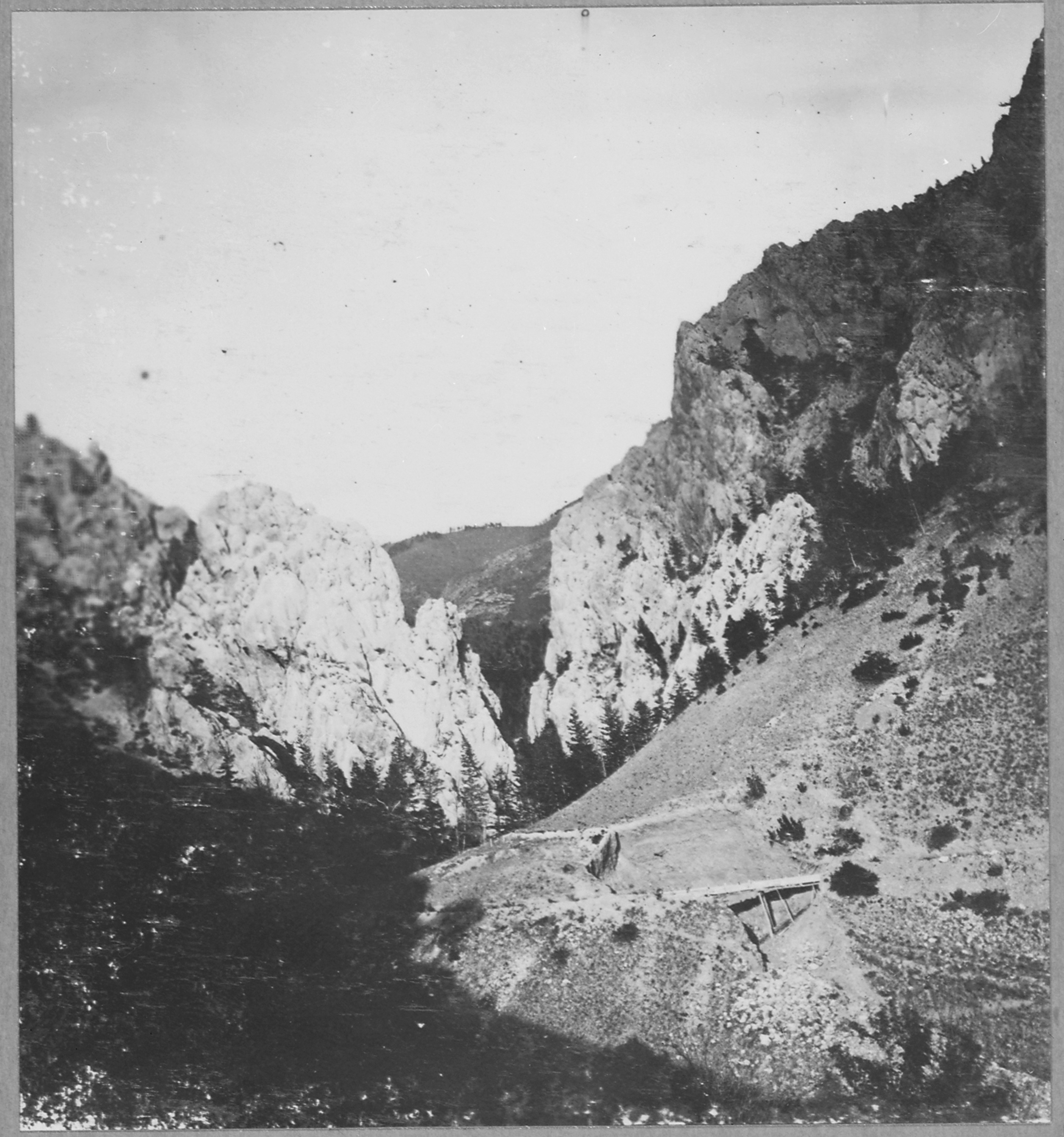
Avalanche Canyon, near Helena

=== Geographic formation of the Helena Valley ===
Long before the Helena Valley, the Boulder batholith stood where Helena sits. It is said that the rocks at the time were around 80 million years old. Additionally, other formations stood, including granitic stocks. Then, around 65 million years ago, an east–west expansion pulled the mountains out, which allowed for the forming of the valley around 50 million years ago. Afterwards, the Helena Valley fault caused the northeast corner of the valley to subside. In addition to subsiding, the shift caused bedrock to be deposited into the soil, creating a bedrock layer. Today, topographic data of the region show that this formation shift is now 6,000 feet below the surface of Lake Helena. More recently, around 5 million years ago, seismic events caused erosional surfaces, deposits coarse gravel, and bedrock erosions. Even more recently, from 100,000 to 150,000 years ago, glaciers were formed and drained, causing creeks such as Tenmile Creek to be formed. Such creeks deposited fine-grained deposits during their creation. Today, nearby mountains to the valley are eroding and the valley is slowly filling with materials.

=== Geographic faults and seismic formations of the Helena Valley ===
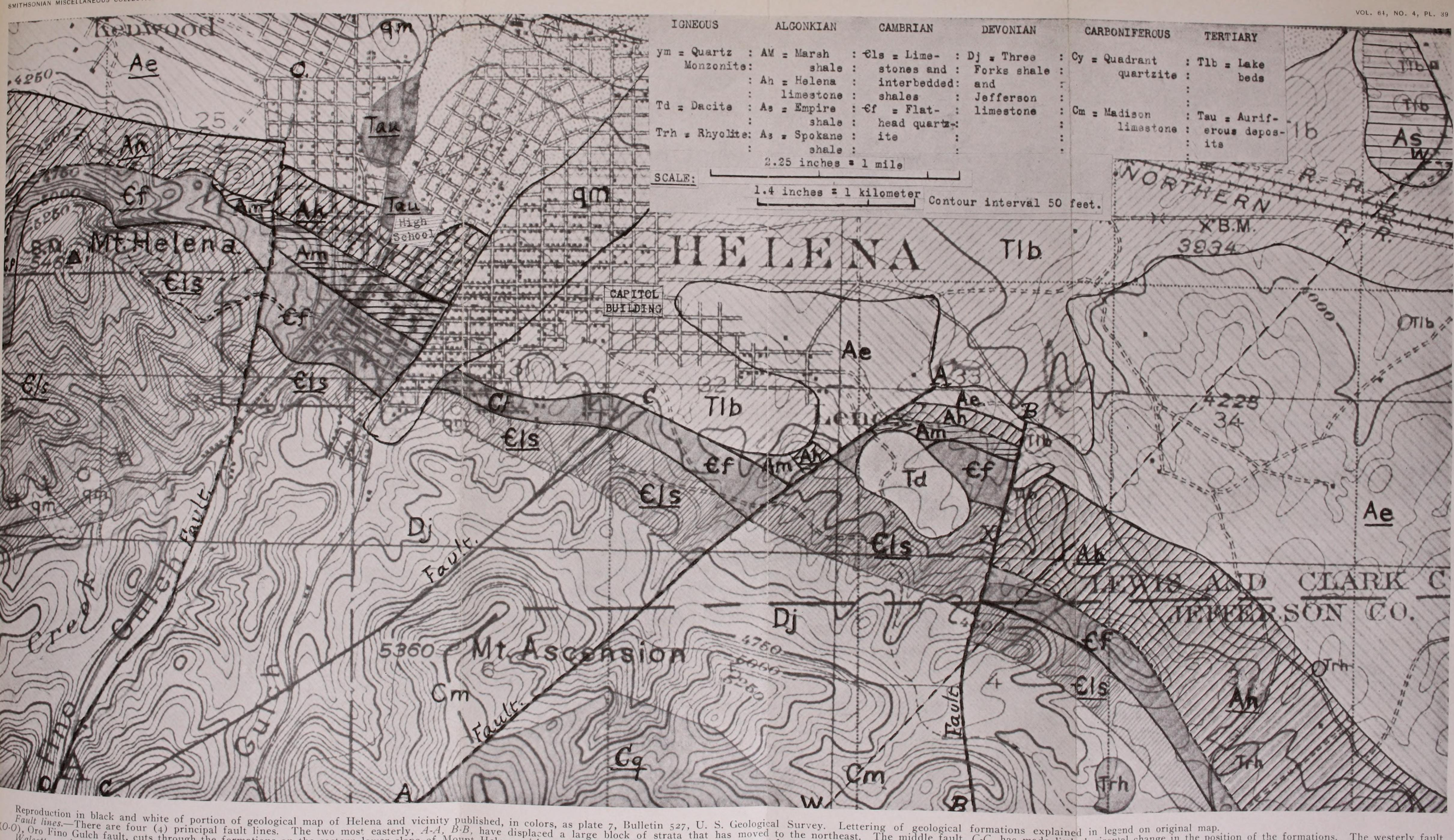
Geographic map of faults and other seismic areas of the Helena Valley

Beneath Helena sits a major seismic fault-the Intermountain Seismic Belt. Although the belt typically produces small and minor earthquakes, the zone expands from Arizona to Montana and has been known to produce moderate to severe earthquakes before, including the 1935 Helena Earthquake. In addition, the major belt, Helena also has a small seismic belt called the Helena Valley Fault System, which is a collection of small faults and cracks under Helena. The system also typically produces little earthquakes, and most are minor in size. With the Rocky Mountains surrounding the valley, small faults generally are forming all the time from tectonic movement under the mountains, which can cause small seismic activity from time to time.

=== Geographic activity and events in the Helena Valley ===
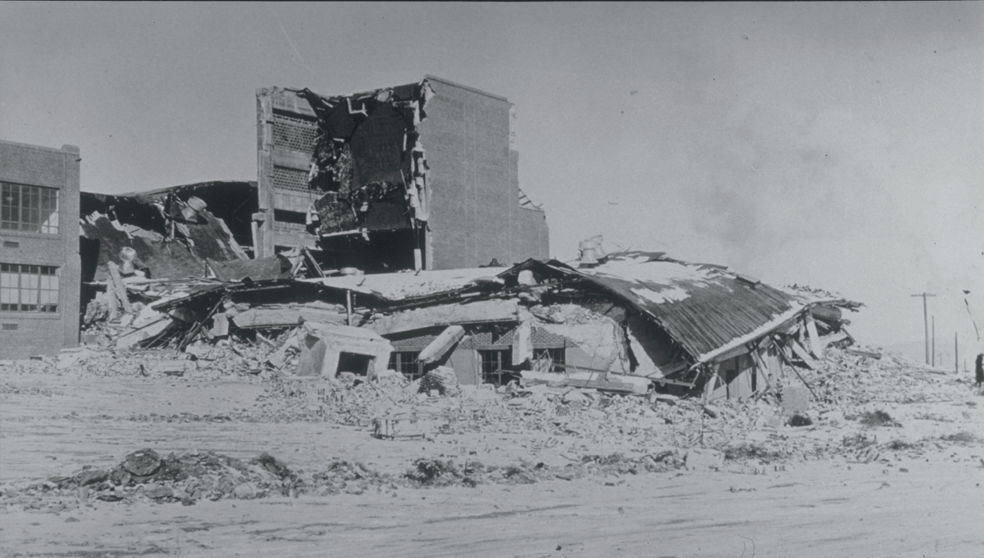
Damage to the Helena High School after the 1935 earthquake

Due to the various rock formations, complex geographic history of the area, and several fault lines beneath, the valley has experienced many seismic events, with smaller ones being more frequent although larger earthquakes have happened before. According to Homefacts and the United States Geological Service, Helena has experienced 239 earthquakes within a 30-mile radius since 1931 and has a 51.58% possibility of another one 5.0+ magnitude in the next 50 years. Over history, Helena has experienced several minor to severe earthquakes. In 1935, the "Big Shake" occurred, a 6.2 magnitude earthquake dubbed the 5th most destructive earthquake in U.S. history. The area, although did not form the quakes, also experienced the Hebgen and Clarkston Valley Earthquakes, both above 6.0 magnitude. Most recently, a 2.7 earthquake occurred on March 9, 2025, near the city.

== History ==
The Helena area was long inhabited by various indigenous peoples. Evidence from the MacHaffie and Indian Creek sites on opposite sides of the Elkhorn Mountains southeast of the Helena Valley show that people of the Folsom culture lived in the area more than 10,000 years ago. Before the introduction of the horse 300 years ago, and since, other native peoples, including the Salish and the Blackfeet, visited the area seasonally on their nomadic rounds.

=== Early European settlement and gold rush ===
By the early 1800s, people of European descent from the United States and British Canada began arriving to work the streams of the Missouri River watershed looking for fur-bearing animals such as the beaver, undoubtedly bringing them through the area now known as the Helena Valley.

Gold strikes in Idaho Territory in the early 1860s attracted many migrants who initiated major gold rushes at Grasshopper Creek (Bannack) and Alder Gulch (Virginia City) in 1862 and 1863 respectively. So many people came that the federal government created a new territory called Montana in May 1864. The miners prospected far and wide for new placer gold discoveries. On July 14, 1864, the discovery of gold by a prospecting party known as the "Four Georgians" in a gulch off the Prickly Pear Creek led to the founding of a mining camp along a small creek in the area they called "Last Chance Gulch". In the 1870s, a Pennsylvania brick and stonemason named Louis Reeder built Reeder's Alley. It is a strong link to the beginnings of the settlement. He invested in the lots along then Cutler Street (now known as Reeder's Alley) and between 1872 and 1884 built over 30 brick and stone one-room tenements for miners. In 1876, Thomas Cruse, a prospector of Irish descent, discovered a massive gold deposit in the mountains, northwest of Helena. He soon filed a mining patent on 20.25 acres and opened the famous Drumlummon Mine which produced a rich bounty of gold and silver worth millions of dollars.

By fall of 1864, the population had grown to over 200, and some thought the name "Last Chance" was too crass. On October 30, 1864, a group of at least seven self-appointed men met to name the town, authorize the layout of the streets, and elect commissioners. The first suggestion was "Tomah", a word the committee thought had connections to the local Indian people. Other nominations included Pumpkinville and Squashtown (as the meeting was held the day before Halloween). Other suggestions were to name the community after various Minnesota towns, such as Winona and Rochester, as a number of settlers had come from Minnesota. Finally, a Scotsman, John Summerville, proposed Helena, which he pronounced /həˈliːnə/ hə-LEE-nə, in honor of Helena Township, Scott County, Minnesota. This immediately caused an uproar from the former Confederates in the room, who insisted upon the pronunciation /ˈhɛlɪnə/ HEL-i-nə, after Helena, Arkansas, a town on the Mississippi River. While the name "Helena" won, the pronunciation varied until approximately 1882 when the /ˈhɛlɪnə/ HEL-i-nə pronunciation became dominant. Later tales of the naming of Helena claimed the name came from the island of St. Helena, where Napoleon was exiled, or was that of a miner's sweetheart.

Helena was surveyed by Captain John Wood in 1865 for the first time. The original streets of Helena followed the paths of miners, thus making the city blocks of Early Helena various sizes and shapes.

In 1870, Henry D. Washburn, having been appointed Surveyor General of Montana in 1869, organized the Washburn-Langford-Doane Expedition in Helena to explore the regions that would become Yellowstone National Park. Mount Washburn, within the park, is named for him. Members of the expedition included Helena residents:

- Truman C. Everts, former U.S. Assessor for the Montana Territory
- Cornelius Hedges, U.S. Attorney of the Montana Territory
- Samuel T. Hauser, president of the First National Bank, Helena, Montana; later a Governor of the Montana Territory
- Warren C. Gillette, Helena merchant
- Walter Trumbull, son of U.S. Senator Lyman Trumbull (Illinois)
- Nathaniel P. Langford, then former U.S. Collector of Internal Revenue for Montana Territory. Langford helped Washburn organize the expedition and later helped publicize the remarkable Yellowstone region. In May 1872 after the park was established, Langford was appointed by the Department of Interior as its first superintendent.

=== Wealth boom ===
By 1888 about 50 millionaires lived in Helena, more per capita than in any city in the world. They had made their fortunes from gold. It is estimated about $3.6 billion in today's money was extracted from Helena during this period of time. The Last Chance Placer is one of the most famous placer deposits in the western United States. Most of the production occurred before 1868. Much of the placer is now under Helena's streets and buildings.

This large concentration of wealth was the basis of developing fine residences and ambitious architecture in the city; its Victorian neighborhoods reflect the gold years. The numerous miners also attracted the development of a thriving red light district. Among the well-known local madams was Josephine "Chicago Joe" Airey, who built a thriving business empire between 1874 and 1893, becoming one of Helena's largest and most influential landowners. Helena's brothels were a successful part of the local business community well into the 20th century, ending with the 1973 death of Helena's last madam, "Big Dorothy" Baker.

== Municipalities ==
The Helena Valley contains two cities:

- Helena
- East Helena

and seven census-designated places:

- Helena Valley Northwest
- Helena Valley Northeast
- Helena Valley West Central
- Helena Valley Southeast
- Helena West Side
- Montana City
- Lakeside
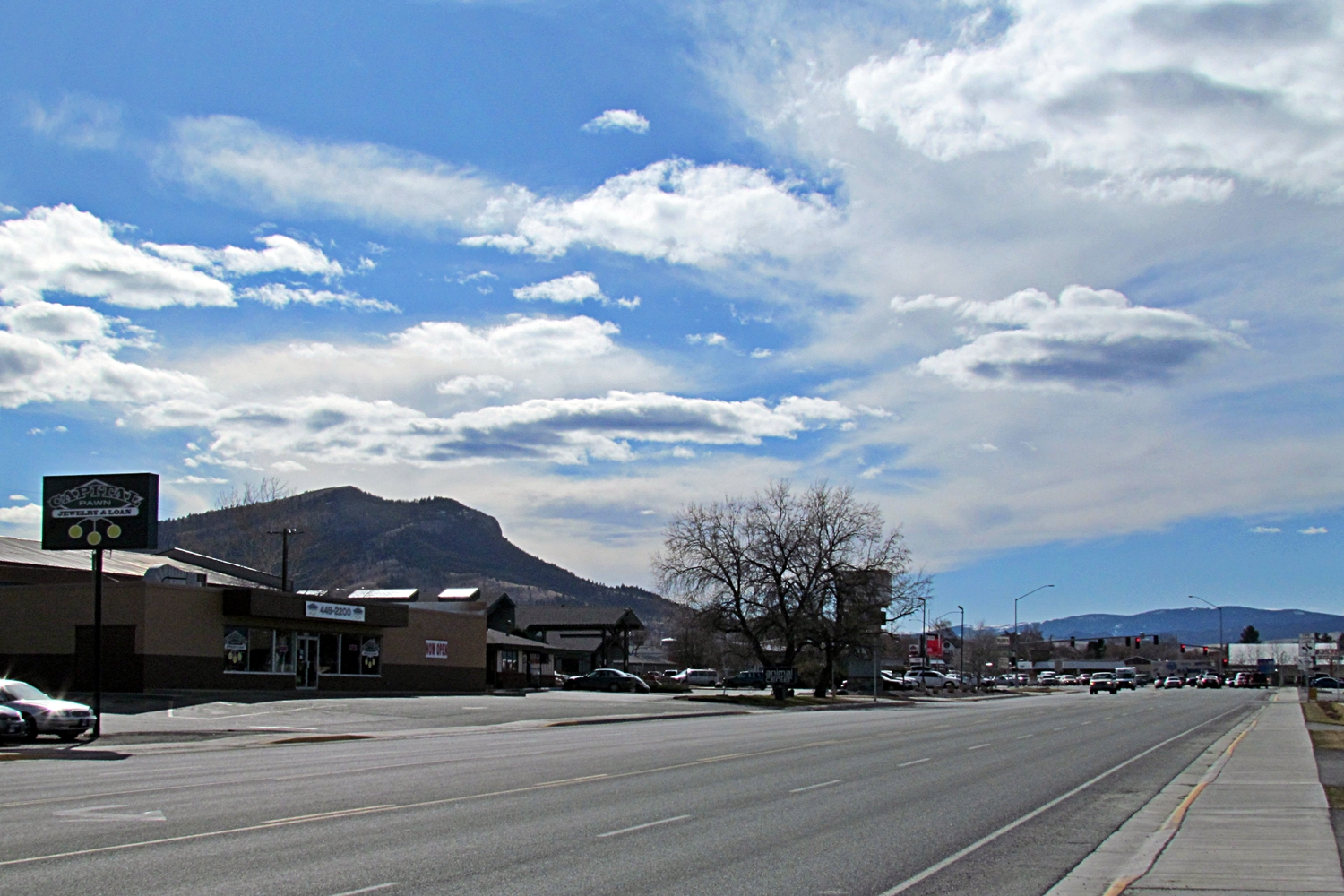
Helena, looking west on Cedar Street

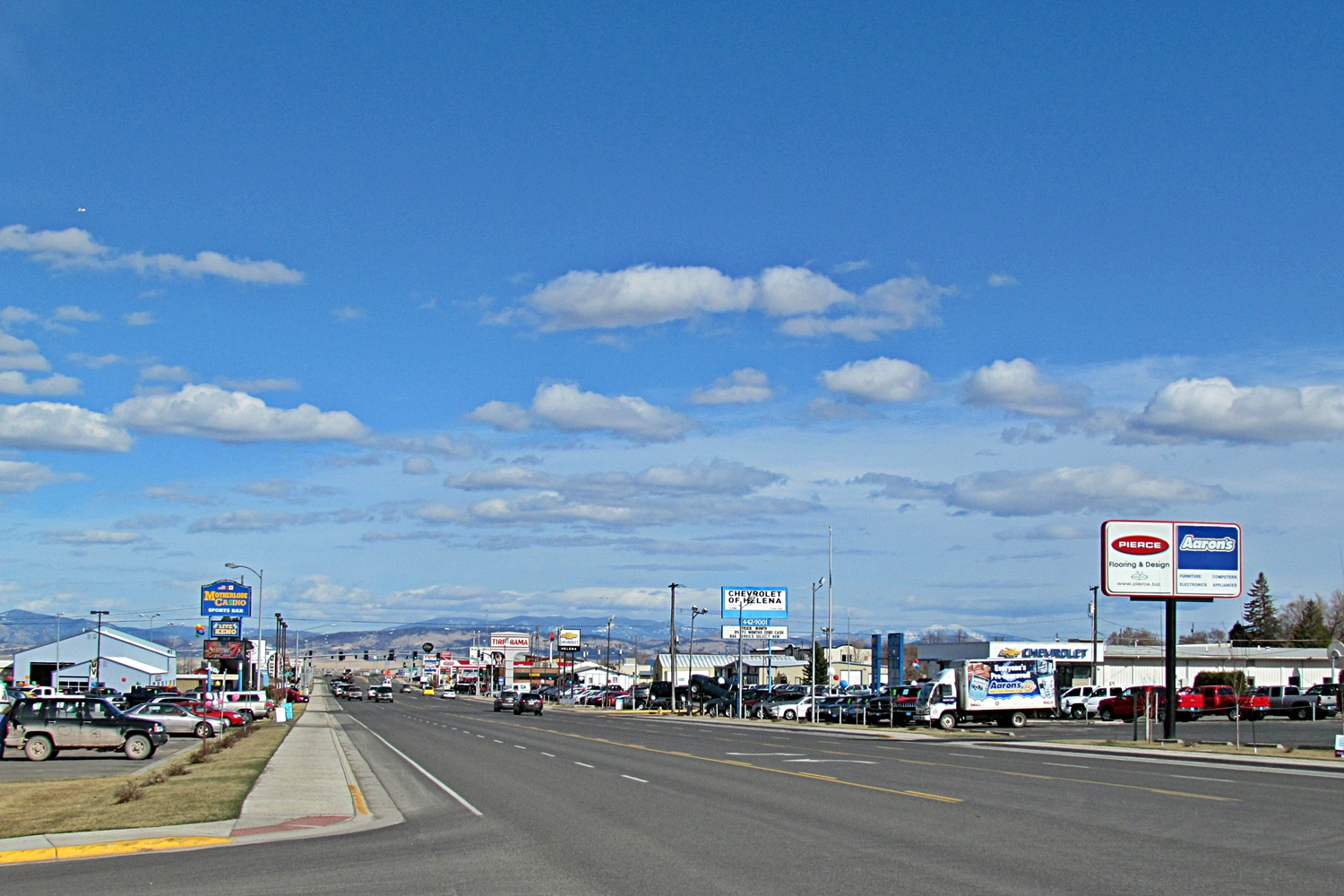
Helena, looking east on Cedar Street

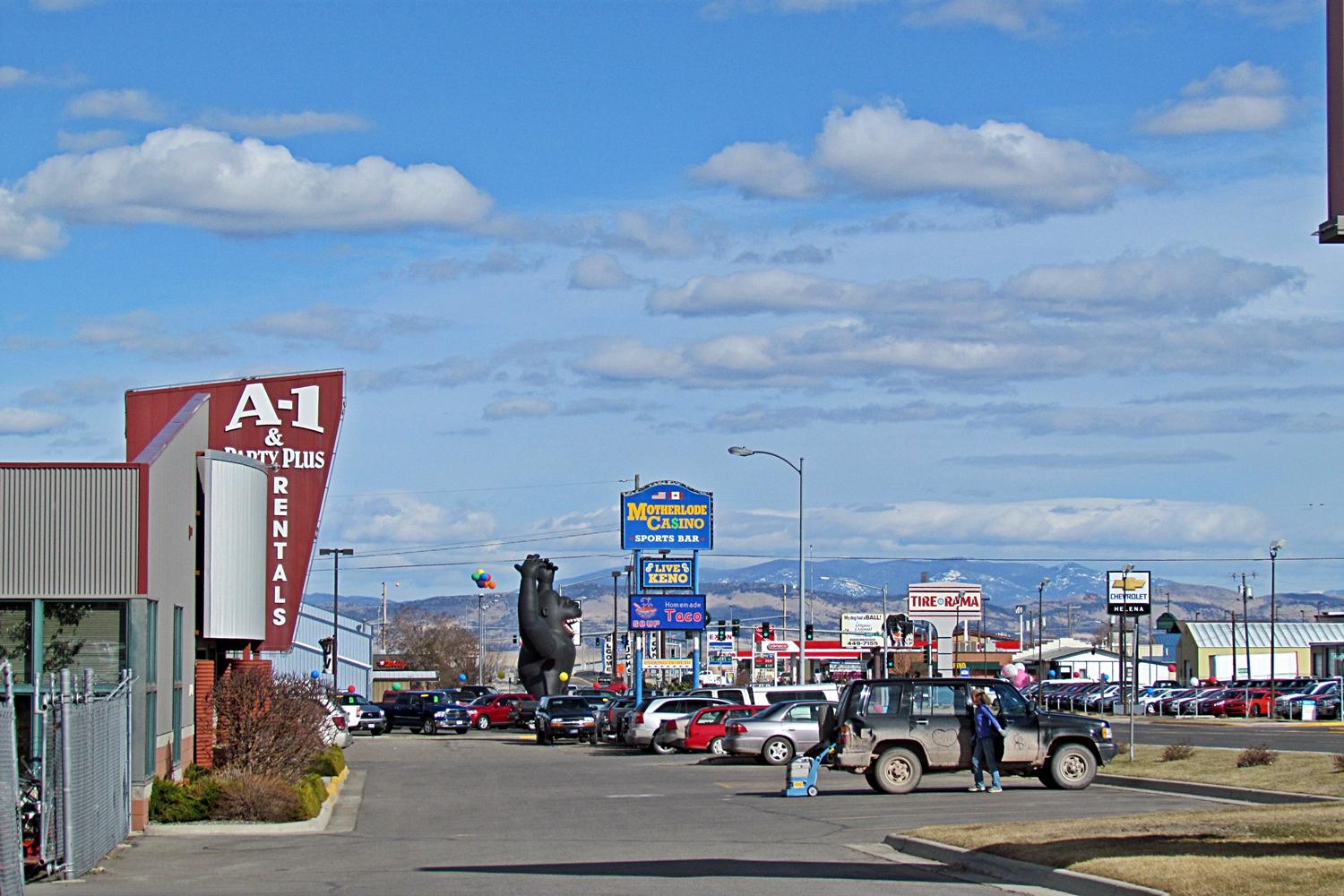
Helena, looking east from Roberts Street

== Natural features ==
=== Lakes ===
Aside from mountains and various rock formations, the Helena Valley contains many other natural features. To the northeast is Upper Holter Lake, also known as the Gates of the Mountains. The lake offers boat tours, hiking, camping, and other recreational opportunities. Also to the northeast is Lake Helena and Hauser Lake, which both offer plenty of recreational activities as well. Although not natural, the Helena Valley Reservoir is a reservoir on the east edge of the Helena Valley. The reservoir offers the same recreational opportunities as most lakes in the area. Additionally, although not in the valley, Canyon Ferry Lake is a major recreational spot to the southeast of the valley.

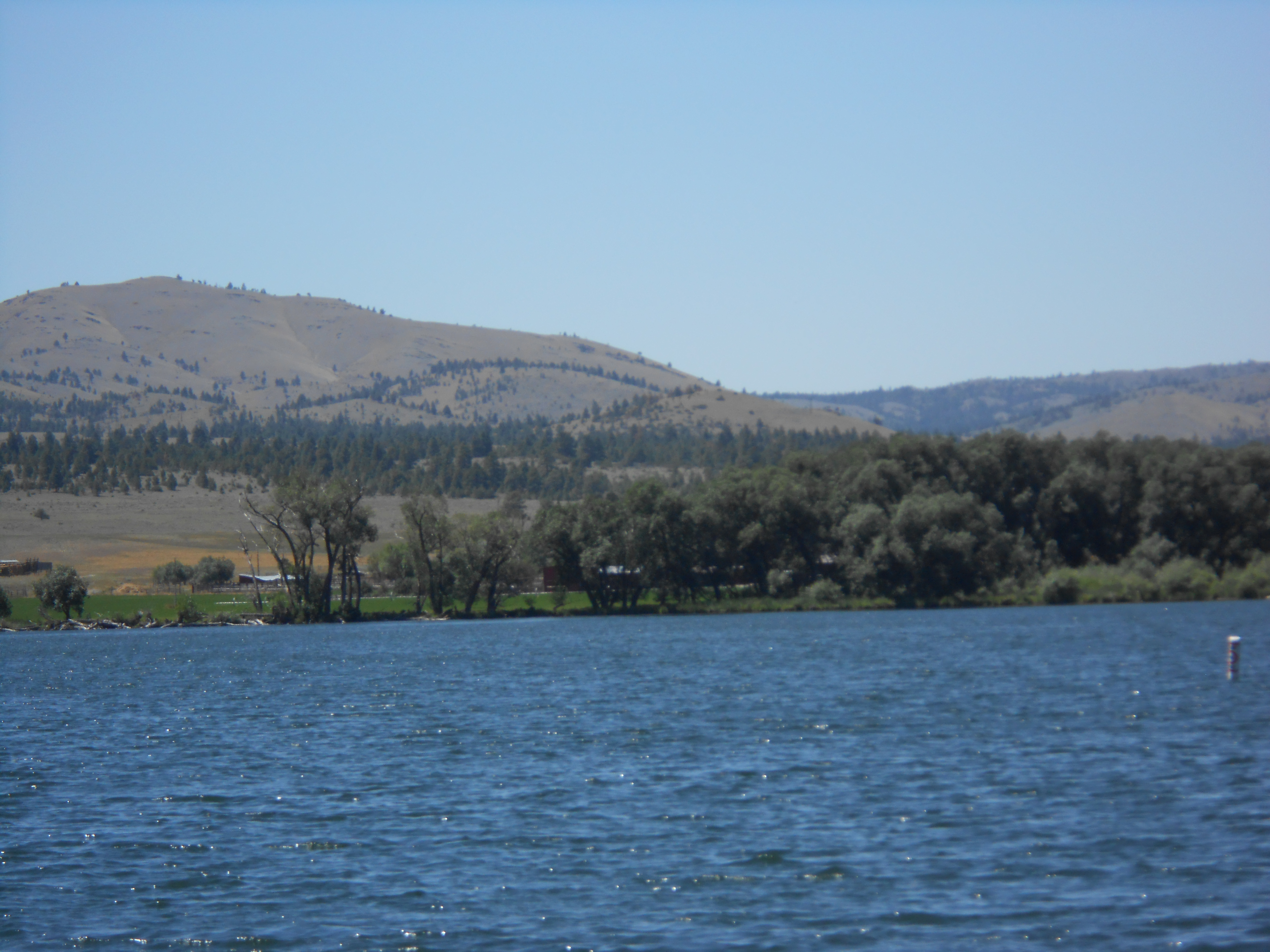
Upper Holter Lake

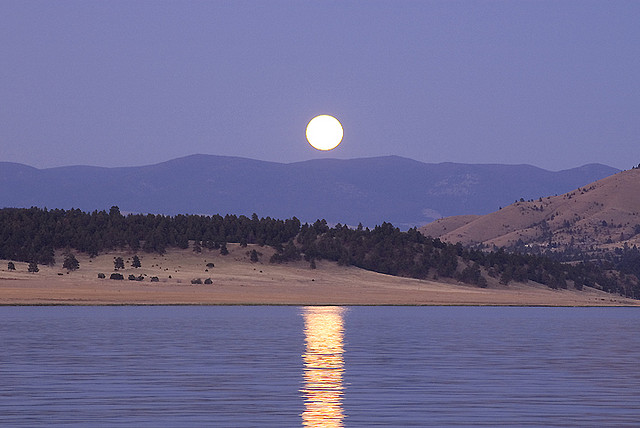
Hauser Lake

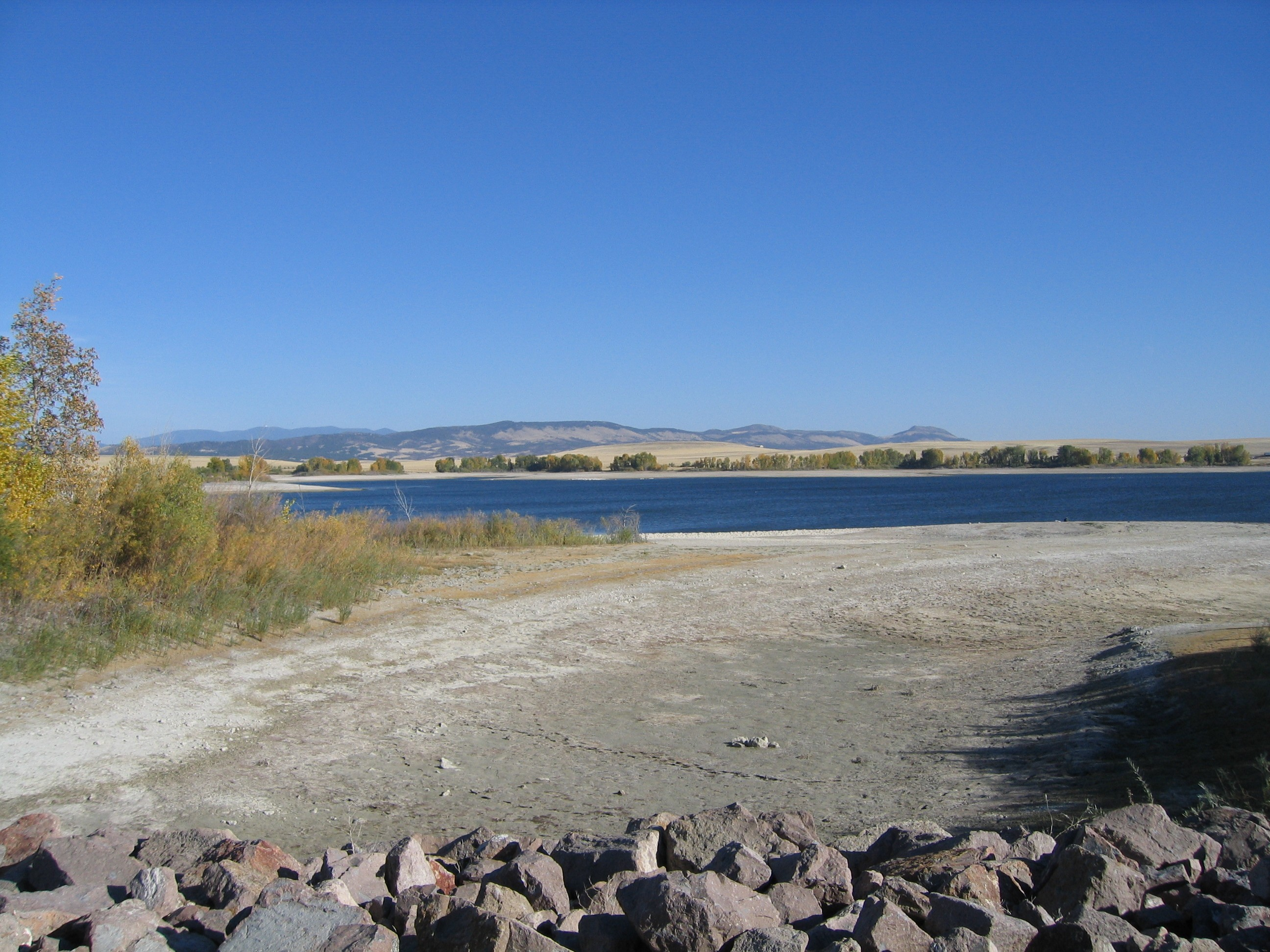
Helena Valley Reservoir

=== Rivers and streams ===
Supplying the water for Hauser Lake, the Holter Lakes, and Canyon Ferry Lake is the Missouri River. The Missouri River runs on the east edge of the Helena Valley. The river also receives water from Lake Helena, the Helena Valley Reservoir, and other small water features that flow through the valley. Also on the east edge of the Helena Valley is Prickly Pear Creek. The creek flows through East Helena and Helena Lake before emptying into the Missouri River. On the west side of the Helena Valley is Tenmile Creek, which flows through the edge of Helena and other communities before emptying into Prickly Pear Creek. Many other smaller creeks are in the Helena Valley, but are often on private land and offer little recreational access.

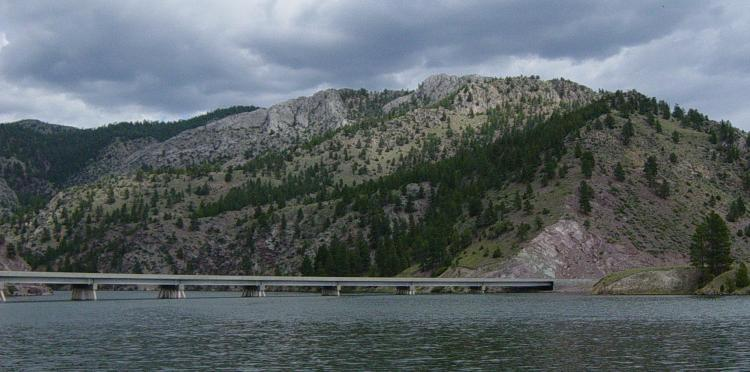
York-Trout Creek Bridge on the Missouri River near Helena

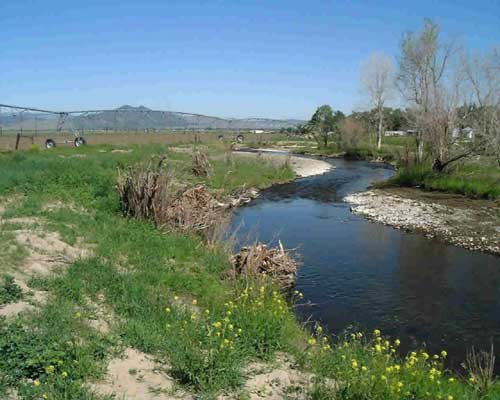
Prickly Pear Creek outside of Helena
