= List of mountains in Lewis and Clark County, Montana =

There are at least 149 named mountains in Lewis and Clark County, Montana.

- Allan Mountain, 47°33′42″N 112°48′07″W, el. 7,812 feet (2,381 m)
- Anaconda Hill, 47°02′48″N 112°20′13″W, el. 7,149 feet (2,179 m)
- Angle Point, 47°55′37″N 113°03′56″W, el. 7,953 feet (2,424 m)
- Ayres Peak, 47°25′05″N 113°02′01″W, el. 7,815 feet (2,382 m)
- Bald Butte, 46°43′14″N 112°20′32″W, el. 6,995 feet (2,132 m)
- Baldy Mountain, 46°54′16″N 112°37′58″W, el. 6,371 feet (1,942 m)
- Baldy Mountain, 46°49′51″N 112°07′39″W, el. 6,129 feet (1,868 m)
- Bear Den Mountain, 47°13′25″N 112°31′18″W, el. 6,844 feet (2,086 m)
- Beartooth Mountain, 46°53′48″N 111°58′16″W, el. 6,033 feet (1,839 m)
- Black Butte, 47°31′36″N 112°35′59″W, el. 5,115 feet (1,559 m)
- Black Mountain, 46°31′07″N 112°12′41″W, el. 7,136 feet (2,175 m)
- Black Mountain, 46°44′20″N 112°31′17″W, el. 8,297 feet (2,529 m)
- Black Rock, 47°14′49″N 112°09′20″W, el. 4,767 feet (1,453 m)
- Blowout Mountain, 47°11′24″N 112°27′38″W, el. 7,657 feet (2,334 m)
- Brewer Hill, 47°04′30″N 111°58′19″W, el. 3,517 feet (1,072 m)
- Bunyan Point, 47°23′08″N 112°51′00″W, el. 7,280 feet (2,220 m)
- Burn Top Mountain, 47°30′18″N 112°48′28″W, el. 7,474 feet (2,278 m)
- Butcher Mountain, 47°04′09″N 112°11′02″W, el. 5,364 feet (1,635 m)
- Candle Mountain, 46°53′38″N 111°47′01″W, el. 7,408 feet (2,258 m)
- Canyon Point, 47°13′42″N 113°01′11″W, el. 7,533 feet (2,296 m)
- Cap Mountain, 46°51′29″N 111°51′42″W, el. 6,722 feet (2,049 m)
- Carey Butte, 47°30′17″N 112°27′20″W, el. 4,564 feet (1,391 m)
- Caribou Peak, 47°11′18″N 112°34′25″W, el. 8,737 feet (2,663 m)
- Cemetery Hill, 46°38′03″N 111°42′23″W, el. 3,812 feet (1,162 m)
- Cigarette Rock, 47°21′58″N 112°51′06″W, el. 8,235 feet (2,510 m)
- Coburn Mountain, 47°08′40″N 112°01′22″W, el. 5,105 feet (1,556 m)
- Colorado Mountain, 46°30′14″N 112°12′30″W, el. 7,218 feet (2,200 m)
- Comb Rock, 47°13′50″N 112°10′17″W, el. 4,291 feet (1,308 m)
- Concord Mountain, 47°17′29″N 113°00′22″W, el. 6,916 feet (2,108 m)
- Copper Butte, 46°47′11″N 112°01′05″W, el. 4,980 feet (1,520 m)
- Crater Mountain, 46°55′27″N 112°30′22″W, el. 7,123 feet (2,171 m)
- Crown Mountain, 47°22′48″N 112°46′00″W, el. 8,340 feet (2,540 m)
- Cyanide Mountain, 47°25′15″N 112°45′38″W, el. 7,825 feet (2,385 m)
- Dalton Mountain, 46°50′51″N 112°42′58″W, el. 6,768 feet (2,063 m)
- Danaher Mountain, 47°16′02″N 113°02′44″W, el. 8,041 feet (2,451 m)
- Deadman Hill, 47°31′53″N 112°57′20″W, el. 7,336 feet (2,236 m)
- Denton Mountain, 47°04′17″N 112°16′38″W, el. 6,132 feet (1,869 m)
- Devils Tower, 46°47′08″N 111°50′22″W, el. 5,095 feet (1,553 m)
- Dreadnaught Hill, 46°40′15″N 112°13′30″W, el. 5,292 feet (1,613 m)
- Drumlummon Hill, 46°44′28″N 112°17′37″W, el. 6,302 feet (1,921 m)
- Edward Mountain, 46°45′48″N 112°18′42″W, el. 6,716 feet (2,047 m)
- Electric Mountain, 47°06′05″N 112°06′15″W, el. 5,279 feet (1,609 m)
- Elephant Head, 47°36′46″N 112°50′26″W, el. 5,328 feet (1,624 m)
- Elephant Mountain, 47°12′20″N 112°04′57″W, el. 4,587 feet (1,398 m)
- Evans Peak, 47°16′17″N 112°52′32″W, el. 8,845 feet (2,696 m)
- Fairview Mountain, 47°28′57″N 112°45′02″W, el. 8,241 feet (2,512 m)
- Falls Point, 47°13′16″N 112°54′21″W, el. 7,520 feet (2,290 m)
- Flint Mountain, 47°20′22″N 112°54′47″W, el. 9,019 feet (2,749 m)
- French Bar Mountain, 46°38′24″N 111°44′14″W, el. 4,557 feet (1,389 m)
- Galusha Peak, 47°12′25″N 112°47′27″W, el. 8,504 feet (2,592 m)
- Gilman Hill, 47°31′48″N 112°22′18″W, el. 4,226 feet (1,288 m)
- Gobblers Knob, 47°17′28″N 112°19′12″W, el. 5,059 feet (1,542 m)
- Goon Hill, 46°39′09″N 111°43′30″W, el. 4,111 feet (1,253 m)
- Granite Butte, 46°51′47″N 112°27′53″W, el. 7,588 feet (2,313 m)
- Grassy Hills, 47°16′08″N 112°40′29″W, el. 6,611 feet (2,015 m)
- Green Mountain, 47°07′37″N 112°25′28″W, el. 7,444 feet (2,269 m)
- Greenhorn Mountain, 46°41′43″N 112°18′47″W, el. 7,510 feet (2,290 m)
- Hahn Peak, 47°49′46″N 113°04′09″W, el. 8,291 feet (2,527 m)
- Halfmoon Peak, 47°20′58″N 112°48′17″W, el. 8,100 feet (2,500 m)
- Haystack Butte, 47°23′56″N 112°32′58″W, el. 6,788 feet (2,069 m)
- Hedges Mountain, 46°44′06″N 111°38′52″W, el. 7,103 feet (2,165 m)
- Hogback Mountain, 46°49′35″N 111°42′37″W, el. 7,805 feet (2,379 m)
- Horse Mountain, 47°20′17″N 112°36′29″W, el. 6,368 feet (1,941 m)
- Jackson Peak, 46°57′36″N 111°59′37″W, el. 5,102 feet (1,555 m)
- Joes Mountain, 47°08′12″N 112°16′28″W, el. 5,892 feet (1,796 m)
- Johnson Mountain, 47°09′40″N 112°16′36″W, el. 5,919 feet (1,804 m)
- Junction Mountain, 47°30′57″N 113°07′23″W, el. 8,691 feet (2,649 m)
- Kevan Mountain, 47°54′35″N 113°05′25″W, el. 8,323 feet (2,537 m)
- Lannigan Mountain, 47°04′15″N 112°12′32″W, el. 5,394 feet (1,644 m)
- Lee Mountain, 46°27′57″N 112°16′37″W, el. 7,047 feet (2,148 m)
- Lick Mountain, 47°50′57″N 113°01′43″W, el. 7,667 feet (2,337 m)
- Limekiln Mountain, 47°07′39″N 112°13′01″W, el. 5,367 feet (1,636 m)
- Lone Chief Mountain, 47°19′15″N 112°34′37″W, el. 6,371 feet (1,942 m)
- Lone Mountain, 47°06′49″N 112°36′30″W, el. 6,749 feet (2,057 m)
- Long Point, 46°56′45″N 112°47′17″W, el. 5,128 feet (1,563 m)
- Lookout Mountain, 47°47′31″N 113°01′36″W, el. 8,159 feet (2,487 m)
- Luttrell Peak, 46°25′58″N 112°16′50″W, el. 7,723 feet (2,354 m)
- McCarty Hill, 47°27′58″N 112°41′14″W, el. 6,165 feet (1,879 m)
- Meyer Hill, 47°30′31″N 112°18′35″W, el. 4,163 feet (1,269 m)
- Meyers Hill, 46°43′27″N 112°27′31″W, el. 7,129 feet (2,173 m)
- Middleman Mountain, 46°48′19″N 111°40′58″W, el. 7,503 feet (2,287 m)
- Midnight Hill, 47°03′17″N 112°22′06″W, el. 6,060 feet (1,850 m)
- Mitchell Mountain, 46°56′34″N 112°14′30″W, el. 7,021 feet (2,140 m)
- Monitor Mountain, 47°13′36″N 112°32′25″W, el. 7,716 feet (2,352 m)
- Moonlight Peak, 47°52′35″N 113°01′32″W, el. 8,071 feet (2,460 m)
- Moore Hill, 47°05′28″N 112°03′45″W, el. 4,088 feet (1,246 m)
- Moors Mountain, 46°53′30″N 111°44′21″W, el. 7,979 feet (2,432 m)
- Mount Ascension, 46°34′08″N 112°01′44″W, el. 5,262 feet (1,604 m)
- Mount Belmont, 46°44′53″N 112°19′54″W, el. 7,323 feet (2,232 m)
- Mount Helena, 46°35′16″N 112°03′55″W, el. 5,433 feet (1,656 m)
- Mount Rowe, 47°04′46″N 111°51′50″W, el. 4,997 feet (1,523 m)
- Observation Point, 47°20′45″N 112°56′01″W, el. 8,507 feet (2,593 m)
- Old Baldy Mountain, 46°24′55″N 112°16′11″W, el. 8,195 feet (2,498 m)
- Olson Peak, 47°13′01″N 112°45′43″W, el. 8,825 feet (2,690 m)
- Painted Hill, 47°07′52″N 112°12′08″W, el. 5,187 feet (1,581 m)
- Patrol Mountain, 47°27′01″N 112°53′32″W, el. 7,936 feet (2,419 m)
- Pyramid Peak, 47°11′48″N 112°44′33″W, el. 8,684 feet (2,647 m)
- Rabbit Butte, 47°50′53″N 112°58′11″W, el. 6,361 feet (1,939 m)
- Rattlesnake Mountain, 46°49′12″N 112°01′25″W, el. 4,934 feet (1,504 m)
- Red Butte, 47°35′26″N 113°06′35″W, el. 8,576 feet (2,614 m)
- Red Hill, 47°28′27″N 112°47′19″W, el. 7,175 feet (2,187 m)
- Red Mountain, 46°27′39″N 112°13′26″W, el. 8,143 feet (2,482 m)
- Red Mountain, 47°07′00″N 112°44′19″W, el. 9,403 feet (2,866 m)
- Red Mountain, 47°09′46″N 112°26′33″W, el. 7,254 feet (2,211 m)
- Red Slide Mountain, 47°20′53″N 112°46′12″W, el. 7,690 feet (2,340 m)
- Redhead Peak, 47°44′46″N 113°05′24″W, el. 8,776 feet (2,675 m)
- Renshaw Mountain, 47°30′48″N 112°49′55″W, el. 8,261 feet (2,518 m)
- Roberts Mountain, 47°05′48″N 112°14′25″W, el. 6,411 feet (1,954 m)
- Rogers Mountain, 47°00′14″N 112°11′53″W, el. 6,926 feet (2,111 m)
- Roost Hill, 47°30′41″N 112°40′22″W, el. 6,739 feet (2,054 m)
- Roundtop Mountain, 46°43′15″N 112°22′12″W, el. 6,916 feet (2,108 m)
- Sacajawea Mountain, 46°52′20″N 111°51′54″W, el. 6,522 feet (1,988 m)
- Sandy Butte, 47°29′51″N 112°29′04″W, el. 4,613 feet (1,406 m)
- Sawtooth Mountain, 46°50′36″N 111°47′57″W, el. 5,909 feet (1,801 m)
- Scapegoat Mountain, 47°18′36″N 112°49′45″W, el. 9,186 feet (2,800 m)
- Scarlet Mountain, 47°27′58″N 113°00′50″W, el. 8,130 feet (2,480 m)
- Scratchgravel Hills, 46°40′35″N 112°05′04″W, el. 5,233 feet (1,595 m)
- Sentinel Mountain, 47°23′06″N 113°03′09″W, el. 6,942 feet (2,116 m)
- Sheep Mountain, 46°51′29″N 111°45′20″W, el. 7,356 feet (2,242 m)
- Sheep Mountain, 47°19′41″N 112°31′02″W, el. 6,686 feet (2,038 m)
- Sheep Mountain, 47°38′36″N 112°56′31″W, el. 8,012 feet (2,442 m)
- Sheep Sheds, 47°31′22″N 112°47′51″W, el. 7,618 feet (2,322 m)
- Signal Mountain, 47°53′58″N 113°02′13″W, el. 8,222 feet (2,506 m)
- Silver King Mountain, 47°06′53″N 112°31′41″W, el. 7,775 feet (2,370 m)
- Slategoat Mountain, 47°40′28″N 113°00′09″W, el. 8,881 feet (2,707 m)
- Steamboat Mountain, 47°17′11″N 112°33′47″W, el. 8,287 feet (2,526 m)
- Stemwinder Hill, 46°37′35″N 112°08′38″W, el. 4,580 feet (1,400 m)
- Stonewall Mountain, 47°02′36″N 112°42′14″W, el. 8,268 feet (2,520 m)
- Stony Point, 46°51′14″N 111°56′53″W, el. 5,528 feet (1,685 m)
- Sugar Loaf, 47°31′05″N 112°43′37″W, el. 6,079 feet (1,853 m)
- Sugarloaf Mountain, 47°12′58″N 112°24′18″W, el. 6,283 feet (1,915 m)
- Sugarloaf Mountain, 47°24′16″N 112°56′45″W, el. 8,642 feet (2,634 m)
- Sun Butte, 47°38′06″N 112°51′54″W, el. 5,646 feet (1,721 m)
- Sunrise Hill, 47°10′33″N 112°20′34″W, el. 5,600 feet (1,700 m)
- Sunset Hill, 47°10′37″N 112°21′20″W, el. 5,791 feet (1,765 m)
- Sunset Mountain, 47°05′41″N 112°20′02″W, el. 6,539 feet (1,993 m)
- Table Mountain, 47°15′02″N 112°27′01″W, el. 7,132 feet (2,174 m)
- The Twin Sisters, 47°06′13″N 111°51′11″W, el. 4,167 feet (1,270 m)
- Three Sisters, 47°46′23″N 113°04′58″W, el. 8,894 feet (2,711 m)
- Timber Hill, 47°03′05″N 111°49′48″W, el. 5,115 feet (1,559 m)
- Toms Peak, 47°01′55″N 112°12′44″W, el. 6,001 feet (1,829 m)
- Trident Peaks, 47°20′58″N 112°58′10″W, el. 7,605 feet (2,318 m)
- Trinity Hill, 46°46′29″N 112°17′12″W, el. 5,846 feet (1,782 m)
- Twin Buttes, 47°15′06″N 112°31′15″W, el. 7,474 feet (2,278 m)
- Twin Peaks, 47°29′23″N 113°03′33″W, el. 8,740 feet (2,660 m)
- Ursus Hill, 47°22′05″N 113°01′21″W, el. 6,968 feet (2,124 m)
- War Eagle Hill, 46°38′18″N 112°12′36″W, el. 5,007 feet (1,526 m)
- Willow Mountain, 46°53′41″N 111°50′24″W, el. 7,169 feet (2,185 m)
- Wolf Creek Hill, 47°02′05″N 112°07′36″W, el. 3,884 feet (1,184 m)

== See also ==
- List of mountains in Montana
- List of mountain ranges in Montana
