= Fairview Mountain =

Fairview Mountain may refer to several places:

- Fairview Mountain (Alberta) in Alberta, Canada
- Fairview Mountain in Lewis and Clark County, Montana
