= Tenmile Creek (Lewis and Clark County, Montana) =

- Location of the headwaters of Tenmile Creek in Lewis and Clark County, Montana

Location
- Country: United States
- State: Montana
- County: Lewis and Clark County

Physical characteristics
- Source
  - location: East side of the Continental Divide in southern Lewis and Clark County, Montana
  - coordinates: 46°25′36.7392″N 112°18′50.3706″W
  - elevation: 7,120 ft (2,170 m)
- Mouth: Prickly Pear Creek
  - location: Lewis and Clark County, Montana
  - coordinates: 46°40′24.5382″N 111°58′32.973″W
  - elevation: 3,663 ft (1,116 m)
- Length: 26.5 mi (42.6 km)
- Basin size: 200 sq mi (520 km^{2})

Tenmile Creek is a 26.5-mile (42.6 km) long tributary of Prickly Pear Creek, located in southern Lewis and Clark County in the state of Montana in the United States. Although somewhat polluted by abandoned mines and mine tailings in its upper watershed, Tenmile Creek supplies about half the water for the city of Helena, the state capitol.

== Location and flows ==
Tenmile Creek rises near the top of the Continental Divide on the east slopes of the Rocky Mountains, specifically the Lewis and Clark Range. The upper watershed consists of steep, forested mountain slopes. The lower watershed consists of the final 5 miles (8.0 km) of the stream, which travels over prairie and through residential and retail developments in and near the city of Helena, Montana before reaching its outlet at Prickly Pear Creek. Lake Helena is only 1.5 miles (2.4 km) downstream from the confluence of Tenmile Creek and Prickly Pear Creek.

Tenmile Creek is a typical mountain stream. Water flows are heaviest in late spring and early summer, when snowmelt and spring rains are heaviest.

Land uses in the upper watershed consist of outdoor recreation and timber harvesting. The town of Rimini, Montana, (37 homes) is located in the upper watershed, as is a small residential subdivision ("Landmark"), and a few scattered single-family homes and recreational cabins. The lower watershed is used primarily for farm land, ranching, and urban residential and retail development. Irrigation, primarily for farmland, draws heavily on water in Tenmile Creek, leaving the stream dry at points. But some or most of this water returns to the stream through runoff and seepage.

== Superfund site ==
Hard rock mining was common in the upper watershed from about 1870 into the 1990s. The upper 13 miles (21 km) of the stream is located within the Upper Tenmile Creek National Priorities List, a federal Superfund site about 53 square miles (140 km^{2}) in size. Arsenic, cadmium, copper, lead, nitrate, phosphorus, and zinc are released into the stream when water flows over or through mines or mine tailings and reaches Tenmile Creek. At times, water in the creek contains levels of arsenic, cadmium, and lead which exceed State of Montana limits for safe human consumption, and water treatment is needed to render the water safe to drink and use. As of 2012, there were 150 abandoned or inactive mines in the upper watershed. Reclamation activity began in 1996 and was expected to be complete in 2012.

Between 2002 and 2010, the United States Environmental Protection Agency and the state of Montana spent almost $87.5 million ($129,187,014 in 2025 dollars) in designing and constructing remediation plants and contaminated soil repositories, remediation projects, reclamation, and removal of contaminated soil.

== City of Helena drinking water supply ==
Tenmile Creek provides the city of Helena with about 50 percent of its drinking water. Water was first diverted to city use in the 1880s by the Helena Water Works Company, which constructed a 4.8-mile (7.7 km) system of wood flumes and trestles to bring water to local residents. The city of Helena purchased the flume system in 1911 and continues to maintain it into the 21st century. The city owns first and second Prior-appropriation water rights for a total of 550 miner's inches of the streamflow, amounting to about 8.9 million gallons of water per day.

The city also built and maintains Chessman Reservoir and Scott Reservoir near the stream's headwaters, which retain excess water during periods of high precipitation, and release this water during periods of high demand (usually later summer and fall when stream flow is low). Nearly all the water in Tenmile Creek is diverted by underground pipeline to the Tenmile Water Treatment Plant located on Rimini Road west of Helena.

In 2011, the city of Helena and local landowners sued one another over how much water the city was permitted to take from Tenmile Creek. Landowners argued that the city was taking too much water from the stream. They also argued that the city should take more water from the nearby Missouri River so that Tenmile Creek could sustain greater flows. The following year, the Bates Land Company put 1,212 acre-feet (1,495,000 kl) of Tenmile Creek water up for sale for $9.6 million ($13,462,821 in 2025 dollars). The water rights were third in line. The company offered the water rights to the city of Helena for just $1 million ($1,402,377 in 2025 dollars), but the city said its Tenmile Water Treatment Plant could not accommodate the extra inflows.

Fire is a serious threat to Helena's water supply. Fire could not only destroy the nearly 140-year-old wooden flume system that brings Tenmile Creek water to the city, but loss of forest and undergrowth would create immense erosion that would pollute Tenmile Creek and render it unusable for human use for as long as five years. Between 2000 and 2008, the city of Helena spent about $415,000 ($620,576 in 2025 dollars) to create a 432-foot (132 m) wide vegetationless buffer zone on either side of portions of the flume to reduce the likelihood of fire damage. But with much of the flume running through the Helena National Forest, the city needs the permission of the National Forest Service to do additional work. The Tenmile Watershed Collaborative Committee was formed in 2008 to develop recommendations to address issues in the watershed, including fire alleviation, but no action had been taken on its recommendations as of 2013.

== Fishery ==
Tenmile Creek's ability to support a viable fishery is severely limited by both high concentrations of deadly elements in the water and the minimal or nonexistent water flows during certain parts of the year. The stream currently has no significant fish populations anywhere in its watershed.

== See also ==
- Lake Helena
- List of Montana rivers
