= Prickly Pear Creek =

Stream in Montana, USA

Prickly Pear Creek Pryor Creek
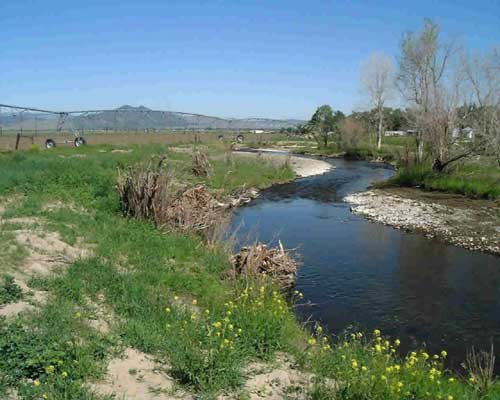
- Etymology: Prickly Pear cacti in the area

Location
- Country: United States
- State: Montana

Physical characteristics
- Source: Rabbit Gulch
  - location: 46.34311°N 111.90452°W
- 2nd source: Black Canyon
  - coordinates: 46.35484°N 111.96584°W
- 3rd source: Weimer Creek
  - coordinates: 46.36221°N 111.9853°W
- 4th source: Anderson Gulch
  - coordinates: 46.36242°N 111.98770°W
- 5th source: Golconda Creek
  - coordinates: 46.36610°N 112.00759°W
- Mouth: Missouri River
  - coordinates: 46.74512°N 111.88163°W
- Length: 43.5 m (143 ft)

Basin features
- River system: Missouri River
- Cities: Helena, Montana

Prickly Pear Creek is a stream in Montana. The creek is located in Jefferson and Lewis and Clark counties, and offers fishing floating, and other recreational activities.

== Stream Course ==
Prickly Pear Creek begins its course in the Elkhorn Mountains south of Helena. The creek then continues north flowing under I-15. It then joins Beavertown Creek and Spring Creek and flows into Jefferson City. Afterwards, it follows the route of the interstate and flows through Clancy, Montana City, and East Helena. It continues, going under US-12, and flows northwest by Helena Valley Southwest and the Helena Regional Airport. The stream then flows north and then northeast forming Lake Helena. It then ends its course, flowing out of the lake into the Missouri River.

== History ==
The creek was first discovered and documented by the members of the Lewis and Clark Expedition on July 19, 1805. The expedition named the creek Pryor Creek after Sergeant Nathaniel Pryor, although the name changed in the 1860s by locals to Prickly Pear Creek due to the abundance of Prickly Pear Cacti in the Helena Valley. During the discovery, William Clark noted in his journal, "a butifull creek... which manders into a butifull Vallie of great extent."

In the 1910s with the rise of agriculture in the valley, irrigation was pumped out of the creek, and the Prickly Pear Valley Irrigation Project was formed to manage water usage. The project expanded in the 1950s, with a major addition of water being pumped from the Helena Regulating Reservoir. In 1995, the Prickly Pear Land Trust was formed to protect land near the creek. The trust has completed several projects since, most recently in 2011 to protect and restore land originally owned by the American Smelting and Refining Company. The Prickly Pear Land Trust currently protects 31,000 acres, and the Prickly Pear Valley Irrigation Project irrigates 10,000 acres.

== Species ==
The stream contains 9 total species of fish, with 5 being native to the state. The fish species are the Brook Trout, Brown Trout, Longnose Dace, Longnose Sucker, Mottled Sculpin, Rainbow Trout, Walleye, Westslope Cutthroat Trout, and the White Sucker.

== Extremities ==
Prickly Pear Creek has had one major flood that occurred in East Helena during May 1981. The creek also had minor flooding during years of excessive rainfall, most recently in June 2023.

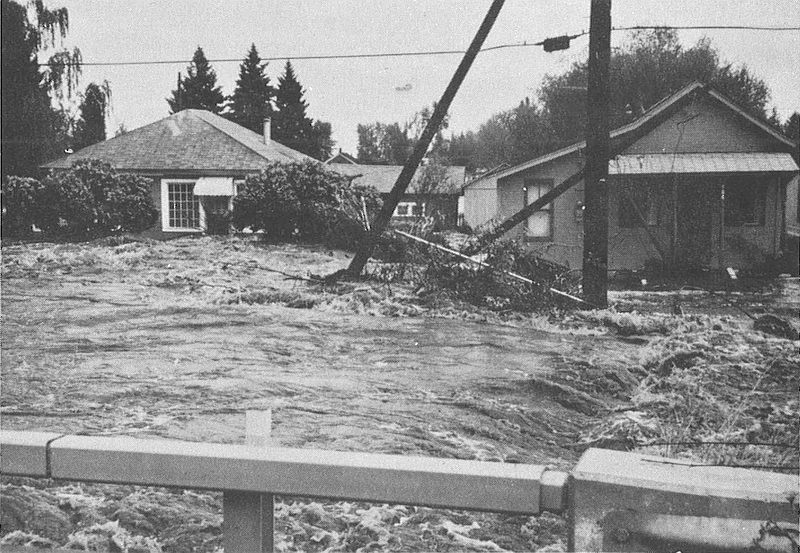
an image of Prickly Pear Creek flooding East Helena during May 1981
