= Scratchgravel Hills =

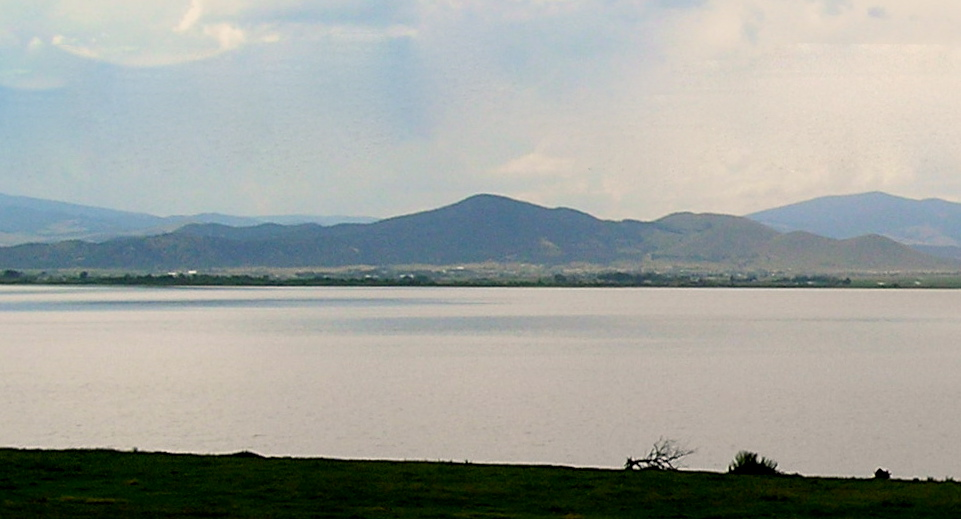
- Scratchgravel Hills as viewed from Lake Helena

Highest point
- Elevation: 5,233 feet (1,595 m)
- Coordinates: 46°40′35″N 112°05′04″W

Geography
- Location within Montana
- Location: Lewis and Clark County, Montana

The Scratchgravel Hills, el. 5,233 feet (1,595 m) are a small summit of hills northwest of Helena in Lewis and Clark County, Montana. The area has seen increased development and a drop in water level in recent years. The Scratchgravel Hills have alluvial deposits on top of faulted granitic bedrock. There was extensive mining in the area in late 1800s through the 1930s. The northern part of the region has folding shale, sandstone and limestone from the Algonkian (Belt) age. Adjacent granite has altered them into quartz-mica schist and related rocks. The southern and central portions of the region contains quartz monzonite. Bitterroot and conifers are common in the area.

== See also ==
- List of mountains in Lewis and Clark County, Montana
- List of mountains in Montana
