= Deadman Hill =

Mountain in the American state of Utah

- Location within Utah

Highest point
- Elevation: 6,051 ft (1,844 m) NAVD 88
- Coordinates: 38°20′04″N 110°21′12″W

Geography
- Location: Wayne County, Utah, U.S.
- Topo map: USGS Robbers Roost Flats

Deadman Hill is a summit in Wayne County, Utah, in the United States. It is located about 19.5 miles (31.4 km) east of Hanksville, Utah, and 28 miles (45 km) west-northwest of the confluence of the Green and the Colorado rivers in Canyonlands National Park.

Deadman Hill marks the spot where a young fugitive was buried after being shot by vigilantes.
