= Stonewall Mountain =

Mountain in Nye County, Nevada, USA

Coordinates: 37°30′00″N 117°02′24″W

Stonewall Mountain is a summit in the U.S. state of Nevada. The elevation is 8,300 feet (2,500 m).

Stonewall Mountain was named after Stonewall Jackson (1824–1863), American Civil War Confederate general.
