= Cigarette Rock =

Summit in Montana, United States

Coordinates: 47°21′58″N 112°51′06″W

Cigarette Rock is a summit in Lewis and Clark County, Montana, in the United States. With an elevation of 8,235 feet (2,510 m), Cigarette Rock is the 799th highest summit in Montana.
