= Scott Reservoir =

Waterbody in Navajo County, Arizona

- Location within Arizona
- Location: Navajo County, Arizona, United States
- Coordinates: 34°10′27.03″N 109°57′29.57″W
- Type: Reservoir
- Basin countries: United States
- Surface area: 80 acres (32 ha)
- Average depth: 10 ft (3.0 m)
- Surface elevation: 6,720 ft (2,050 m)

Built in 1928, Scott Reservoir is an irrigation impoundment on Porter Creek near Pinetop-Lakeside, Arizona, USA. The least developed of the "in town" lakes, trees surround Scott Reservoir. It lies just outside the town limits on the Apache-Sitgreaves National Forests.

== Description ==
Scott Reservoir covers 80 acres (32 ha) with an average depth of 10 feet (3.0 m), and lies at 6,720 feet (2,050 m) altitude. It is usually somewhat turbid, which helps control algae blooms and aquatic weeds. This, coupled with a perennial stream flowing in, creates a stable water quality condition. The lake is stocked with catchable-sized rainbow trout in spring, early summer and fall, and it is occasionally stocked with channel catfish. There are also some largemouth bass.

== Fish species ==
- Rainbow
- Largemouth Bass
- Sunfish
- Catfish (Channel)
