= Willow Creek Reservoir (Elko County, Nevada) =

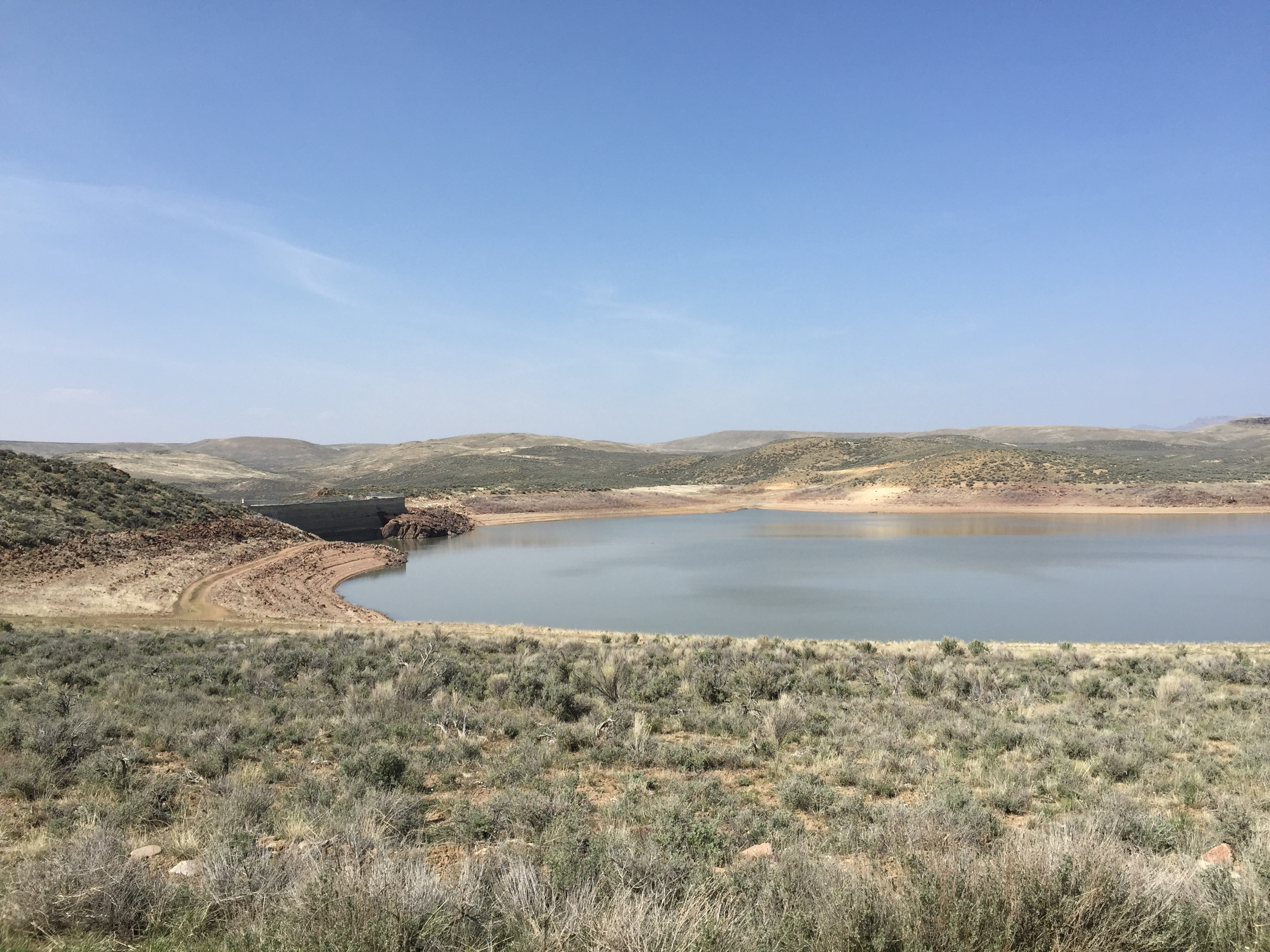
- Lower portion of Willow Creek Reservoir

- Location of Willow Creek Reservoir in Nevada
- Location: Elko County, Nevada
- Coordinates: 41°13′13″N 116°31′21″W
- Type: Reservoir
- Primary inflows: Willow Creek
- Primary outflows: Willow Creek
- Basin countries: United States
- Surface area: 640 acres (2.6 km^{2})
- Max. depth: 40 ft (12 m)
- Water volume: 10,000 acre⋅ft (12,000,000 m^{3})
- Surface elevation: 5,400 ft (1,600 m)

Willow Creek Reservoir is a man-made lake in Elko County, Nevada in the United States. The reservoir was initially created in 1884 by the construction of Willow Creek Dam. Barrick Goldstrike owns the reservoir. The reservoir impounds the Willow Creek for irrigation storage.
