= Lake Helena =

Lake in Montana, United States

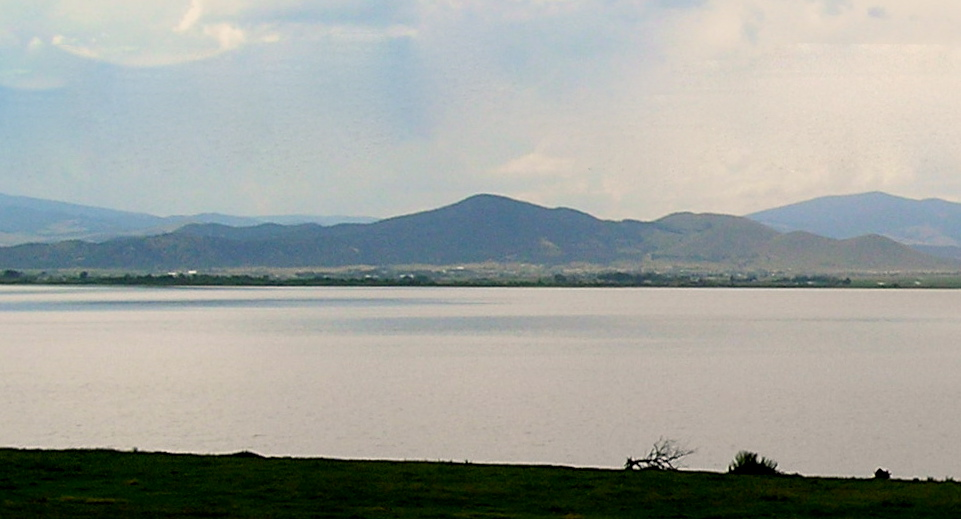
- East side of Lake Helena, looking west toward the Scratchgravel Hills

- Location within Montana Location within the United States
- Location: Lewis and Clark County, Montana
- Coordinates: 46°42′10″N 111°54′07″W
- Basin countries: United States
- Surface area: 2,073 acres (8.39 km^{2})
- Max. depth: 14 ft (4.3 m)
- Surface elevation: 3,647 ft (1,112 m)

Lake Helena is a body of water along Prickly Pear Creek in the Helena Valley of Lewis and Clark County in southwestern Montana. It is 2,073 acres (8 km^{2}) in size and is 3,647 ft (1,112 m) above sea level.

== History ==
Completion of Hauser Dam on the Missouri River in 1907 created Hauser Lake. In addition, it created an arm of the lake, flooding 8 miles (13 km) of Prickly Pear Creek and surrounding wetlands to form Lake Helena.

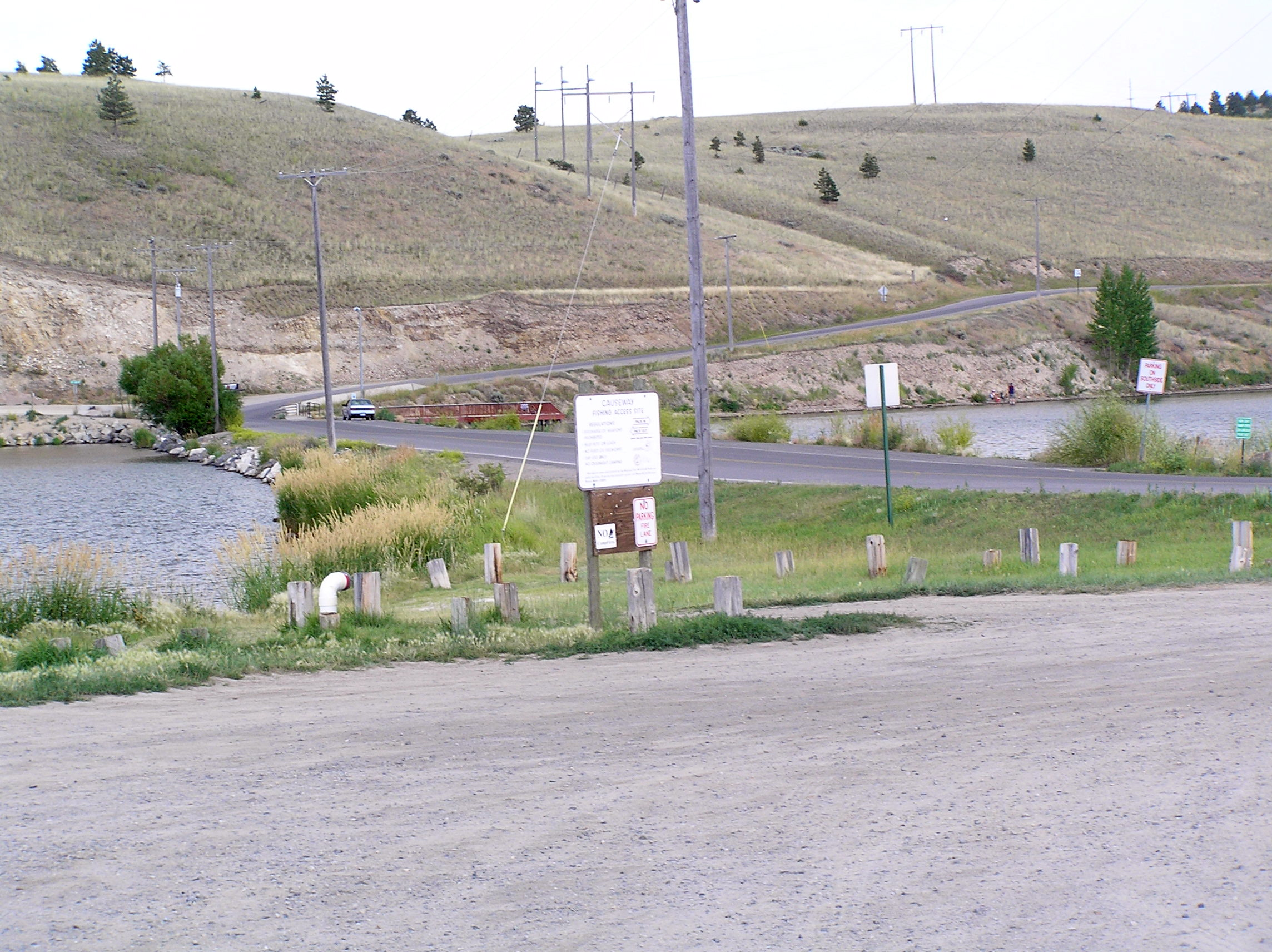
Lake Helena causeway, looking due east. Lake Helena to the right, flooded arm of Prickly Pear Creek to left

In 1945, a causeway was built to separate the lake from the flooded canyon portion of the old Prickly Pear Creek. The causeway replaced a 1904 combination steel and wood bridge. The steel span was 120' long, and the overall length of the bridge was 520'. The concrete piers of the steel bridge, which was sold for scrap and dismantled in 1952, can still be seen just north of the causeway.

Water from Tenmile Creek, Prickly Pear Creek, Silver Creek, and the Helena Valley Irrigation Project flows into the west end of the lake. Lake Helena supported a commercial carp fishery for decades. The marshy west end of the lake is now a popular birding location.
