= Helena Valley Reservoir =

Reservoir in Lewis and Clark County, Montana

- Helena Valley Regulating Reservoir, Helena Regulating Reservoir
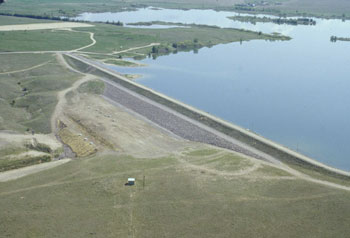
- Aerial view of the Helena Valley Reservoir dam and reservoir
- Interactive map of Helena Valley Reservoir
- Location: Helena, Montana
- Coordinates: 46.64097°N 111.87173°W
- Type: Reservoir
- Etymology: The geographical area named the Helena Valley
- Primary inflows: Canals
- Primary outflows: Canals
- Managing agency: Helena Valley Irrigation District
- Surface area: 553 acres (224 ha)
- Water volume: 10,000 acre⋅ft (12,000,000 m^{3})
- Shore length^{1}: 6 miles (9.7 km)
- Surface elevation: 3,825.6 ft (1,166.0 m)
- Settlements: Helena, Montana
- ^{1} Shore length is not a well-defined measure.

Helena Valley Reservoir, also known as the Helena Regulating Reservoir and Helena Valley Regulating Reservoir, is a reservoir located in Lewis and Clark County in the U.S. state of Montana. The reservoir offers recreational opportunities and irrigation water.

== History ==
To serve the Helena Valley after the backing up of the Canyon Ferry Dam, the Helena Valley Irrigation District and other similar companies and districts were formed in 1956 for the same purpose. From 1956 to 1958, the group reclaimed land that was destroyed or inundated from the backup. The Helena Valley Dam and Reservoir were built in 1957-1958. Additionally, the district created an enclosed pumping plant (the Missouri River Water Treatment Plant) near the Canyon Ferry Dam, as well as several canals, ditches, and underground water supply pipes. Currently, the company provides 18,000 acres of water to the City of Helena in addition to other residents out of the city. Recently, the irrigation district made improvements to the treatment plant.

== Structure ==
The Helena Valley Dam contains of a tunnel dam in addition to two gates to divert water.

The reservoir is located on the eastern edge of the Helena Valley just off York Road.The Helena Valley Reservoir contains 518 surface acres with 6 miles (5 able to be used for recreation) of shoreline, picnic areas with shelter, tables and toilets.

== Species ==
The Montana Department of Fish, Wildlife and Parks have identified six species of fish in the reservoir, with 3 of them being native to the state. They include burbot, common carp, kokanee salmon, longnose sucker, white sucker and yellow perch. The reservoir is a fishery for Kokanee.
