= List of bridges documented by the Historic American Engineering Record in Montana =

This is a list of bridges documented by the Historic American Engineering Record in the US state of Montana.

== Bridges ==
| Survey No. | Name (as assigned by HAER) | Status | Type | Built | Documented | Carries | Crosses | Location | County | Coordinates |
|---|---|---|---|---|---|---|---|---|---|---|
| MT-1 | Victor Bridge | Replaced | Pratt truss | 1907 | 1981 | S-370 | Bitterroot River | Victor | Ravalli | 46°24′52″N 114°07′37″W |
| MT-2 | York Bridge | Replaced | Pennsylvania truss | 1906 | 1981 | S-280 | Trout Creek | Helena | Lewis and Clark | 46°42′39″N 111°46′48″W |
| MT-4 | Milk River Bridge at Coburg | Extant | Parker truss | 1916 | 1980 | Local Road 194 | Milk River | Coburg | Blaine | 48°26′37″N 108°25′30″W |
| MT-7 | Fromberg Bridge | Extant | Reinforced concrete closed-spandrel arch | 1914 | 1980 | East River Street | Clarks Fork Yellowstone River | Fromberg | Carbon | 45°23′30″N 108°53′42″W |
| MT-8 | Tenth Street Bridge | Bypassed | Reinforced concrete open-spandrel arch | 1920 | 1980 | 10th Street North | Missouri River | Great Falls | Cascade | 47°31′14″N 111°17′25″W |
| MT-9 | Fort Benton Bridge | Bypassed | Swing span | 1888 | 1980 | 15th Street | Missouri River | Fort Benton | Chouteau | 47°49′01″N 110°39′58″W |
| MT-10 | Springdale Bridge | Replaced | Pennsylvania truss | 1908 | 1981 | S-563 | Yellowstone River | Springdale | Park | 45°44′38″N 110°13′58″W |
| MT-12 | Barber Bridge | Replaced | Pratt truss | 1911 | 1982 | South Barber Road | Musselshell River | Barber | Golden Valley | 46°18′30″N 109°23′07″W |
| MT-13 | Fort Keogh Bridge | Demolished | Pennsylvania truss | 1902 | 1980 | Local Road 056 | Yellowstone River | Miles City | Custer | 46°23′54″N 105°53′45″W |
| MT-14 | Kinsey Bridge | Extant | Parker truss | 1907 | 1980 | Milwaukee Road | Yellowstone River | Miles City | Custer | 46°31′54″N 105°42′51″W |
| MT-15 | Paragon Bridge | Extant | Parker truss | 1907 | 1980 | Milwaukee Road | Yellowstone River | Miles City | Custer | 46°22′14″N 105°56′13″W |
| MT-16 | Tongue River Bridge | Replaced | Pennsylvania truss | 1879 | 1980 | Local Road 054 (Pacific Avenue) | Tongue River | Miles City | Custer | 46°23′56″N 105°51′18″W |
| MT-17 | Deerfield Bridge | Demolished | Pratt truss | 1913 | 1980 | Cristy Bottom Road | Judith River | Danvers | Fergus | 47°14′27″N 109°40′52″W |
| MT-18 | Judith River Bridge | Replaced | Warren truss | 1912 | 1980 | Tognetti Road | Judith River | Moore | Fergus | 47°03′48″N 109°44′05″W |
| MT-19 | Sample's Crossing Bridge | Replaced | Parker truss | 1899 | 1980 | MT 81 | Judith River | Danvers | Fergus | 47°16′25″N 109°43′12″W |
| MT-20 | Coram Bridge | Extant | Baltimore truss | 1900 | 1980 | Great Northern Railway | Flathead River | Coram | Flathead | 48°24′34″N 114°03′12″W |
| MT-21 | Old Steel Bridge | Replaced | Pratt truss | 1894 | 1980 | Steel Bridge Road | Flathead River | Kalispell | Flathead | 48°12′37″N 114°15′27″W |
| MT-22 | St. Mary River Bridge and Siphon | Extant | Pratt truss | 1915 | 1980 | Camp Nine Road | St. Mary River | Babb | Glacier | 48°56′37″N 113°22′14″W |
| MT-23 | Dearborn River High Bridge | Extant | Pratt truss | 1897 | 1980 | S-434 | Dearborn River | Augusta | Lewis and Clark | 47°16′52″N 112°23′25″W |
| MT-24 | Wolf Creek Bridge | Extant | Warren truss | 1933 | 1980 | Recreation Road | Missouri River | Craig | Lewis and Clark | 47°01′08″N 112°00′44″W |
| MT-25 | Roundup Bridge | Extant | Parker truss | 1894 | 1980 | Goffena Road | Musselshell River | Roundup | Musselshell | 46°29′29″N 108°17′15″W |
| MT-26 | Calipso Bridge | Extant | Parker truss | 1907 | 1980 | Milwaukee Road | Yellowstone River | Terry | Prairie | 46°46′47″N 105°24′41″W |
| MT-27 | Snowden Bridge | Extant | Vertical-lift bridge | 1913 | 1980 | Great Northern Railway | Missouri River | Nohly and Bainville | Richland and Roosevelt | 48°00′00″N 104°05′44″W |
| MT-28 | Main Channel Bridge | Extant | Pratt truss | 1911 | 1980 | South Gallatin Street | Clark Fork River | Thompson Falls | Sanders | 47°35′25″N 115°21′20″W |
| MT-29 | Dry Channel Bridge | Extant | Pratt truss | 1911 | 1980 | South Gallatin Street | Clark Fork River | Thompson Falls | Sanders | 47°35′37″N 115°21′14″W |
| MT-49 | Fish Creek Bridge | Replaced | Warren truss | 1934 | 1987 | Cyr–Iron Mountain Road | Fish Creek | Alberton | Mineral | 47°00′23″N 114°41′39″W |
| MT-56 | Joliet Bridge | Replaced | Pratt truss | 1901 | 1988 | Main Street | Rock Creek | Joliet | Carbon | 45°28′52″N 108°58′04″W |
| MT-59 | Vandalia Bridge | Replaced | Pennsylvania truss | 1910 | 1988 | Vandalia Road | Milk River | Glasgow | Valley | 48°21′30″N 106°54′17″W |
| MT-60 | Duck Creek Bridge | Replaced | Warren truss | 1915 | 1988 | S-329 (Duck Creek Road) | Yellowstone River | Billings | Yellowstone | 45°41′37″N 108°38′27″W |
| MT-61 | Pine Creek Bridge | Replaced | Parker truss | 1910 | 1988 | Pine Creek Road | Yellowstone River | Livingston | Park | 45°30′40″N 110°34′54″W |
| MT-62 | Greycliff Bridge | Replaced | Parker truss | 1911 | 1988 | Lower Sweet Grass Road | Yellowstone River | Greycliff | Sweet Grass | 45°45′36″N 109°46′19″W |
| MT-63 | Blaine Spring Creek Bridge | Extant | Pratt truss | 1892 | 1989 | S-249 | Blaine Spring Creek | Ennis | Madison | 45°13′57″N 111°45′23″W |
| MT-64 | Upper Madison Bridge | Extant | Pratt truss | 1897 | 2013 | S-249 | Madison River | Ennis | Madison | 45°13′58″N 111°45′06″W |
| MT-67-A; MT-73 | Avalanche Creek Bridge | Extant | Reinforced concrete cast-in-place slab | 1935 | 1991 | Going-to-the-Sun Road | Avalanche Creek | West Glacier | Flathead | 48°40′49″N 113°49′09″W |
| MT-67-A; MT-75 | Logan Creek Bridge | Extant | Reinforced concrete cast-in-place slab | 1926 | 1991 | Going-to-the-Sun Road | Logan Creek | West Glacier | Flathead | 48°43′29″N 113°45′54″W |
| MT-67-A; MT-82 | Baring Creek Bridge | Extant | Reinforced concrete closed-spandrel arch | 1931 | 1991 | Going-to-the-Sun Road | Baring Creek | West Glacier | Flathead | 48°40′42″N 113°35′45″W |
| MT-67-A; MT-84 | St. Mary River Bridge | Extant | Reinforced concrete closed-spandrel arch | 1933 | 1991 | Going-to-the-Sun Road | St. Mary River | West Glacier | Flathead | 48°44′58″N 113°26′38″W |
| MT-67-B; MT-69 | Common Drainage Culvert | Extant | Culvert | 1937 | 1991 | Going-to-the-Sun Road | Unnamed stream | West Glacier | Flathead | 48°32′14″N 113°57′51″W |
| MT-67-B; MT-70 | Sprague Creek Culvert | Extant | Reinforced concrete cast-in-place slab | 1931 | 1991 | Going-to-the-Sun Road | Sprague Creek | West Glacier | Flathead | 48°36′16″N 113°53′01″W |
| MT-67-B; MT-71 | Snyder Creek Culvert | Extant | Reinforced concrete cast-in-place slab | 1936 | 1991 | Going-to-the-Sun Road | Snyder Creek | West Glacier | Flathead | 48°36′59″N 113°52′34″W |
| MT-67-B; MT-72 | Horse Trail Underpass | Extant | Reinforced concrete cast-in-place slab | 1936 | 1991 | Going-to-the-Sun Road | Glacier National Park trail | West Glacier | Flathead | 48°38′19″N 113°51′35″W |
| MT-67-B; MT-74 | Creek Culvert | Extant | Reinforced concrete cast-in-place slab | 1926 | 1991 | Going-to-the-Sun Road | Unnamed stream | West Glacier | Flathead | 48°40′46″N 113°45′55″W |
| MT-67-B; MT-78 | Haystack Creek Culvert | Extant | Reinforced concrete cast-in-place slab | 1926 | 1991 | Going-to-the-Sun Road | Haystack Creek | West Glacier | Flathead | 48°44′19″N 113°44′43″W |
| MT-67-B; MT-81 | Siyeh Creek Culvert | Extant | Reinforced concrete cast-in-place slab | 1931 | 1991 | Going-to-the-Sun Road | Siyeh Creek | West Glacier | Flathead | 48°42′06″N 113°40′04″W |
| MT-68 | Belton Bridge | Extant | Reinforced concrete open-spandrel arch | 1920 | 1992 | Going-to-the-Sun Road | Flathead River middle fork | West Glacier | Flathead | 48°29′59″N 113°58′11″W |
| MT-77 | Granite Creek Culvert | Extant | Reinforced concrete closed-spandrel arch | 1926 | 1992 | Going-to-the-Sun Road | Granite Creek | West Glacier | Flathead | 48°44′33″N 113°46′16″W |
| MT-79 | Triple Arches | Extant | Stone arch | 1928 | 1992 | Going-to-the-Sun Road | Pollock Mountain rift | West Glacier | Flathead | 48°43′00″N 113°43′06″W |
| MT-85 | Divide Creek Bridge | Extant | Reinforced concrete cast-in-place slab | 1935 | 1992 | Going-to-the-Sun Road | Divide Creek | West Glacier | Flathead | 48°44′39″N 113°25′53″W |
| MT-95-L | Rainbow Hydroelectric Facility, Stone Culvert | Demolished | Stone arch | 1925 | 2009 | Swimming Pool Road | Unnamed stream | Great Falls | Cascade | 47°32′16″N 111°11′52″W |
| MT-95-M | Rainbow Hydroelectric Facility, Plank Bridge | Demolished | Timber stringer | 1925 | 2009 | Swimming Pool Road | Unnamed stream | Great Falls | Cascade | 47°32′17″N 111°11′52″W |
| MT-96 | Wolf Point Bridge | Replaced | Pennsylvania truss | 1930 | 1997 | MT 13 | Missouri River | Wolf Point and Vida | Roosevelt and McCone | 48°04′02″N 105°32′06″W |
| MT-99 | Orange Street Bridge | Replaced | Warren truss | 1937 | 1999 | Orange Street | Clark Fork River | Missoula | Missoula | 46°52′18″N 114°00′03″W |
| MT-100 | Milwaukee Road Railroad Overpass | Replaced | Reinforced concrete T-beam | 1936 | 1999 | Orange Street | Milwaukee Road | Missoula | Missoula | 46°52′13″N 114°00′10″W |
| MT-102 | Bundy Bridge | Bypassed | Warren truss | 1915 | 1998 | Bundy Road | Yellowstone River | Pompey's Pillar | Yellowstone | 45°59′51″N 108°00′32″W |
| MT-103 | Voges Bridge | Replaced | Pratt truss | 1914 | 1998 | Grey Bear Road | Yellowstone River | Big Timber | Sweet Grass | 45°47′24″N 110°03′59″W |
| MT-106 | Milk River Bridge | Replaced | Parker truss | 1911 | 1999 | Tampico North Road | Milk River | Tampico | Valley | 48°18′30″N 106°49′21″W |
| MT-107 | Buckingham Coulee Bridge | Replaced | Timber stringer | 1936 | 1999 | S-311 | Buckingham Coulee | Hysham | Treasure | 46°15′16″N 107°17′01″W |
| MT-112 | Missouri River Bridge | Replaced | Pratt truss | 1904 | 2002 | Bridge Street | Missouri River | Craig | Lewis and Clark | 47°04′28″N 111°57′41″W |
| MT-114 | Logan Overpass | Replaced | Reinforced concrete T-beam | 1934 | 2003 | S-205 | Montana Rail Link | Logan | Gallatin | 45°53′05″N 111°26′13″W |
| MT-115 | Logan Viaduct | Demolished | Reinforced concrete T-beam | 1934 | 2004 | S-205 | Trident Road | Logan | Gallatin | 45°53′06″N 111°26′18″W |
| MT-116 | Garrison Bridge | Replaced | Pratt truss | 1912 | 2004 | Sawmill Road | Clark Fork River | Garrison | Powell | 46°31′11″N 112°48′29″W |
| MT-117 | Toluca Overpass | Replaced | Reinforced concrete T-beam | 1936 | 2004 | US 87 / US 212 (former) | Burlington Northern Railroad | Hardin | Big Horn | 45°44′44″N 107°51′30″W |
| MT-118 | Rosebud Creek Bridge | Replaced | Warren truss | 1929 | 2004 | S-446 | Rosebud Creek | Rosebud | Rosebud | 46°16′08″N 106°28′39″W |
| MT-119 | Tongue River Bridge | Replaced | Steel built-up girder | 1934 | 2004 | I-94 BL (Main Street) | Tongue River | Miles City | Custer | 46°24′13″N 105°51′31″W |
| MT-122 | Scenic Bridge | Extant | Pratt truss | 1928 | 2004 | US 10 (former) | Clark Fork River | Tarkio | Mineral | 47°01′12″N 114°39′25″W |
| MT-123 | Merrill Bridge | Replaced | Parker truss | 1913 | 2005 | Snake Creek–Merrill Road | Milk River | Harlem | Blaine | 48°31′28″N 108°51′19″W |
| MT-124 | Belt Creek Bridge | Replaced | Warren truss | 1923 | 2005 | Belt Street | Belt Creek | Belt | Cascade | 47°23′13″N 110°55′37″W |
| MT-125 | Belt Creek Bridge | Demolished | Steel rolled stringer | 1936 | 2005 | S-288 | Belt Creek | Waltham | Chouteau | 47°32′41″N 110°53′59″W |
| MT-127 | Ten Mile Creek Bridge | Replaced | Pratt truss | 1895 | 2004 | Williams Street | Ten Mile Creek | Helena | Lewis and Clark | 46°36′19″N 112°05′18″W |
| MT-129 | Silver Bridge | Replaced | Warren truss | 1940 | 2004 | US 93 | Bitterroot River | Hamilton | Ravalli | 46°16′42″N 114°09′43″W |
| MT-131 | Rock Creek Bridge | Replaced | Pratt truss | 1991 | 2006 | Fox Road | Rock Creek | Fox | Carbon | 45°16′38″N 109°12′35″W |
| MT-133 | Chicago, Milwaukee, St. Paul & Pacific Railroad Company Bridge No. DD-302 | Demolished | Trestle | 1907 | 2006 | Milwaukee Road | Clark Fork River | Bonner | Missoula | 46°51′51″N 113°52′41″W |
| MT-134 | Milltown Bridge | Extant | Parker truss | 1921 | 2007 | Anaconda Street | Blackfoot River | Milltown | Missoula | 46°52′24″N 113°52′58″W |
| MT-137 | Pearson Bridge | Replaced | Warren truss | 1921 | 2007 | Vaughn–Ulm Road | Sun River | Vaughn | Cascade | 47°32′44″N 111°31′48″W |
| MT-139 | Two Medicine River Bridge | Replaced | Warren truss | 1942 | 2009 | US 2 | Two Medicine River | East Glacier Park Village | Glacier | 48°27′00″N 113°12′23″W |
| MT-142 | Heron Bridge | Extant | Cantilever | 1920 | 2010 | Heron Road | Clark Fork River and Cabinet Gorge | Heron | Sanders | 48°04′07″N 115°58′46″W |
| MT-144 | Big Hole River Bridge | Replaced | Warren truss | 1914 | 2010 | Pumphouse Road | Big Hole River | Divide | Silver Bow | 45°45′35″N 112°48′06″W |
| MT-146 | Main Street Bridge | Replaced | Reinforced concrete cast-in-place slab | 1933 | 2013 | I-90 BL (Main Street) | Cottonwood Creek | Deer Lodge | Powell | 46°24′07″N 112°44′06″W |
| MT-147 | Swan River Bridge | Extant | Prestressed concrete beam | 1963 | 2013 | S-209 | Swan River | Bigfork | Flathead | 48°03′03″N 113°58′58″W |
| MT-149 | Fort Shaw Canal Bridge | Extant | Reinforced concrete T-beam | 1934 | 2013 | MT 21 (Simms–Augusta Road) | Fort Shaw Canal | Simms | Cascade | 47°29′42″N 111°58′54″W |
| MT-150 | Swiftcurrent Bridge | Replaced | Reinforced concrete cast-in-place slab | 1930 | 2014 | Glacier Route 3 (Babb–Many Glacier Road) | Swiftcurrent Creek | Babb | Glacier | 48°47′58″N 113°39′24″W |
| MT-151 | Elk Creek Bridge | Extant | Reinforced concrete T-beam | 1935 | 2014 | MT 21 (Augusta–Sun River Road) | Elk Creek | Augusta | Lewis and Clark | 47°30′09″N 112°22′02″W |
| MT-152 | Musselshell River Bridge | Extant | Pratt truss | 1916 | 2012 | Parrott Creek Road | Musselshell River | Roundup | Musselshell | 46°28′18″N 108°23′29″W |
| MT-153 | Musselshell River Bridge near Absher | Extant | Warren truss | 1916 | 2012 | Queens Point Road | Musselshell River | Melstone | Musselshell | 46°33′32″N 107°58′39″W |
| MT-155 | Brown's Gulch Bridge | Extant | Reinforced concrete cast-in-place slab | 1921 | 2015 | S-276 | Brown's Gulch Creek | Butte | Silver Bow | 46°03′39″N 112°36′51″W |
| MT-156 | Griffith Creek Bridge | Extant | Timber stringer | 1932 | 2015 | Local Road 300 | Griffith Creek | Glendive | Dawson | 47°06′16″N 104°35′50″W |
| MT-157 | Axtell Bridge | Extant | Warren truss | 1919 | 2015 | Axtell–Anceney Road | Gallatin River | Gallatin Gateway | Gallatin | 45°37′23″N 111°12′19″W |
| MT-158 | South Fork of the Flathead River Bridge | Replaced | Steel built-up girder | 1938 | 2015 | US 2 | Flathead River south fork | Hungry Horse | Flathead | 48°23′04″N 114°04′43″W |
| MT-159 | Beaver Creek Bridge | Extant | Steel built-up girder | 1940 | 2015 | MT 7 (Old U.S. 10) | Beaver Creek | Wibaux | Wibaux | 46°59′24″N 104°11′01″W |
| MT-160 | Kern's Crossing Bridge | Extant | Pratt truss | 1907 | 2015 | Bridge Road | Stillwater River | Absarokee | Stillwater | 45°31′43″N 109°28′10″W |
| MT-161 | Conley Street Bridge | Extant | Reinforced concrete T-beam | 1912 | 2016 | Conley Avenue | Clark Fork River | Deer Lodge | Powell | 46°23′26″N 112°44′14″W |
| MT-162 | Old Scobey Road Bridge | Extant | Pratt truss | 1913 | 2016 | Old Scobey Road | Poplar River | Scobey | Daniels | 48°47′11″N 105°27′13″W |
| MT-165 | Beaver Creek Bridge | Extant | Pratt truss | 1911 | 2016 | Larb Creek Road | Beaver Creek | Saco | Phillips | 48°26′58″N 107°20′42″W |
| MT-166 | Armells Creek Bridge | Extant | Timber stringer | 1962 | 2016 | Horse Ranch Road | Armells Creek | Roy | Fergus | 47°23′47″N 109°07′54″W |
| MT-167 | Big Porcupine Creek Bridge | Extant | Warren truss | 1914 | 2016 | Big Porcupine Road | Big Porcupine Creek | Ingomar | Rosebud | 46°35′05″N 107°05′45″W |
| MT-168 | Maclay Bridge | Extant | Parker truss | 1953 | 2016 | North Avenue | Bitterroot River | Missoula | Missoula | 46°51′10″N 114°05′52″W |
| MT-170 | Milk River Bridge | Extant | Pennsylvania truss | 1910 | 2011 | North Fork Road | Milk River | Zurich | Blaine | 48°34′41″N 109°06′37″W |
| MT-171 | South Fork of Milk River Bridge | Extant | Reinforced concrete closed-spandrel arch | 1928 | 2017 | US 89 | Milk River south fork | Kiowa | Glacier | 48°39′05″N 113°19′13″W |
| MT-173 | Yellowstone River Bridge | Extant | Pratt truss | 1930 | 2017 | Twin Bridges Road | Yellowstone River | Reed Point | Stillwater | 45°41′12″N 109°26′18″W |
| MT-174 | Musselshell River Bridge | Extant | Steel rolled stringer | 1943 | 2017 | US 12 | Musselshell River | Melstone | Musselshell | 46°37′14″N 107°49′17″W |
