= Scapegoat (disambiguation) =

A scapegoat is a goat used in a religious ritual or the victim of scapegoating, the singling out of a party for unmerited blame.

Scapegoat or The Scapegoat may also refer to:

== Places ==
- Scapegoat Wilderness, a Wilderness Area in Montana
  - Scapegoat Mountain, a mountain in the Scapegoat Wilderness
- Scapegoat Hill, a village in West Yorkshire

== Literature ==
- The Scapegoat, translated work by Arvid Paulson from August Strindberg's Syndabocken
- "The Scapegoat", a study of collective violence by René Girard
- The Scapegoat (Du Maurier novel), a 1957 novel by Daphne du Maurier
- Scapegoat, an investigation into the trial of Richard Hauptmann
- Scapegoat: The Jews, Israel, and Women's Liberation, a 2000 book by Andrea Dworkin
- "The Scapegoat" (Cherryh novel), a 1985 novella by science fiction writer C. J. Cherryh
- The Scapegoat, a novel by Hall Caine

== Film, television and radio ==
- The Scapegoat (1912 film), an American short film starring Tom Mix, directed by Otis B. Thayer
- The Scapegoat (1914 film), an American short film starring Tom Mix, directed by Tom Mix
- The Scapegoat (1917 film), a Frederick Douglass Film Company production based on a story by Paul Laurence Dunbar
- The Scapegoat (1959 film), an adaptation of the du Maurier novel, starring Alec Guinness and Bette Davis
- The Scapegoat (2009), a film by BBC Northern Ireland about the murder of Patricia Curran, daughter of Lancelot Curran, in 1952
- Scapegoat (2011 film), a Turkish film
- The Scapegoat (2012 film), a British remake of the du Maurier novel
- The Scapegoat (2013 film), a French film
- The Scapegoat (audio drama), a Doctor Who audio drama

== Music ==
=== Albums ===
- Scapegoat (album), by Takuto, 2017
- Scapegoat, by Josh Abbott Band, 2008
- Scapegoats (album), a 1991 album by Green on Red

=== Songs ===
- "Scapegoat" (song), by D'banj, 2010
- "Scapegoat", by Atmosphere from Overcast!, 1997
- "Scapegoat", by Chimaira from The Age of Hell, 2011
- "Scapegoat", by Chumbawamba from Tubthumper, 1997
- "Scapegoat", by Downthesun from Downthesun, 2002
- "Scapegoat", by Fad Gadget from Under the Flag, 1982
- "Scapegoat", by Fear Factory from Soul of a New Machine, 1992
- "Scapegoat", by Godflesh from Messiah, 2000/2003
- "Scapegoat", by Guano Apes from Proud Like a God, 1997
- "Scapegoat", by Sevendust from Chapter VII: Hope & Sorrow
- "Scapegoats", by Christy Moore from Smoke & Strong Whiskey, 1991
- "Scapegoats", by Baby Keem from The Melodic Blue, 2021

== Other uses ==
- The Scapegoat (painting), by William Holman Hunt
- SS-14 Scapegoat, a Soviet ballistic missile
- Scapegoat tree, a binary search tree used in computer science
- "The Scapegoat", a moniker used by American professional wrestler Jack Perry
