= Ingomar Public School =

- U.S. National Register of Historic Places
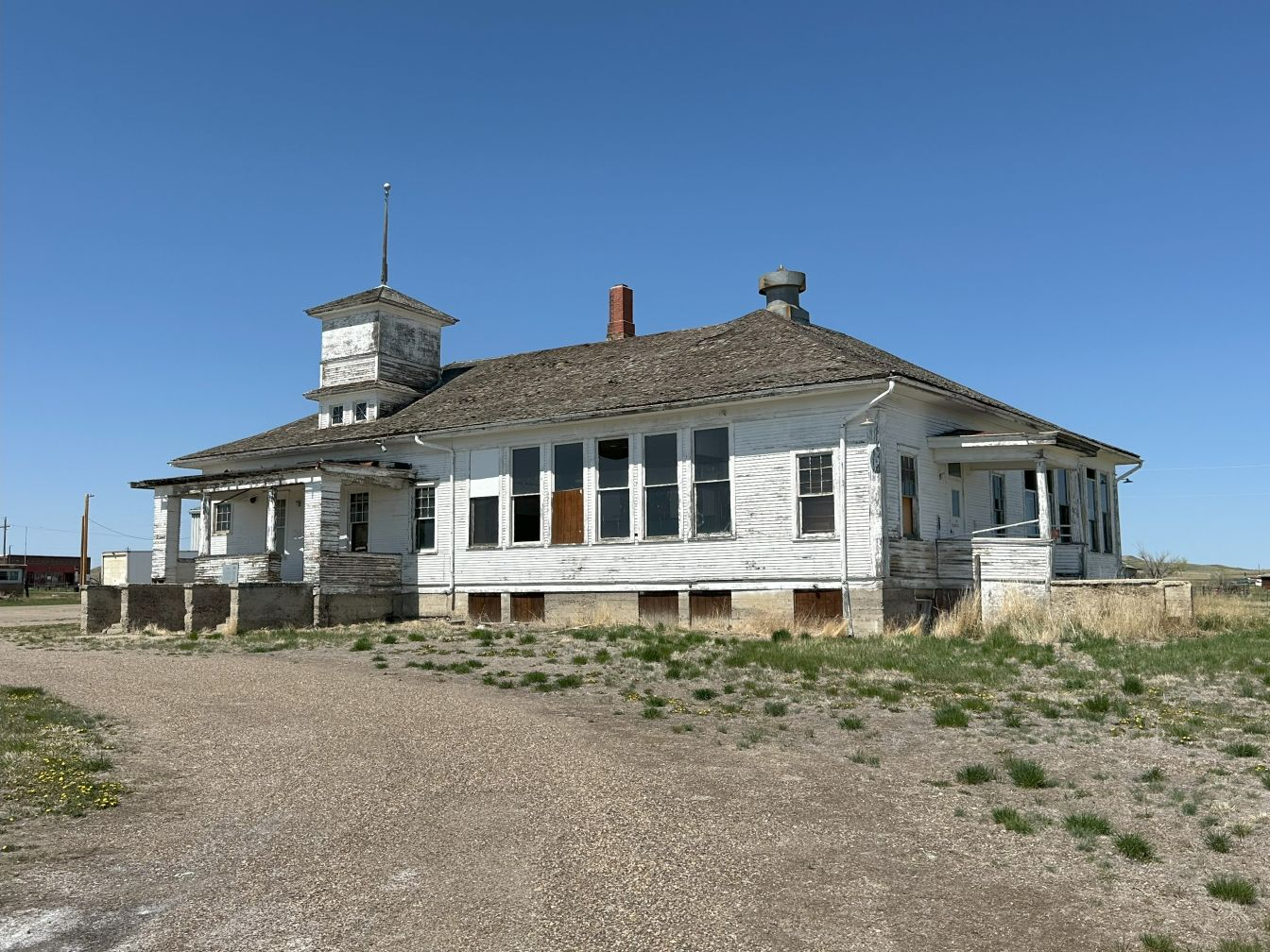
- The building 2025

- Location within Montana
- Location: Second Ave. Ingomar, Montana
- Coordinates: 46°34′38″N 107°22′17″W
- Area: less than one acre
- Built: 1913
- Built by: Neils Hanson and others
- Architectural style: Hip-Roofed Schoolhouse
- NRHP reference No.: 94001068
- Added to NRHP: September 2, 1994

The Ingomar Public School, also known as Ingomar High School, on Second Avenue in Ingomar, Montana, was built in 1913. It was listed on the National Register of Historic Places in 1994.

It is an L-shaped hipped roof building. It was built in 1913, with a square, symmetrical plan, and was expanded in 1915.

It was deemed

significant as a well-preserved, representative example of the dozens of pioneer schoolhouses constructed in eastern Montana during the first three decades of the twentieth century. School facilities, such as those erected at Ingomar, typically were among the first vestiges of "community" culture to be established in a newly-settled region. This reflected the relative importance placed on education by the region's pioneer inhabitants; simultaneously, the early presence of a school building commonly made the facility a focal point for other civic and community activities. The Ingomar school building and its contemporaries thus functioned as centers for a wide variety of public activities. More than any other building in the historic Ingomar townsite, the town's school facilities represented the social, civic, and educational activities and goals of the Ingomar community.
