= Fairview Lift Bridge =

- U.S. National Register of Historic Places
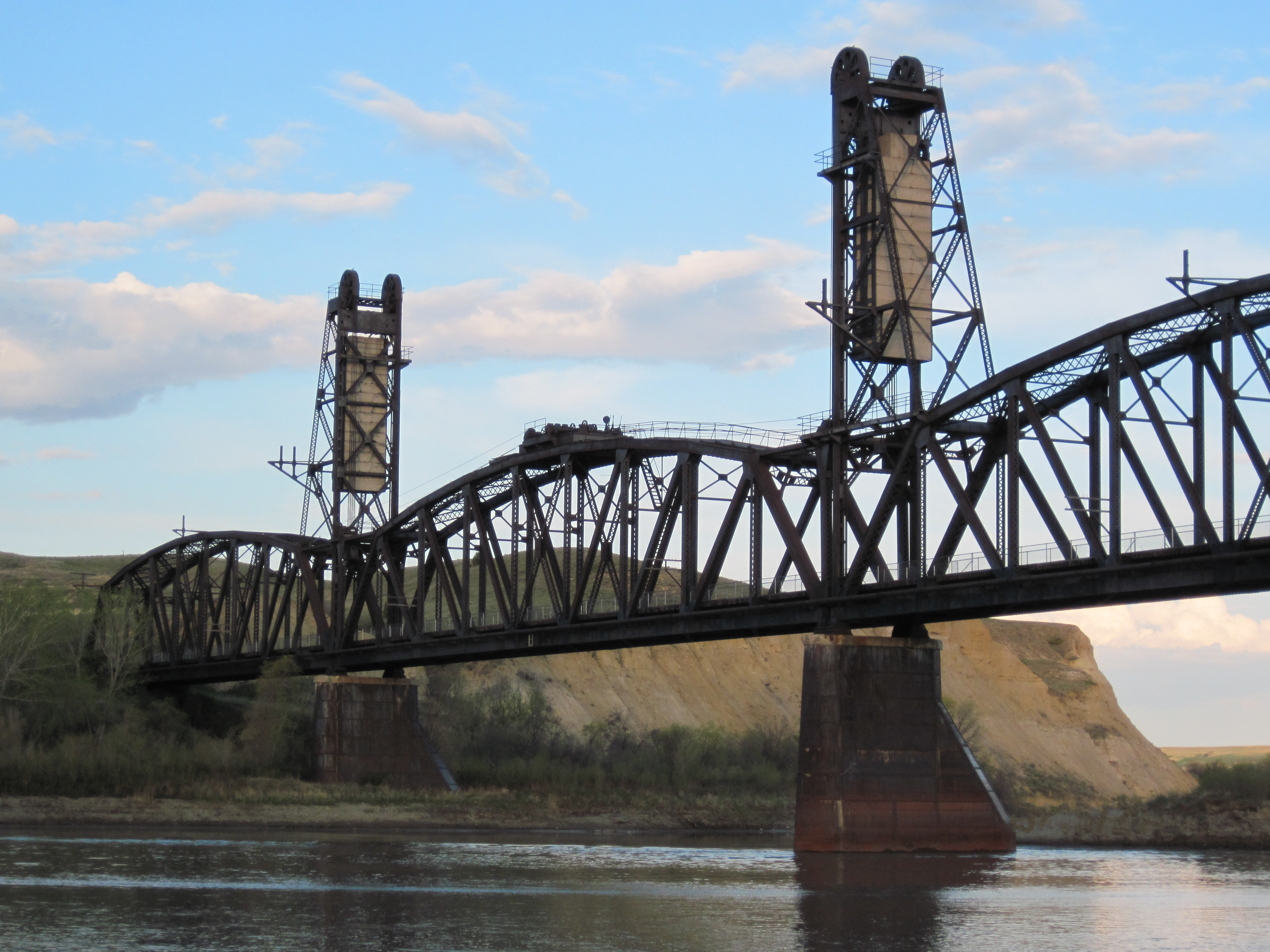
- Bridge in 2010

- Location within North Dakota Location within the United States
- Nearest city: Cartwright, North Dakota
- Coordinates: 47°51′31.4″N 103°57′59″W
- Area: 6 acres (2.4 ha)
- Built: 1913
- Built by: Gerrick & Gerrick
- Architectural style: Railroad lift bridge
- MPS: Historic Roadway Bridges of North Dakota MPS
- NRHP reference No.: 97000239
- Added to NRHP: March 14, 1997

The Fairview Lift Bridge, also known as Great Northern Railway Bridge 3.2, was built in 1913. It was listed on the National Register of Historic Places in 1997. It was built by Gerrick & Gerrick of Steele, North Dakota to cross the Yellowstone River. It is one of two almost identical bridges the Montana Eastern Railway built within ten miles of each other which cross different rivers in different states. Its near twin is the Snowden Bridge which crosses the Missouri River in Montana. It is rumored that the body of a lynched railworker and criminal, J.C. Collins, is inside one of the concrete abutments of the bridge.

The railway has not been used since the mid-1980s. In 1996 the bridge was owned by Burlington Northern Santa Fe Railway Company.

It is located in McKenzie County, North Dakota, and is a few hundred feet south of a 1955-built truss bridge of North Dakota State Highway 200. About 300 feet east of the lift bridge along the rail line is the timber-lined Cartwright tunnel, which is "the only completed railroad tunnel" in the state.
