= Lewis and Clark Range =

Mountain range in Montana

- Location within Montana

Highest point
- Elevation: 7,109 ft (2,167 m)
- Coordinates: 47°30′01″N 113°08′03″W

Geography
- Country: United States
- State: Montana

The Lewis and Clark Range, el. 7,109 feet (2,167 m), is a long mountain range stretching across Powell County, Montana, Lewis and Clark County, Montana, Flathead County, Montana, and Pondera County, Montana. It extends Southeast from Marias Pass along the Continental Divide to Little Prickly Pear Creek, some 32 km (20 mi) NW of Helena, and is bounded on the West by the Flathead and Swan Ranges and on the East by the Sawtooth Range."

The range forms much of the Continental Divide in the Bob Marshall Wilderness and Scapegoat Wilderness with highlights such as the Chinese Wall, a 1,000 ft (300 m) high cliffband that runs for 40 miles (64 km) and Scapegoat Mountain.

== See also ==
- List of mountain ranges in Montana
