= Chinese Wall (Montana) =

Large escarpment in Montana, US

Coordinates: 47.656°N 113.128°W

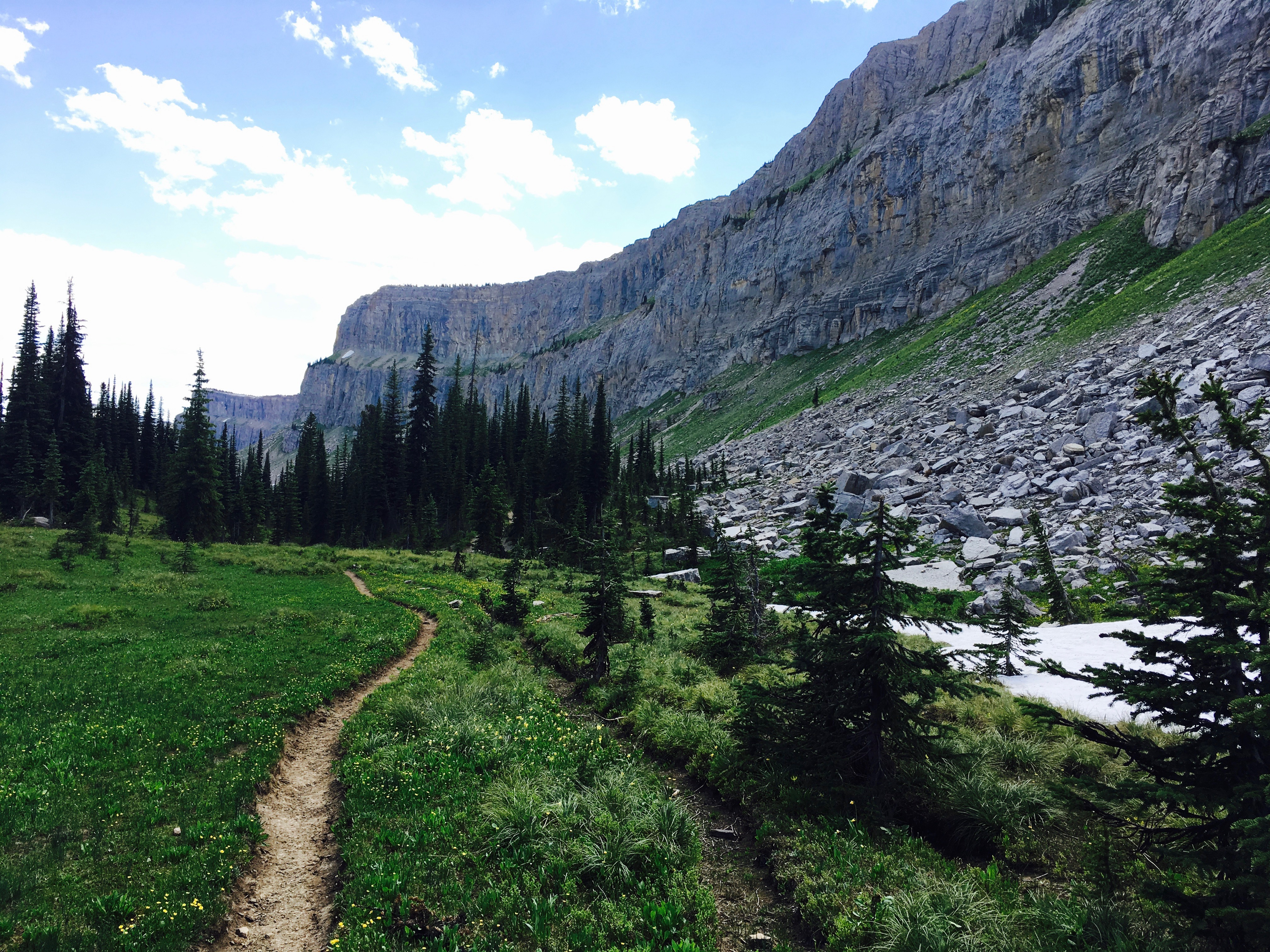
View from below the Chinese Wall looking south

The Chinese Wall is a large cuesta that lies along the crest of the Lewis and Clark Range in Bob Marshall Wilderness Area in northwestern Montana, USA. It stretches from Junction Mountain northward for 15 miles (24 km). It has an eastward-facing escarpment, 700 to 1,300 ft (210 to 400 m) high, carved by Pleistocene glaciers from westward-tilted, sparsely fossiliferous, Middle Cambrian limestones. At the base of this sheer wall, the limestones overlie Middle Cambrian shales and sandstones resting unconformably on late Precambrian sedimentary strata of the Belt Supergroup. The highest points on the wall are named separately as mountain peaks, including Junction, Haystack, Cliff, and Salt mountains. The Chinese Wall makes up part of the Continental Divide: water on the different sides of the wall flow into either the Atlantic Ocean (through the Gulf of Mexico) or the Pacific Ocean.

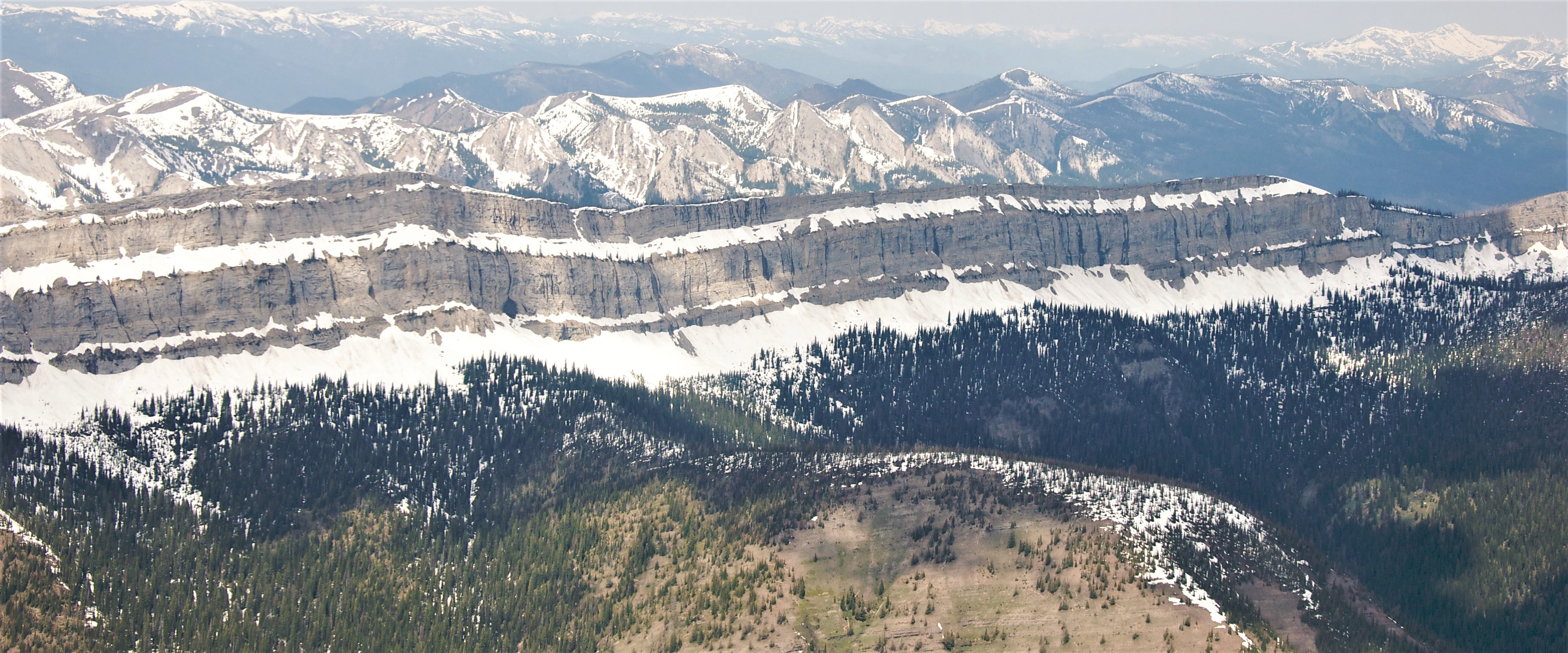
Chinese Wall, Montana

== Access ==
The wall is most commonly accessed through Benchmark Trailhead. It normally takes hikers multiple days to reach the wall, which is located about 18 miles (29 km) from the earlier trailhead. The Continental Divide Trail passes directly below the wall.

There is a camping ban in place directly along the wall to maintain the relatively fragile ecosystem from overuse.

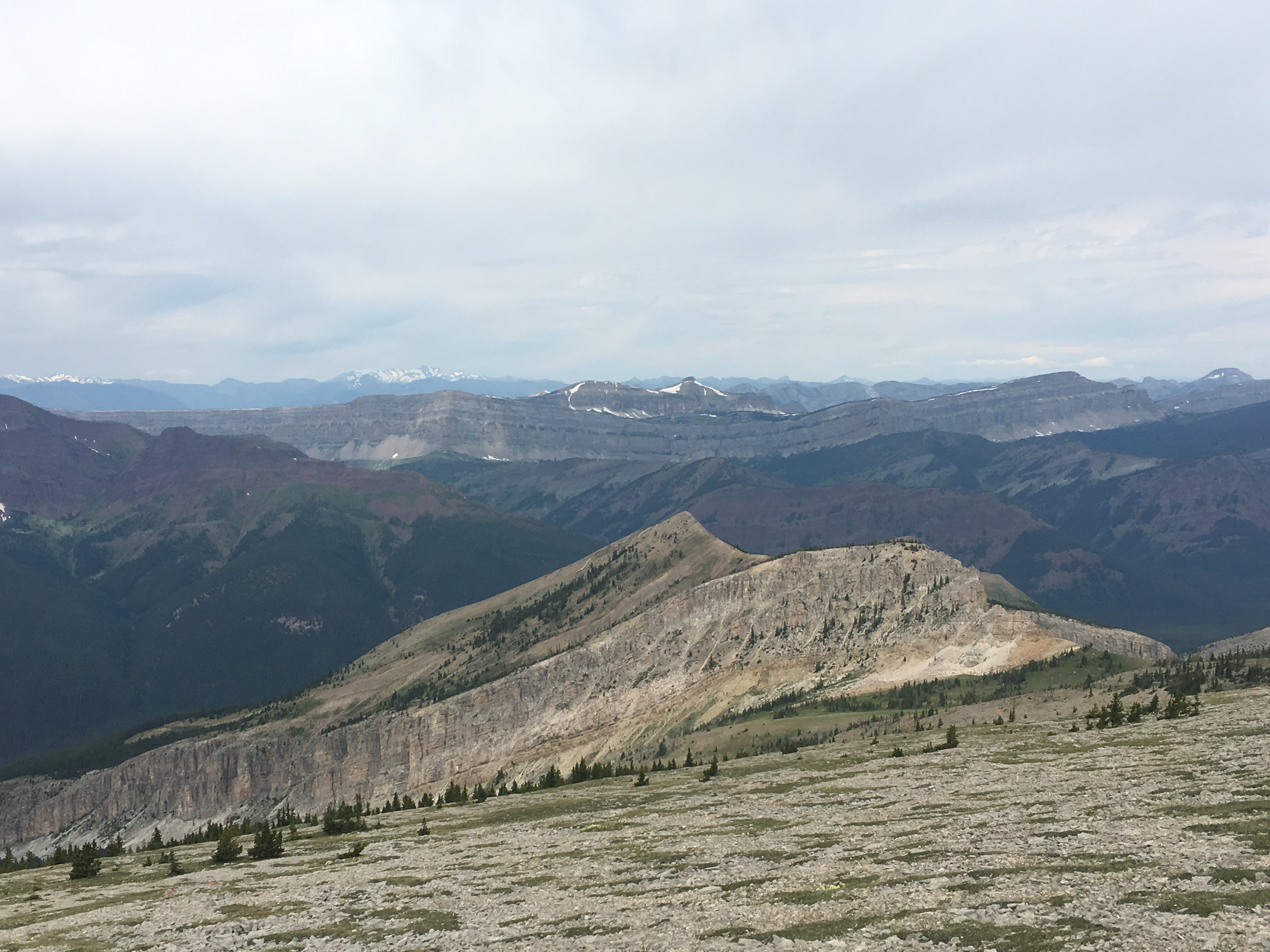
View of the Wall from Prairie Reef Lookout. Wall can be seen going across the photo from center left to center right (below the horizon)

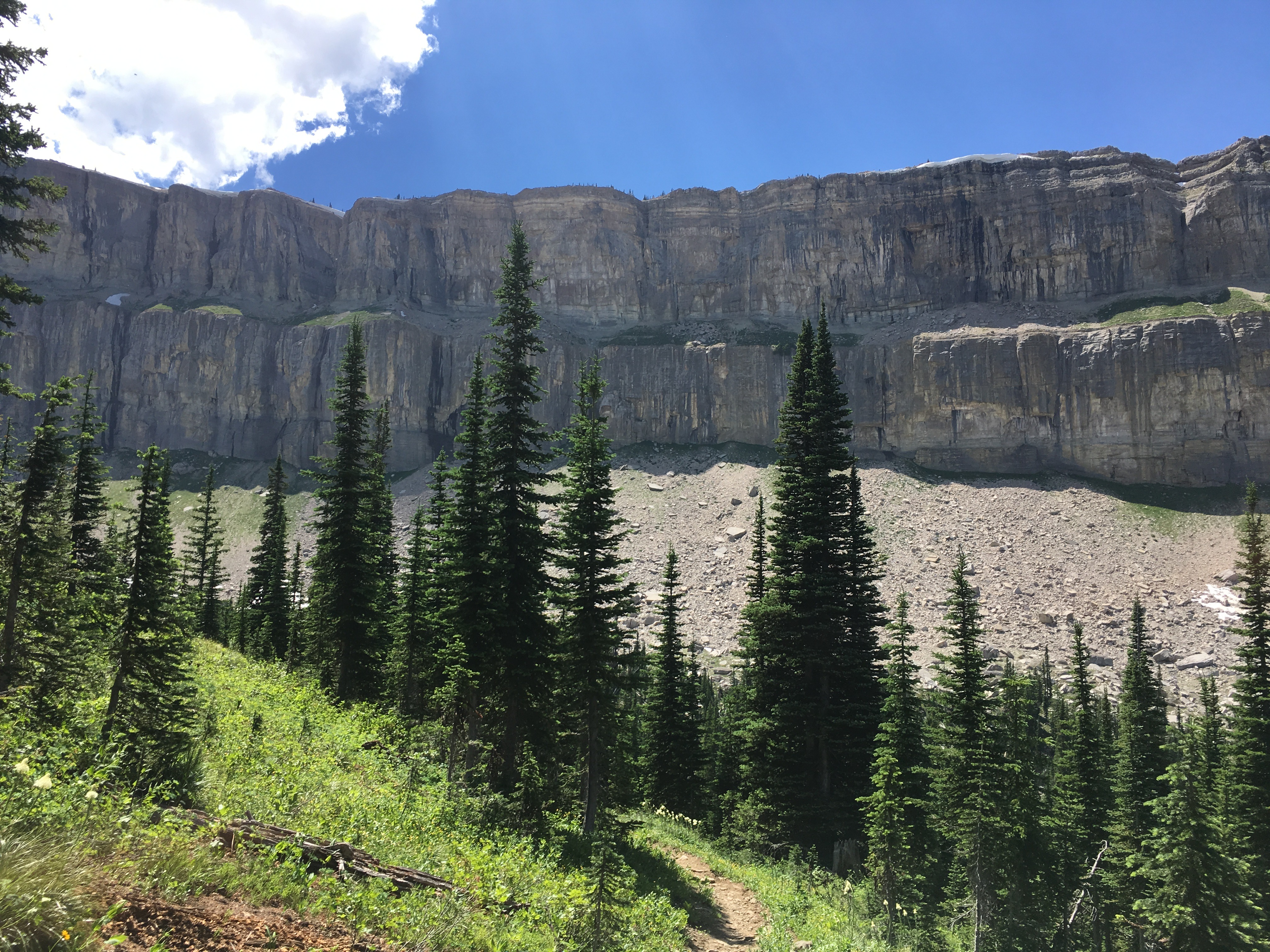
A view of the wall directly facing west.

== See also ==
- List of escarpments
