= Dearborn River High Bridge =

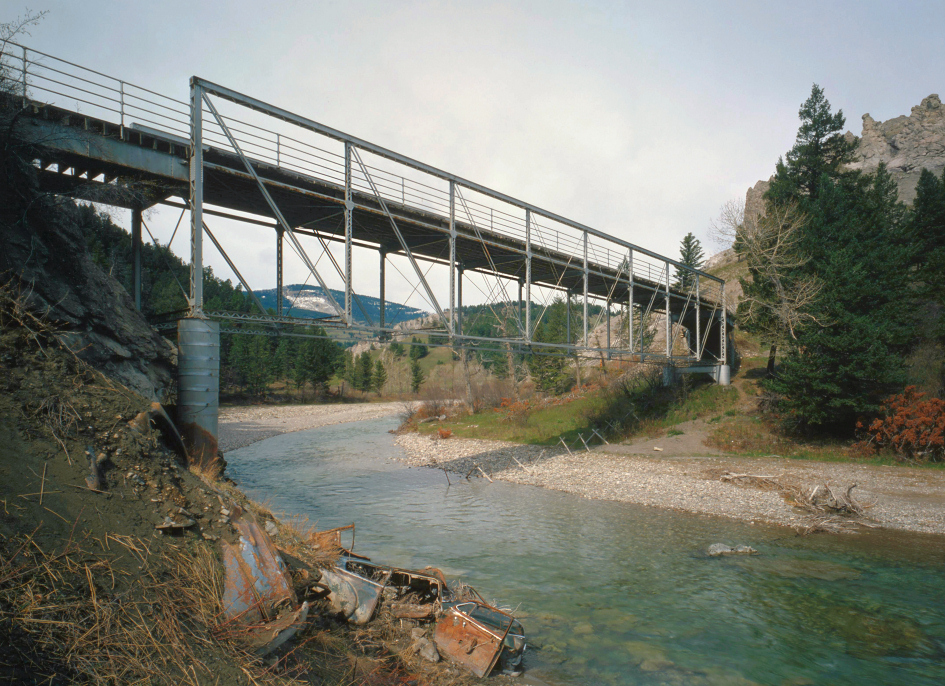
- Dearborn River High Bridge in May 1980
- Coordinates: 47°16′52″N 112°23′24″W
- Crosses: Dearborn River
- Locale: Lewis and Clark County, Montana
- Maintained by: County Highway Agency
- ID number: L25300009+00001

Characteristics
- Design: Pratt half-deck truss
- Material: Steel, concrete, stone
- Total length: 251 feet (77 m)
- Width: 16.1 feet (4.9 m)
- Height: 100 feet (30 m)
- Longest span: 160.1 feet (48.8 m)

History
- Designer: Zenas King of King Bridge Company, Cleveland, Ohio
- Construction end: 1897

Statistics
- Daily traffic: 100
- Dearborn River High Bridge
- U.S. National Register of Historic Places
- Location within Montana Location within the United States
- Location: About 15 miles southwest of Augusta, Montana on Bean Lake Road
- Coordinates: 47°16′52″N 112°23′25″W
- Area: 9 acres (3.6 ha)
- Built: 1897, rehab 2003
- Architect: King Bridge Company
- Architectural style: Pratt half-deck truss
- NRHP reference No.: 03001298
- Added to NRHP: December 18, 2003

The Dearborn River High Bridge is a Pratt half-deck truss bridge built in 1897, and has been placed on the National Register of Historic Places as it is one of the few bridges of its type left standing in the United States. On a half-deck bridge, the deck is attached in the center rather than, as is more common, top or bottom of the superstructure. It crosses the Dearborn River on Lake Bean Road (Montana Secondary 435) about 15 miles (24 km) southwest of Augusta, Montana. The unusual design of the Dearborn River High Bridge suits it to carry light loads across high/deep crossings. It has four spans and a wooden plank deck. It is the last standing pin-connected Pratt half-deck truss bridge left in the United States. Construction cost was $9,997. Construction began in 1896 and completed in 1897.

This crossing point on the Dearborn River had been used for many years by the local Indian tribes, primarily the Blackfeet. Prior to the bridge's construction this location was known as the Ponderay Crossing. The river was named for United States Secretary of War Henry Dearborn by Lewis and Clark in 1805. The area was left largely unexplored by Europeans for the next 50 years or so. The bridge was rehabilitated in 2003 by the Montana Department of Transportation, with Sletten Construction of Great Falls, Montana as the lead contractor, and was placed on the National Register of Historic Places on December 18, 2003.

== See also ==
- List of bridges documented by the Historic American Engineering Record in Montana
- National Register of Historic Places listings in Lewis and Clark County, Montana
