= Snowden Bridge =

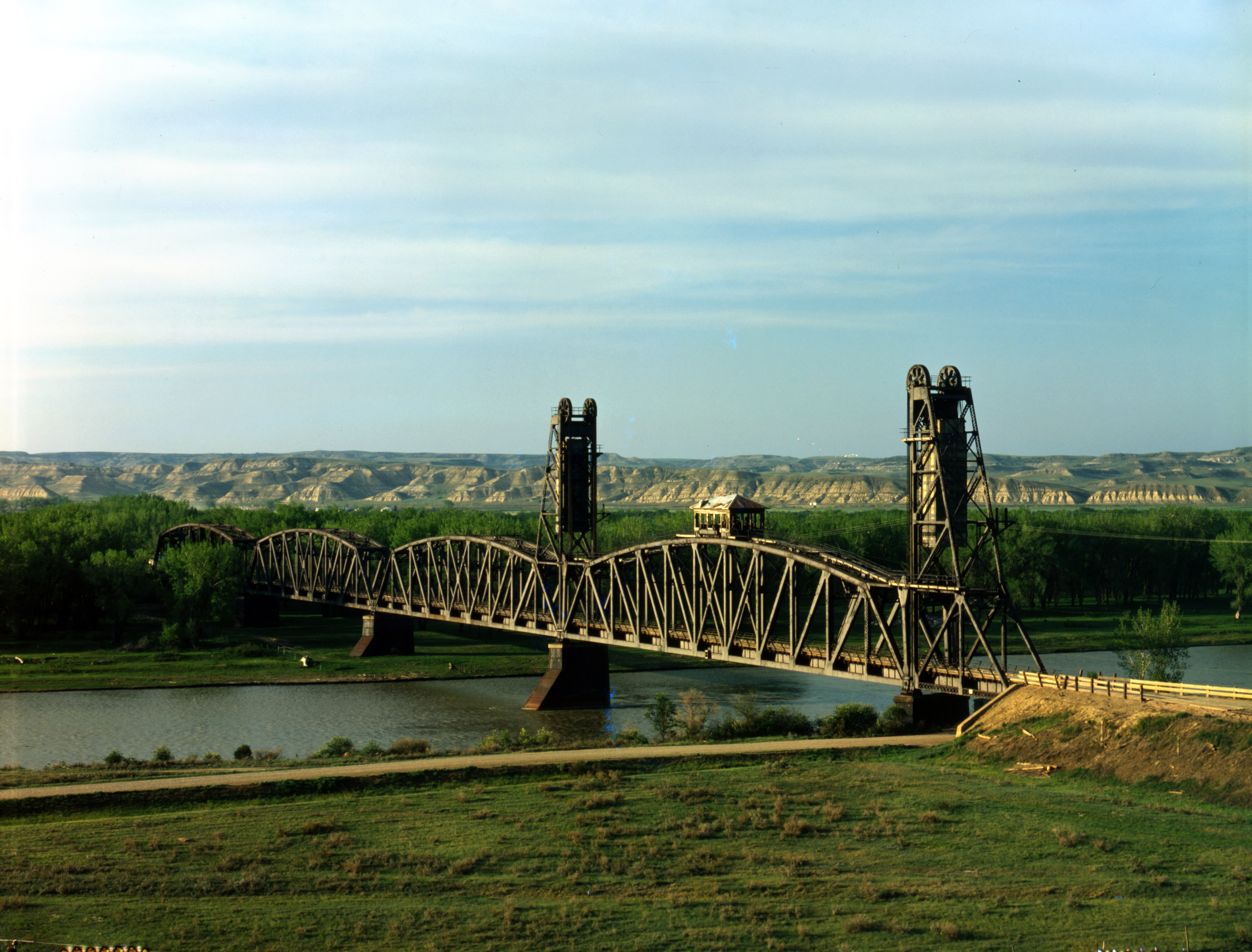
- Snowden Bridge over the Missouri River
- Coordinates: 48°00′00″N 104°05′44″W
- Carries: Rail traffic (formerly carried automobile traffic)
- Crosses: Missouri River
- Locale: Richland and Roosevelt counties Montana

Characteristics
- Design: Vertical-lift bridge
- Total length: 1,159 feet (353 m)
- Height: 108 feet (33 m) (towers)

History
- Construction end: December 1913

Statistics
- Toll: formerly tolled for automobiles

Snowden Bridge is a high-clearance, vertical-lift railroad bridge, built in 1913, that spans the Missouri River between Roosevelt and Richland Counties in Montana, USA, between Bainville and Fairview, Montana, and near Fort Union Trading Post National Historic Site and the ghost town of Mondak near Montana's eastern border with North Dakota. Snowden Bridge is a near twin of the Fairview Bridge, which crosses the Yellowstone River in North Dakota, both bridges having been built by Montana Eastern Railway within 10 miles (16 km) of each other over different rivers in different states.

The designer, John Alexander Low Waddell (1854–1938), based the Snowden Bridge on the South Halsted Street Bridge (1893) in Chicago. When completed, Snowden Bridge was the longest (1,159 feet (353 m)) vertical-lift bridge in the world. Its cost was $465,367, equivalent to at least $10,000,000 at the beginning of the 21st century.

The War Department required a movable span on the grounds that large steamboats might venture up the Missouri during the month or so that the river was navigable that far north. A kerosene engine in the lift house could raise it 43 feet (13 m) in about thirty minutes. In theory, the movable span might also be lifted by a hand-turned capstan. The span was last raised in 1935 and the lift machinery was removed in 1943.

In 1925, a plank roadbed was built for one-way vehicular and foot traffic, while the bridge continued to be used by the Great Northern Railroad. Although a long bridge with one-way traffic and shared with railroad trains should have been spectacularly hazardous, a 1981 study found that it was "so dangerous that it [was] safe" because drivers were extraordinarily cautious when crossing it.

In 1977, when the Burlington Northern moved to exclude motor vehicles from the bridge, funds for a modern road bridge were appropriated. Snowden Bridge remained usable for vehicular traffic until 1985, when the MonDak Bridge was completed nearby in North Dakota.

== See also ==
- List of bridges documented by the Historic American Engineering Record in Montana
