= Wiley, Clark & Greening Bank =

- U.S. National Register of Historic Places
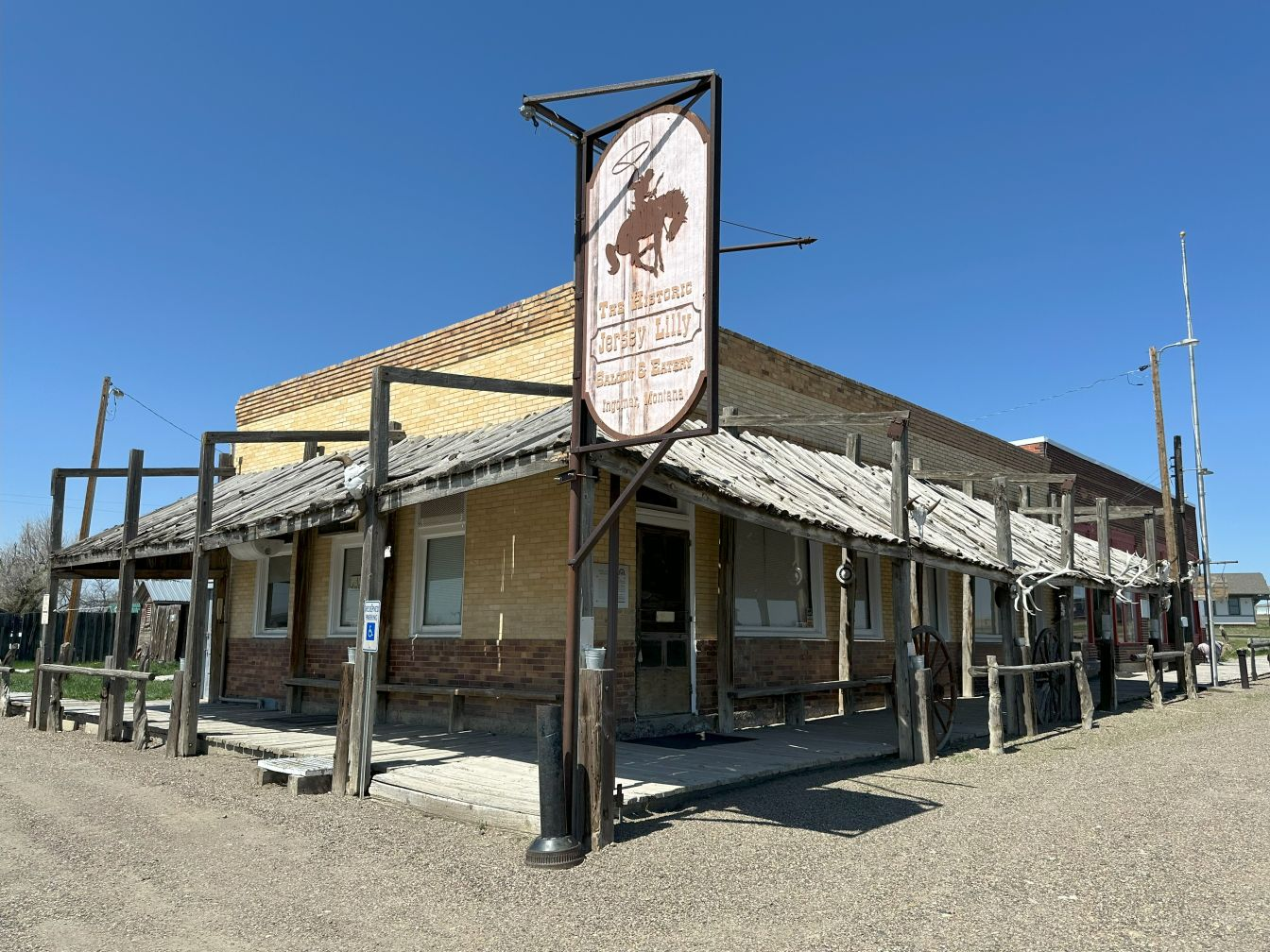
- The building in 2025

- Location within Montana Location within the United States
- Location: Main St. Ingomar, Montana
- Coordinates: 46°34′39″N 107°22′24″W
- Area: less than one acre
- Built: 1914
- Built by: C.J. Weston
- Architectural style: Western Commercial
- NRHP reference No.: 94001069
- Added to NRHP: September 2, 1994

The Wiley, Clark & Greening Bank, on Main St. in Ingomar, Montana, was built in 1914. It was listed on the National Register of Historic Places in 1994.

It is Western Commercial in style.

It was built as a bank building but was converted to a bar by 1948. It has been known as the Ingomar State Bank, the First National Bank of Ingomar, the Oasis Bar, and the Jersey Lilly Bar & Cafe.

The building is a tall one-story brick building with a partial basement. The southern part 25 by 30 feet (7.6 m × 9.1 m) portion of the building was built in 1914. An addition to the north, before 1920, brought the total size to 50 by 50 feet (15 m × 15 m).
