= Dearborn River =

River in the United States of America

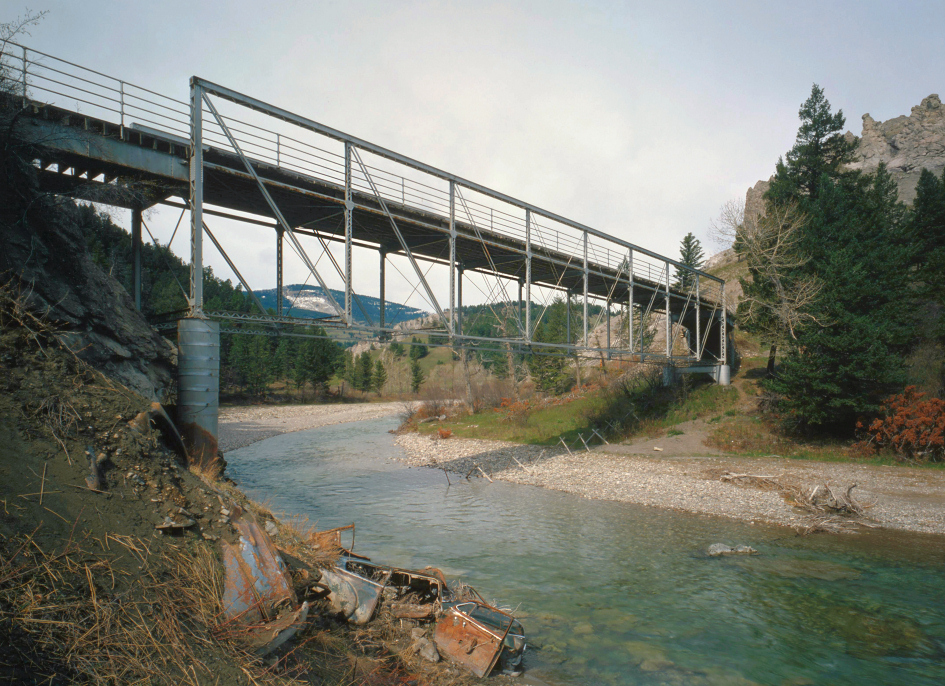

Location
- Country: Cascade and Lewis and Clark County, Montana

Physical characteristics
- Source
  - coordinates: 47°18′33″N 112°49′10″W
- Mouth
  - coordinates: 47°07′41″N 111°54′37″W
  - elevation: 3,432 feet (1,046 m)
- Length: 70 mi (110 km)
- Basin size: 410 mi^{2} (1,100 km^{2})
- Discharge
  - location: near Craig
  - average: 195 cu ft/s (5.5 m^{3}/s)

Basin features
- River system: Missouri River

The Dearborn River is a tributary of the Missouri River, approximately 70 mi (113 km) long, in central Montana in the United States. It rises in the Lewis and Clark National Forest, near Scapegoat Mountain in the Lewis and Clark Range of the Rocky Mountains at the continental divide, in western Lewis and Clark County. It flows generally southeast through secluded canyons, and joins the Missouri near Craig.

It is crossed by the Dearborn River High Bridge, which was constructed in 1897.

It is a popular destination for whitewater rafting and fly fishing. Whirling disease has become a significant problem among trout in the river.

The Dearborn is a Class I river for stream access for recreational purposes from the highway 431 bridge to its confluence with the Missouri river.

== See also ==
- List of rivers of Montana
- Montana Stream Access Law
