= Nohly, Montana =

Nohly
- Interactive map of Nohly
- Coordinates: 47.9956°N 104.0919°W
- Country: United States
- State: Montana
- County: Richland

Nohly is an unincorporated place in Richland County, Montana on the Missouri River and on a BNSF Railway line (originally the Great Northern Railway. The Library of Congress holds a collection of photographs of a vertical lift bridge in Nohly that spans the Missouri River, variously called the Snowden Bridge, Nohly Bridge, and Great Northern Railroad Bridge, built in 1913 for the Great Northern with subsequent construction work in 1925.

A water gage was installed in Nohly at coordinates 48°00'10"N, 104°05'30" W NAD27 in 1958. Records for the gage are maintained by the United States Geological Survey's North Dakota Water Science Center.

Nohly has a cemetery that is still maintained and formerly had a school and post office.
