= Ingomar, Montana =

Unincorporated community in Montana, U.S.

Coordinates: 46°34′36″N 107°22′20″W

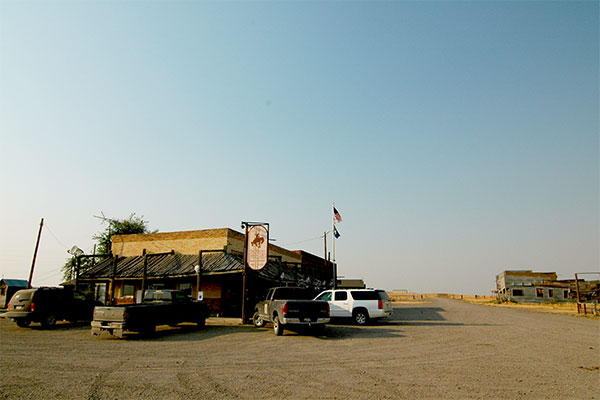
Main street of Ingomar

Ingomar is an unincorporated community in northwestern Rosebud County, Montana, United States, along the route of U.S. Route 12. The town was established in 1908, as a station stop on the Chicago, Milwaukee, St. Paul and Pacific Railroad, then under construction in Montana. Although the land around Ingomar attracted numerous homesteaders during the decade following the railroad's completion, the region proved to be far too arid and inhospitable for intensive agricultural use, and by the 1920s the town was in decline. The railroad through the area was abandoned in 1980, and only a handful of people remain in Ingomar today.

Three of the town's surviving buildings: the Ingomar Public School, J. A. Bookman General Store, and Wiley, Clark & Greening Bank have been listed on the National Register of Historic Places.

== Climate ==
According to the Köppen Climate Classification system, Ingomar has a cold semi-arid climate, abbreviated "BSk" on climate maps.

Climate data for Ingomar, Montana, 1991–2020 normals, extremes 1924–1954, 1956–present
| Month | Jan | Feb | Mar | Apr | May | Jun | Jul | Aug | Sep | Oct | Nov | Dec | Year |
|---|---|---|---|---|---|---|---|---|---|---|---|---|---|
| Record high °F (°C) | 70 (21) | 77 (25) | 82 (28) | 92 (33) | 100 (38) | 109 (43) | 116 (47) | 109 (43) | 106 (41) | 94 (34) | 78 (26) | 73 (23) | 116 (47) |
| Mean maximum °F (°C) | 54.3 (12.4) | 57.8 (14.3) | 70.4 (21.3) | 79.6 (26.4) | 86.1 (30.1) | 95.0 (35.0) | 100.7 (38.2) | 100.3 (37.9) | 95.5 (35.3) | 81.7 (27.6) | 67.4 (19.7) | 55.7 (13.2) | 102.0 (38.9) |
| Mean daily maximum °F (°C) | 32.0 (0.0) | 36.4 (2.4) | 48.1 (8.9) | 58.3 (14.6) | 68.3 (20.2) | 78.1 (25.6) | 88.3 (31.3) | 87.5 (30.8) | 75.9 (24.4) | 59.2 (15.1) | 45.4 (7.4) | 34.2 (1.2) | 59.3 (15.2) |
| Daily mean °F (°C) | 18.1 (−7.7) | 22.7 (−5.2) | 33.7 (0.9) | 43.7 (6.5) | 53.5 (11.9) | 63.2 (17.3) | 71.6 (22.0) | 69.8 (21.0) | 58.7 (14.8) | 44.2 (6.8) | 31.0 (−0.6) | 20.7 (−6.3) | 44.2 (6.8) |
| Mean daily minimum °F (°C) | 4.1 (−15.5) | 9.0 (−12.8) | 19.3 (−7.1) | 29.1 (−1.6) | 38.8 (3.8) | 48.3 (9.1) | 54.8 (12.7) | 52.1 (11.2) | 41.5 (5.3) | 29.3 (−1.5) | 16.6 (−8.6) | 7.1 (−13.8) | 29.2 (−1.6) |
| Mean minimum °F (°C) | −21.5 (−29.7) | −14.9 (−26.1) | −1.0 (−18.3) | 16.9 (−8.4) | 26.1 (−3.3) | 37.8 (3.2) | 46.4 (8.0) | 40.6 (4.8) | 28.8 (−1.8) | 13.3 (−10.4) | −5.8 (−21.0) | −16.1 (−26.7) | −29.7 (−34.3) |
| Record low °F (°C) | −49 (−45) | −55 (−48) | −38 (−39) | −15 (−26) | 10 (−12) | 27 (−3) | 31 (−1) | 30 (−1) | 13 (−11) | −17 (−27) | −38 (−39) | −54 (−48) | −55 (−48) |
| Average precipitation inches (mm) | 0.44 (11) | 0.41 (10) | 0.66 (17) | 1.55 (39) | 2.56 (65) | 2.30 (58) | 1.41 (36) | 1.02 (26) | 1.10 (28) | 1.19 (30) | 0.50 (13) | 0.41 (10) | 13.55 (343) |
| Average snowfall inches (cm) | 6.5 (17) | 4.9 (12) | 4.4 (11) | 1.9 (4.8) | 0.9 (2.3) | 0.0 (0.0) | 0.0 (0.0) | 0.0 (0.0) | 0.0 (0.0) | 1.7 (4.3) | 3.9 (9.9) | 5.7 (14) | 29.9 (75.3) |
| Average precipitation days (≥ 0.01 in) | 4.7 | 4.7 | 5.8 | 6.8 | 8.8 | 8.8 | 6.2 | 4.2 | 4.9 | 5.0 | 3.6 | 4.4 | 67.9 |
| Average snowy days (≥ 0.1 in) | 4.1 | 3.8 | 3.2 | 1.3 | 0.4 | 0.0 | 0.0 | 0.0 | 0.0 | 0.9 | 2.3 | 3.9 | 19.9 |
Source 1: NOAA
Source 2: National Weather Service
