= Scapegoat Mountain =

Mountain in Montana, United States

Coordinates: 47°18′36″N 112°49′45″W

Scapegoat Mountain is a summit in the Scapegoat Wilderness of Lewis and Clark County, Montana, in the United States. With an elevation of 9,202 feet (2,805 m), Scapegoat Mountain is the 443rd highest summit in the state of Montana. Scapegoat is the highest mountain on the Continental Divide within the Bob Marshall Wilderness Complex. Scapegoat is the highest peak in the 239,000-acre Scapegoat Wilderness.

The source of the Dearborn River is near Scapegoat Mountain.
