= Martin City, Montana =

Unincorporated community in Montana, United States

- Census-designated place
- Location of Martin City, Montana
- Coordinates: 48°23′37″N 114°01′51″W
- Country: United States
- State: Montana
- County: Flathead

Area
  - Total: 1.76 sq mi (4.56 km^{2})
  - Land: 1.73 sq mi (4.48 km^{2})
  - Water: 0.031 sq mi (0.08 km^{2})
- Elevation: 3,251 ft (991 m)

Population (2020)
  - Total: 461
  - Density: 266.7/sq mi (102.99/km^{2})
- Time zone: UTC-7 (Mountain (MST))
  - Summer (DST): UTC-6 (MDT)
- ZIP code: 59926
- Area code: 406
- FIPS code: 30-48100
- GNIS feature ID: 2408187

Martin City is an unincorporated community and census-designated place (CDP) in Flathead County, Montana, United States. As of the 2020 census, Martin City had a population of 461.

Martin City owes its existence to the early 1950s construction of the Hungry Horse Dam.

== Geography ==
Martin City is located in central Flathead County between Hungry Horse to the southwest and Coram to the north. U.S. Route 2 passes through the community, leading northeast 9 miles (14 km) to West Glacier and southwest 24 miles (39 km) to Kalispell.

According to the United States Census Bureau, the CDP has a total area of 1.7 square miles (4.5 km^{2}), of which 0.02 square miles (0.05 km^{2}), or 1.16%, is water. Martin City is located on the east side of the Flathead River.

== Demographics ==
Historical population
| Census | Pop. | Note | %± |
|---|---|---|---|
| 2000 | 331 | | — |
| 2010 | 500 | | 51.1% |
| 2020 | 461 | | −7.8% |
U.S. Decennial Census

As of the census of 2000, there were 331 people, 142 households, and 94 families residing in the CDP. The population density was 696.2 inhabitants per square mile (268.8/km^{2}). There were 163 housing units at an average density of 342.8 per square mile (132.4/km^{2}). The racial makeup of the CDP was 88.52% White, 8.46% Native American, 0.30% from other races, and 2.72% from two or more races. Hispanic or Latino of any race were 0.60% of the population.

There were 142 households, out of which 30.3% had children under the age of 18 living with them, 53.5% were married couples living together, 7.0% had a female householder with no husband present, and 33.1% were non-families. 28.9% of all households were made up of individuals, and 9.2% had someone living alone who was 65 years of age or older. The average household size was 2.33 and the average family size was 2.82.

In the CDP, the population was spread out, with 23.3% under the age of 18, 7.3% from 18 to 24, 29.9% from 25 to 44, 31.4% from 45 to 64, and 8.2% who were 65 years of age or older. The median age was 41 years. For every 100 females, there were 103.1 males. For every 100 females age 18 and over, there were 108.2 males.

The median income for a household in the CDP was $21,250, and the median income for a family was $31,500. Males had a median income of $23,500 versus $11,458 for females. The per capita income for the CDP was $12,896. About 13.8% of families and 24.4% of the population were below the poverty line, including 29.2% of those under age 18 and none of those age 65 or over.

== Nearby points of interest ==
- Glacier National Park
- Hungry Horse Dam
- Bad Rock Canyon
