= List of botanical gardens and arboretums in Montana =

This list of botanical gardens and arboretums in Montana is intended to include all significant botanical gardens and arboretums in the U.S. state of Montana

Name	Image	Affiliation	City
Official State Arboretum		University of Montana	Missoula
Gatiss Gardens			Kalispell
International Larix Arboretum			Hungry Horse
Montana Arboretum and Gardens		Montana State University	Bozeman
Tizer Botanic Gardens & Arboretum			Jefferson City
Botanical Gardens of ZooMontana		ZooMontana	Billings
Yellowstone Arboretum of ZooMontana		ZooMontana	Billings

== See also ==
- List of botanical gardens and arboretums in the United States
