= Tepee Creek =

Tepee Creek may refer to:

- Tepee Creek (Montana)
- Tepee Creek (Fall River County, South Dakota)
- Tepee Creek (Meade and Miner counties, South Dakota)
