= Bad Rock Canyon =

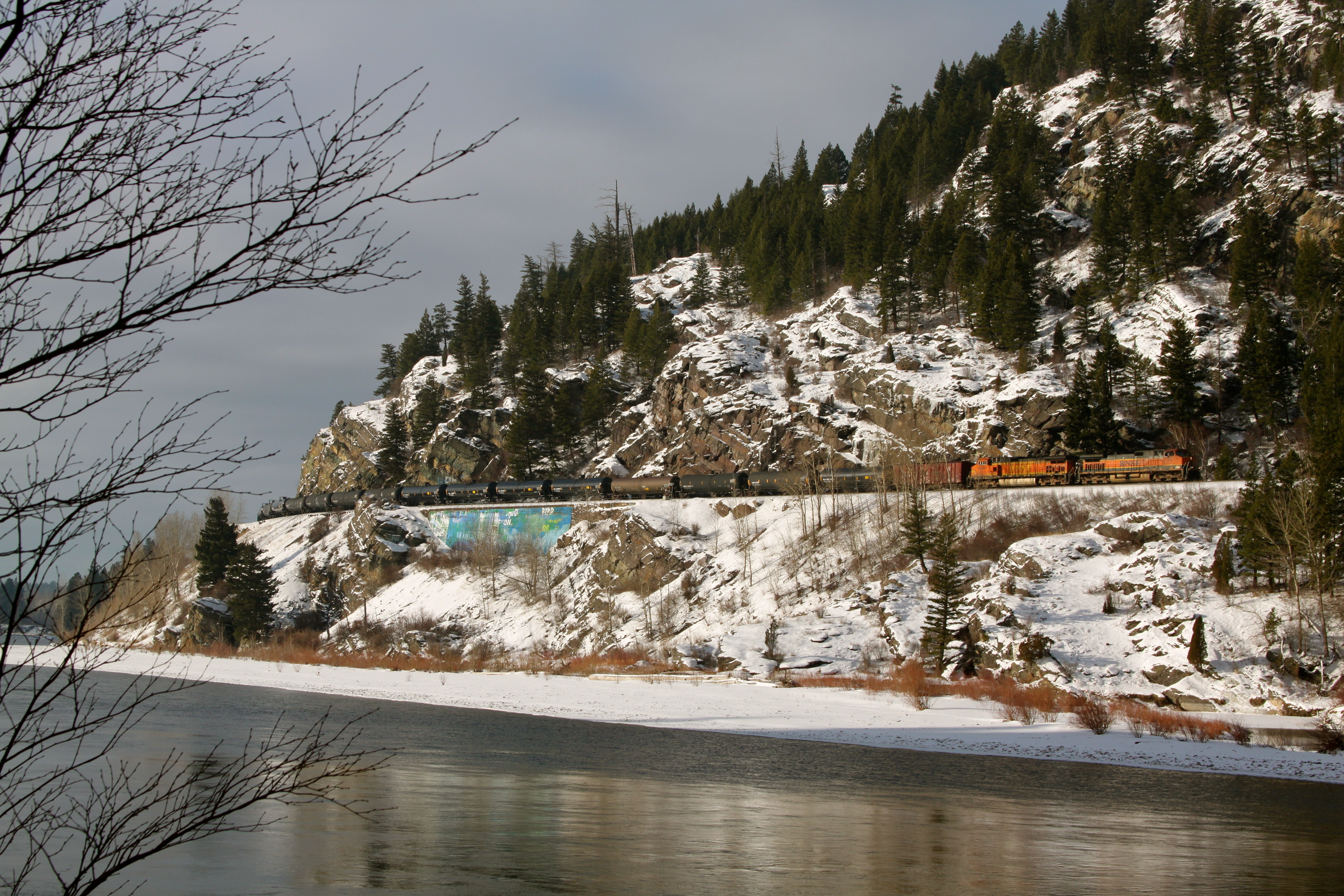
- A view of the Flathead River flowing west through Bad Rock Canyon and a BNSF eastbound oil train.

- Location within Montana
- Floor elevation: approx. 2,910 feet (900 m)
- Length: 2.75 miles (4.43 km)
- Width: .25 to .50 miles (0.40 to 0.80 km)

Geography
- Location: Montana, United States
- Coordinates: 48°23′09″N 114°06′30″W
- Rivers: Flathead River
- Interactive map of Bad Rock Canyon

Bad Rock Canyon is a river canyon lying 2.64 miles (4.25 km) east of Columbia Falls, Montana. The Flathead River, flanked by U.S. Highway 2, flows through the canyon and enters Montana's Flathead Valley. Rock slides occur frequently along the northern side of the BNSF Railway tracks that run through the canyon.

== History ==
For centuries the canyon was a part of the buffalo trail leading through the Rocky Mountains to the buffalo hunting grounds on the Great Plains. Towns nearest the canyon are Hungry Horse immediately to the east and Martin City farther to the east. The town of Coram lies a few miles farther northeast, about 5 miles from the western entrance of Glacier National Park at West Glacier, Montana.

=== Indian buffalo hunts ===
The plateau tribes—Kalispel, Pend d'Oreilles (Upper Kalispel), Spokane, Coeur d'Alene, and Kootenai—as well as the nearby Flathead tribe would pass through this area for their buffalo hunts. Plains tribes, primarily the Blackfeet, would travel through the area seeking to capture the good horses raised by the western tribes. Oral tradition suggests that some battles may have taken place in the canyon.

=== Gateway to wilderness areas ===
Bad Rock Canyon is the entryway to the Bob Marshall Wilderness, the Hungry Horse Dam and Hungry Horse Recreation Area, and Glacier National Park. The U.S. Highway 2 pull-off area within the canyon has some interesting water features, particularly when frozen. There is a spring on the south side of the canyon that is used as a water source by many local residents.

=== Rock slides ===
Frequent rock slides occur along the northern side of the BNSF Railway tracks that traverse through the canyon. Railway slide fences have been installed by the railroad to detect and prevent slides from damaging the rails or hitting trains that are passing through the canyon. Rock slides also occur on the U.S. Highway 2 side of the canyon, but less frequently due to rock formation stabilization efforts.
