= List of rivers of Montana =

The following is a partial list of rivers of Montana (U.S. state).

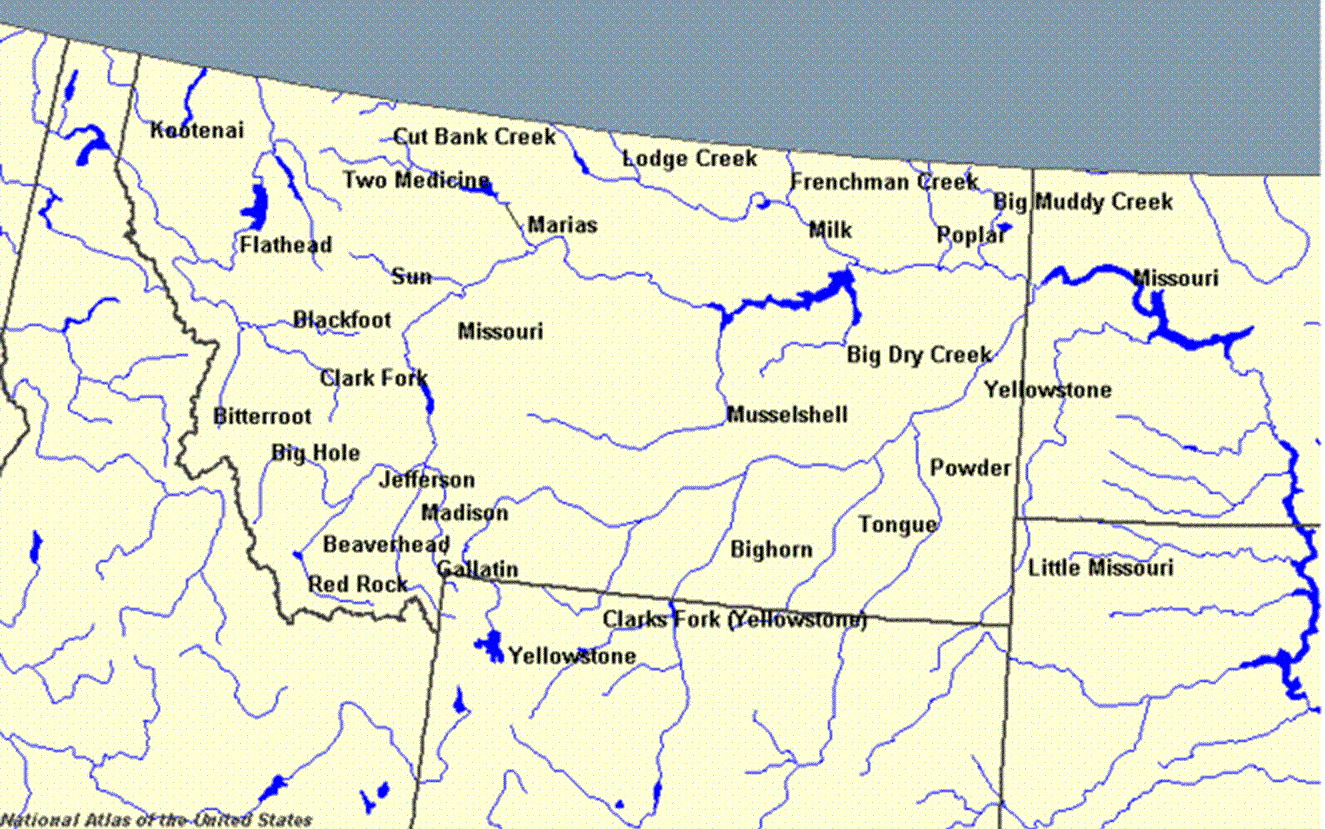
Map of principal rivers of Montana

== East of Continental Divide ==
Water in these rivers flows east and south from the Continental Divide of the Americas, also known as the Great Divide, into the Gulf of Mexico via the Missouri and Mississippi rivers.

=== Missouri River watershed ===
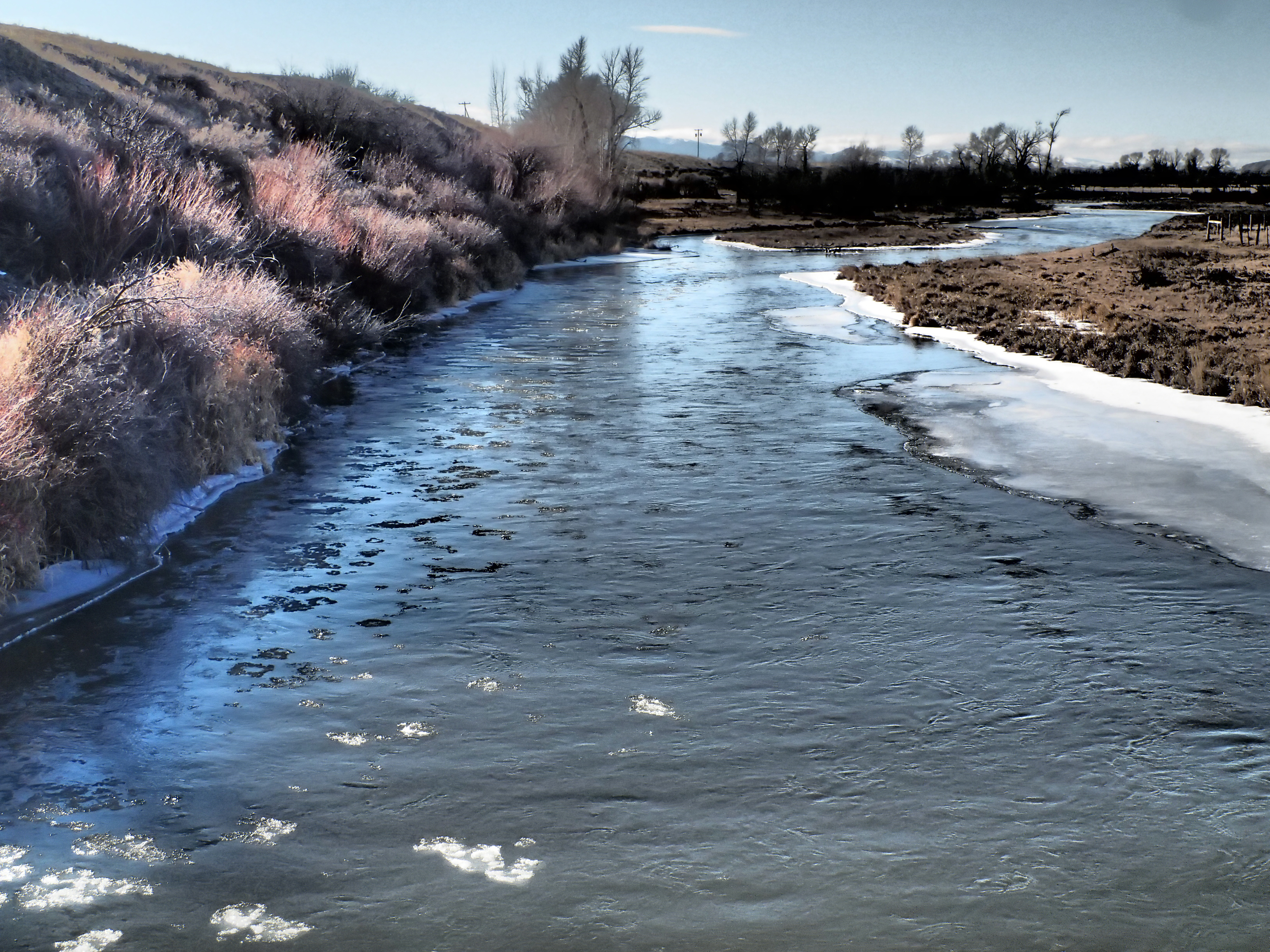
Beaverhead River near Twin Bridges

- Missouri River
  - Jefferson River
    - Beaverhead River
      - Blacktail Deer Creek
      - Ruby River
      - Red Rock River
    - Big Hole River
      - Wise River
    - Boulder River
  - Roe River (one of the shortest rivers in the world)
  - Madison River
  - Gallatin River
    - East Gallatin River
  - Sixteen Mile Creek
  - Dearborn River
  - Smith River
  - Sun River
  - Belt Creek
  - Marias River

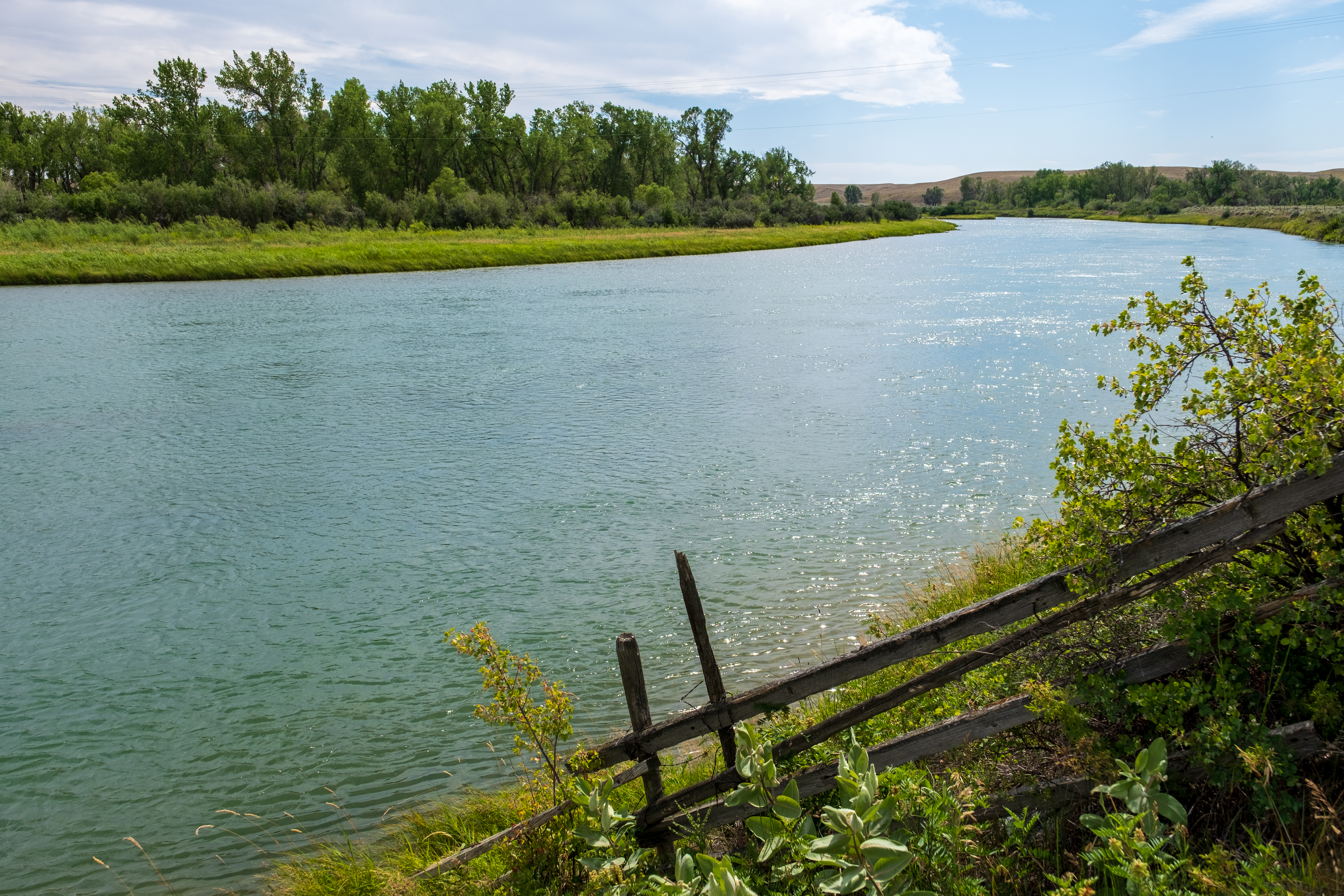
Marias River at Moffat Bridge Recreation Area

    - Cut Bank Creek
    - Two Medicine River
      - Birch Creek
        - Dupuyer Creek
    - Teton River

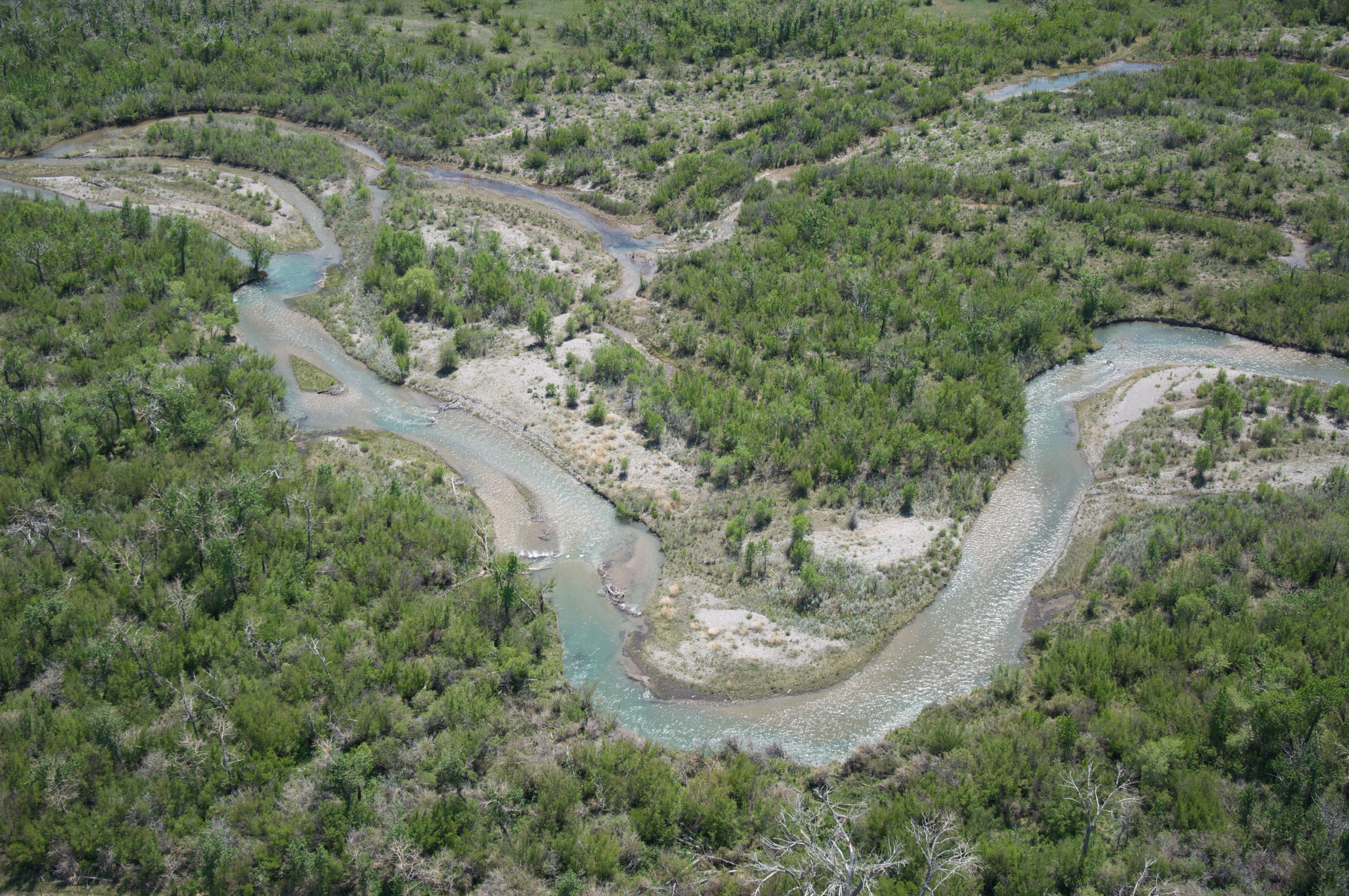
Teton River

    - Cottonwood Creek (Liberty County, Montana)
  - Arrow Creek
  - Cow Creek
  - Birch Creek
  - Judith River
    - Dry Wolf Creek
  - Musselshell River
    - Sacagawea River
    - North Fork Musselshell River
    - South Fork Musselshell River
  - Milk River
    - Big Sandy Creek
    - Frenchman River
    - Battle Creek
    - Rock Creek
  - Redwater River
  - Poplar River
  - Big Muddy Creek
  - Little Muddy Creek
  - Yellowstone River
    - Gardner River
    - DePuy Spring Creek
    - Shields River

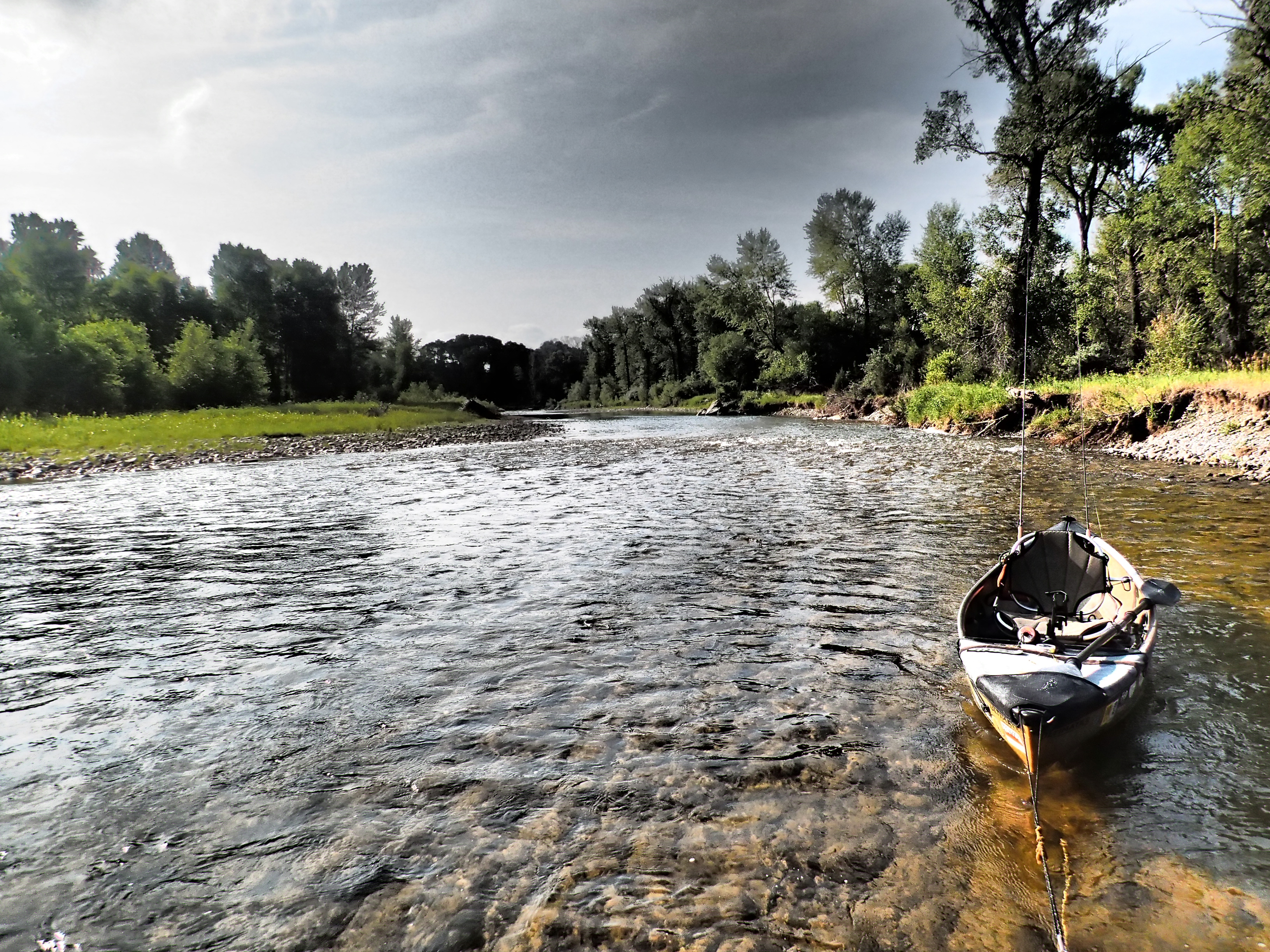
Shields River in Park County

    - Boulder River
    - Sweet Grass Creek
    - Stillwater River

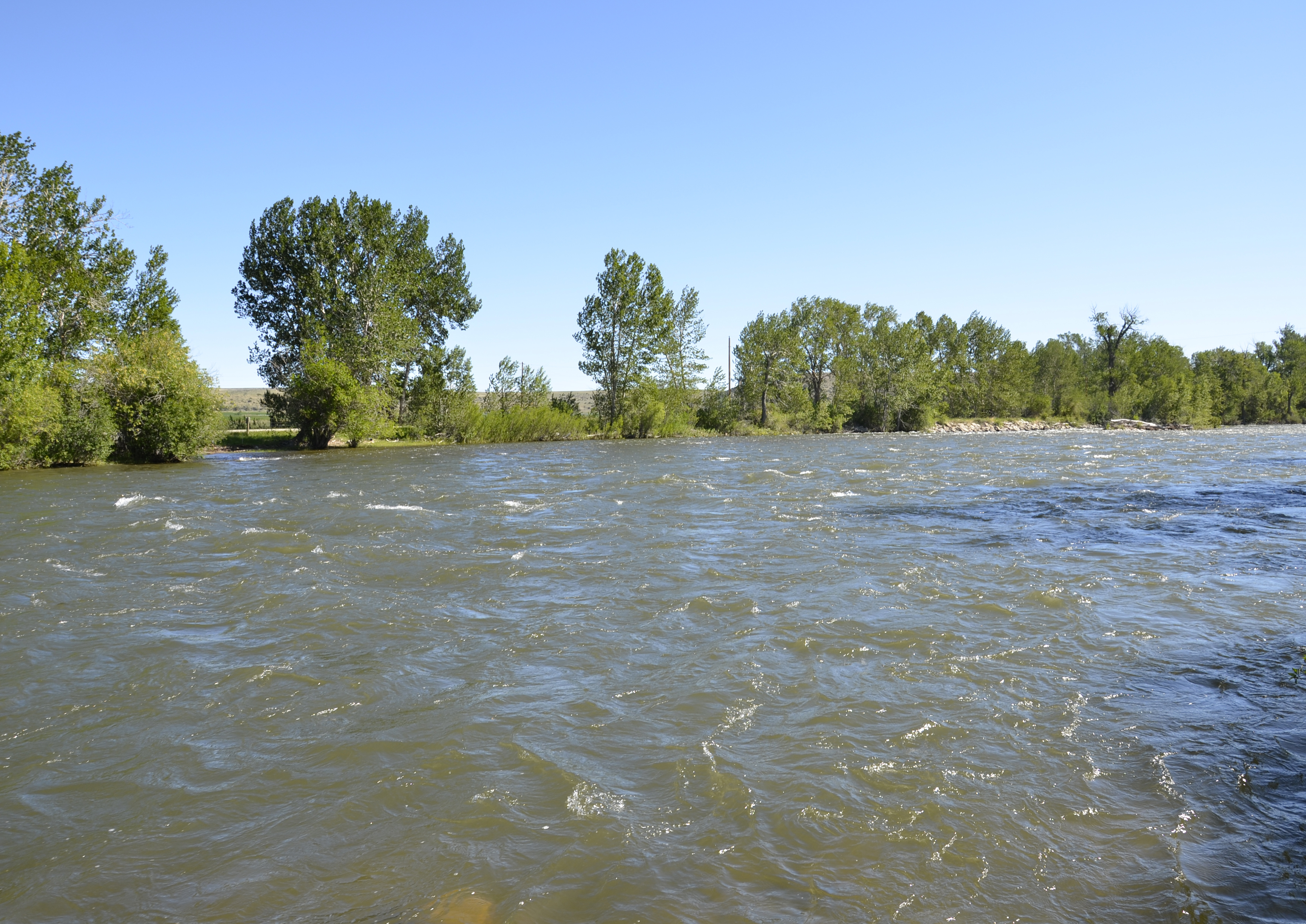
Stillwater River north of Absarokee

    - Clarks Fork Yellowstone River
      - Rock Creek
    - Bighorn River
      - Beauvais Creek
      - Big Bull Elk Creek
      - Black Canyon Creek
      - Dry Head Creek
      - Grapevine Creek
      - Little Bighorn River
        - Alligator Creek
        - Lodge Grass Creek
        - Pass Creek
        - Reno Creek
        - Shoulder Blade Creek
        - West Fork Little Bighorn River
      - Little Bull Elk Creek
      - Rotten Grass Creek
      - Soap Creek
      - War Man Creek
      - Woody Creek
    - Tongue River

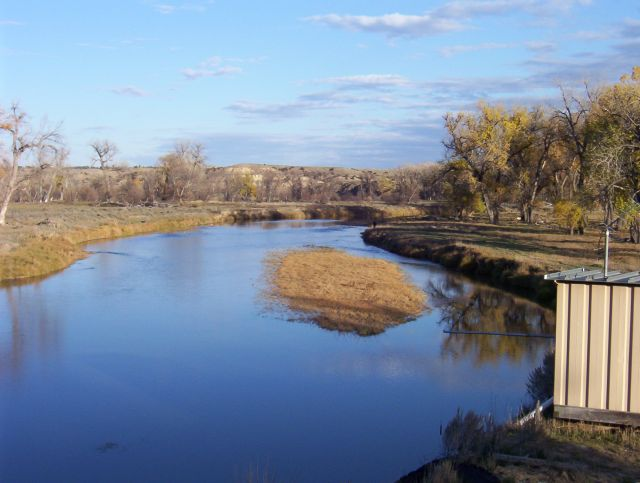
Tongue River

      - Pumpkin Creek
    - Powder River
      - Little Powder River
        - East Fork Little Powder River
      - Crow Creek
      - Timber Creek
      - Spring Creek
      - Ash Creek
      - Mizpah Creek
      - Sheep Creek
      - Locate Creek
    - O'Fallon Creek
    - Cabin Creek
  - Little Missouri River
    - Thompson Creek

== Laurentian Divide ==
Waters in these rivers flow north and east from the Laurentian Divide into Hudson Bay, a tributary of the Arctic Ocean, via the Saskatchewan and Nelson rivers.

- Belly River
- St. Mary River
- Waterton River

== West of Continental Divide ==
Water in these rivers flow west from the Continental Divide of the Americas into the Pacific Ocean via the Columbia River.

- Clark Fork River
  - Rock Creek
  - Bull River

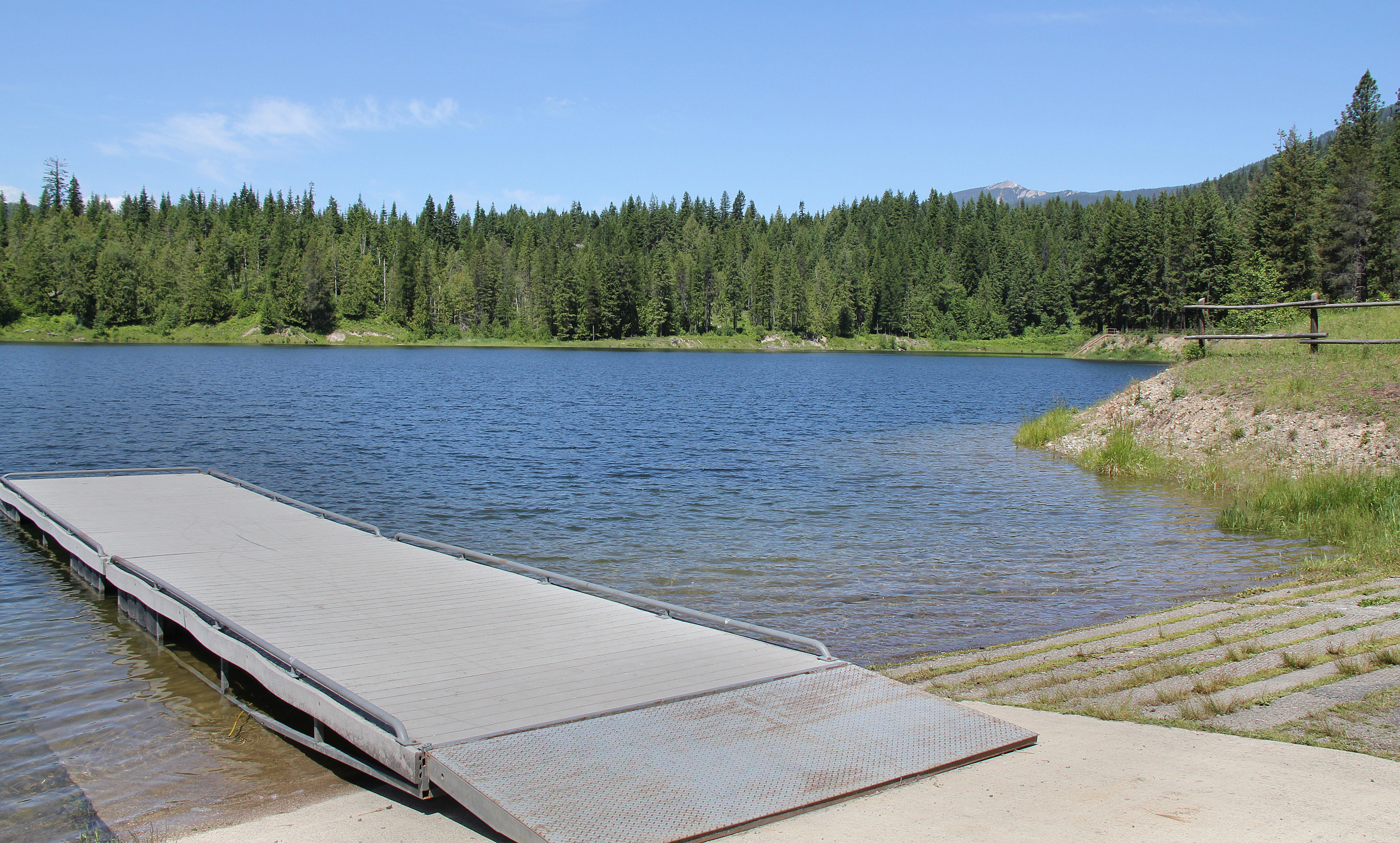
Bull River campground near Idaho border

  - Thompson River
    - Little Thompson River
  - Vermilion River
    - Queer Creek
  - Flathead River

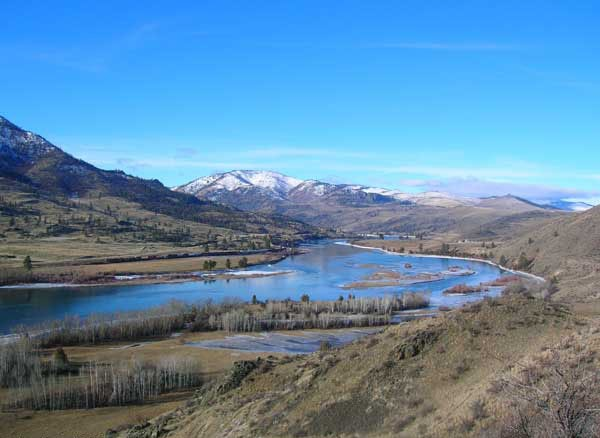
Flathead River near Perma

    - Jocko River
    - Little Bitterroot River
    - Spotted Bear River
    - White River
    - Whitefish River
      - Stillwater River
    - South Fork Flathead River
    - North Fork Flathead River
    - Middle Fork Flathead River
      - Graves Creek
        - Aeneas Creek
  - St. Regis River
  - Bitterroot River
  - Blackfoot River
  - Little Blackfoot River
- Kootenai River
  - Yaak River

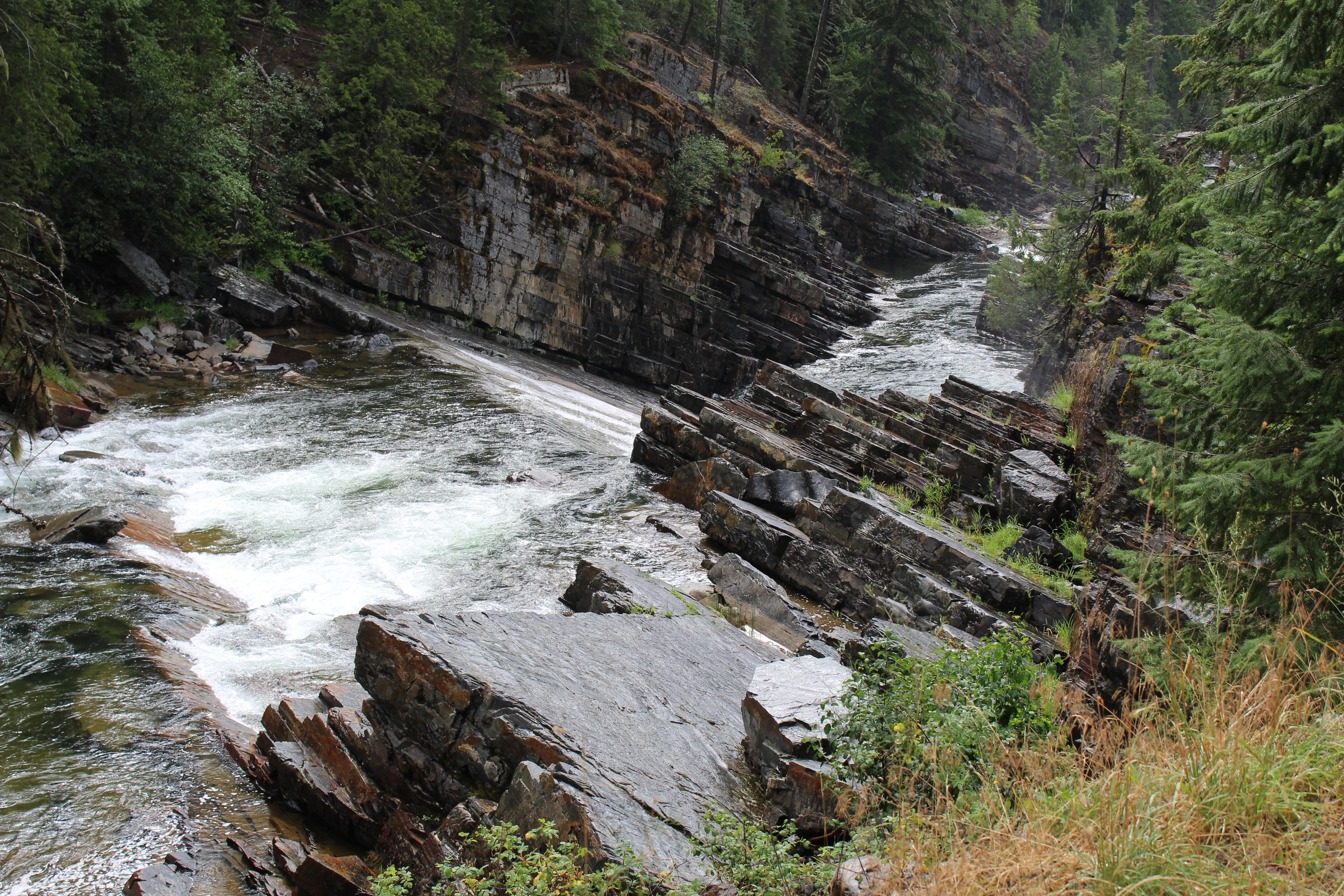
Lower Yaak Falls on the Yaak River

  - Fisher River
  - Ninemile Creek
  - Tobacco River
  - Wigwam River
- Swan River

== Multiple streams with same name ==
- Willow Creek, there are 45 streams named Willow Creek in Montana

== See also ==
- Montana Stream Access Law
- List of rivers in the United States
