= List of lakes of Teton County, Montana =

There are at least 30 named lakes and reservoirs in Teton County, Montana.

== Lakes ==
- Basin Lake, 47°36′42″N 112°17′48″W, el. 4,367 feet (1,331 m)
- Davis Lake, 47°40′15″N 112°01′47″W, el. 3,770 feet (1,150 m)
- Eyraud Lakes, 47°59′09″N 112°02′05″W, el. 3,763 feet (1,147 m)
- Freezout Lake, 47°40′00″N 112°03′03″W, el. 3,766 feet (1,148 m)
- Glendora Lake, 47°52′59″N 112°14′23″W, el. 3,999 feet (1,219 m)
- Lake Theboe, 47°47′51″N 112°34′04″W, el. 4,675 feet (1,425 m)
- Middle Lake, 47°59′00″N 112°02′15″W, el. 3,747 feet (1,142 m)
- Our Lake, 47°50′12″N 112°48′39″W, el. 7,283 feet (2,220 m)
- Pond Number Five, 47°40′40″N 112°02′19″W, el. 3,770 feet (1,150 m)
- Pond Number Four, 47°42′00″N 112°04′16″W, el. 3,770 feet (1,150 m)
- Pond Number One, 47°42′53″N 112°03′52″W, el. 3,773 feet (1,150 m)
- Pond Number Six, 47°39′35″N 112°01′29″W, el. 3,770 feet (1,150 m)
- Pond Number Three, 47°42′00″N 112°03′36″W, el. 3,770 feet (1,150 m)
- Pond Number Two, 47°42′11″N 112°03′04″W, el. 3,773 feet (1,150 m)
- Priest Butte Lake, 47°46′00″N 112°06′53″W, el. 3,766 feet (1,148 m)
- Reickoff Lakes, 47°50′33″N 112°15′37″W, el. 4,062 feet (1,238 m)
- Round Lake, 47°58′41″N 112°02′01″W, el. 3,753 feet (1,144 m)
- Split Rock Lake, 47°39′40″N 112°31′23″W, el. 4,298 feet (1,310 m)
- Tunnel Lake, 47°38′58″N 112°35′57″W, el. 4,327 feet (1,319 m)
- Twin Lakes, 47°53′32″N 112°36′20″W, el. 4,777 feet (1,456 m)

== Reservoirs ==
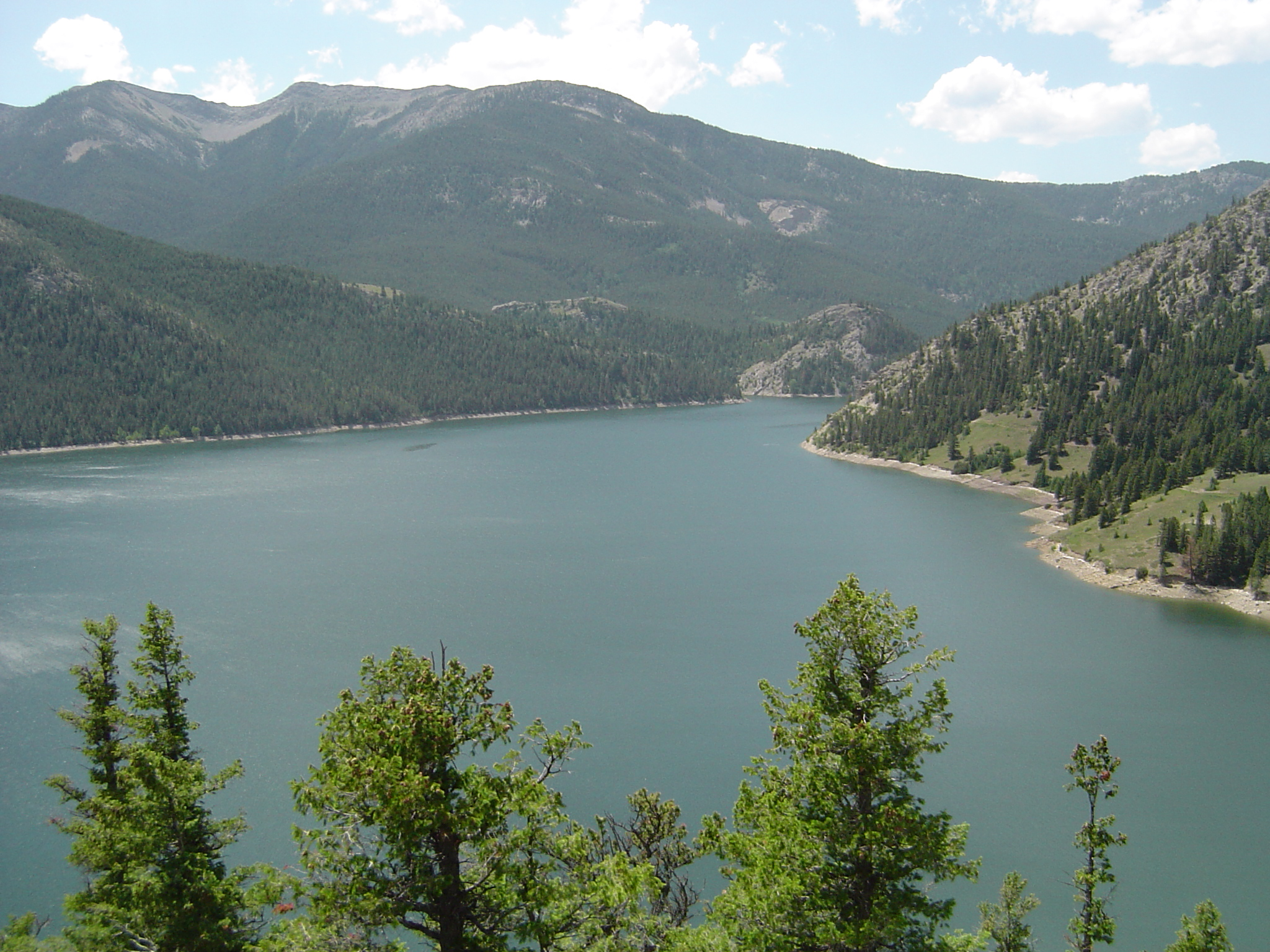
Gibson Reservoir, Montana

- Burd Hill Lake, 47°46′36″N 112°14′57″W, el. 3,996 feet (1,218 m)
- Bynum Reservoir, 47°57′44″N 112°24′30″W, el. 4,167 feet (1,270 m)
- Dougcliff Reservoir, 47°48′33″N 112°22′37″W, el. 4,268 feet (1,301 m)
- Eureka Reservoir, 47°52′42″N 112°19′04″W, el. 4,124 feet (1,257 m)
- Farmers Reservoir, 47°55′14″N 112°21′59″W, el. 4,203 feet (1,281 m)
- Gibson Reservoir, 47°36′12″N 112°45′39″W, el. 4,869 feet (1,484 m)
- Harvey Lake, 47°55′45″N 112°23′39″W, el. 4,229 feet (1,289 m)
- John Lane Reservoir, 47°46′48″N 112°36′33″W, el. 4,947 feet (1,508 m)
- Pishkun Reservoir, 47°40′36″N 112°29′41″W, el. 4,373 feet (1,333 m)
- Theboe Lake, 47°47′42″N 112°34′03″W, el. 4,678 feet (1,426 m)

== See also ==
- List of lakes in Montana
