= Graves Creek (South Fork Flathead River tributary) =

Stream in Montana, USA

Graves Creek Tributary to South Fork Flathead River
- Location of Graves Creek mouth Graves Creek (South Fork Flathead River tributary) (the United States)

Location
- Country: United States
- State: Montana
- County: Flathead

Physical characteristics
- Source: Aeneas Creek divide
  - location: about 1-mile southeast of Black Lake
  - coordinates: 48°09′15.05″N 113°54′47.39″W
  - elevation: 6,820 ft (2,080 m)
- Mouth: South Fork Flathead River
  - location: Mount Aeneas
  - coordinates: 48°09′13.2″N 113°55′36.7″W
  - elevation: 3,570 ft (1,090 m)
- Length: 12.25 mi (19.71 km)
- Basin size: 36.50 square miles (94.5 km^{2})
- Discharge
  - location: South Fork Flathead River in an impoundment of the Hungry Horse Dam.
  - average: 113.55 cu ft/s (3.215 m^{3}/s) at mouth with South Fork Flathead River

Basin features
- Progression: South Fork Flathead River → Flathead River → → Clark Fork → Pend Oreille River → Columbia River → Pacific Ocean
- River system: Flathead River
- Tributaries
  - left: Mazie Creek
  - right: Aeneas Creek; Baker Creek
- Waterbodies: Black Lake; Unnamed Lake; Hankerchief Lake
- Bridges: West Side South Fork Road

Graves Creek is a stream in the U.S. state of Montana. It is a tributary to South Fork Flathead River within an impoundment of the same river.

== Course ==
Graves Creek rises about 1 mile (1.6 km) east of Black Lake in Flathead County, Montana, and then flows generally east and southeast to join South Fork Flathead River about 10 miles (16 km) east of Mud Lake.

== Watershed ==
Graves Creek drains 36.50 square miles (94.53 km^{2}) of area, receives 59.163 inches (1,502.75 mm) of precipitation per year, and is about 76.83% forested.

== See also ==
- List of rivers of Montana
