= Corona Creek =

Corona Creek may refer to:

- Corona Creek, Montana, United States, a tributary of the Little Thompson River (Montana)
- Corona Creek, Saskatchewan, Canada, a tributary of the North Saskatchewan River
