= McGinnis Creek =

McGinnis Creek may refer to several creeks in the United States of America:

- Little McGinnis Creek, Rosebud County, Montana
- McGinnis Creek (Alaska)
- McGinnis Creek (Humboldt County), California
- McGinnis Creek (San Luis Obispo County), California
- McGinnis Creek (Idaho)
- McGinnis Creek (Flathead County), Montana
- McGinnis Creek (Lincoln County), Montana
- McGinnis Creek (Missoula County), Montana
- McGinnis Creek (Rosebud County), Montana
- McGinnis Creek (Sanders County), Montana
- McGinnis Creek (Crook County), Oregon
- McGinnis Creek (Douglas County), Oregon
- McGinnis Creek (Wheeler County), Oregon
- McGinnis Creek (Washington)
- McGinnis Creek (Wisconsin)
