= Baking Powder Creek =

Stream in Montana, United States

Coordinates: 47°06′50″N 112°34′17″W

Baking Powder Creek is a stream in Lewis and Clark County, Montana, in the United States. The creek ends upon merging with Falls Creek.

Baking Powder Creek is noted for fishing of cutthroat trout.

== See also ==
- List of rivers of Montana
