= Thomson River =

Thomson River may refer to:

== Places ==
- Thomson River (Queensland), western Queensland, Australia
- Thomson River (Victoria), Victoria, Australia

== See also ==
- Thompson River, British Columbia, Canada
- Thompson River (Missouri)
- Thompson River (Montana)
