= Spring Creek (Teton County, Montana) =

Stream in Montana, United States

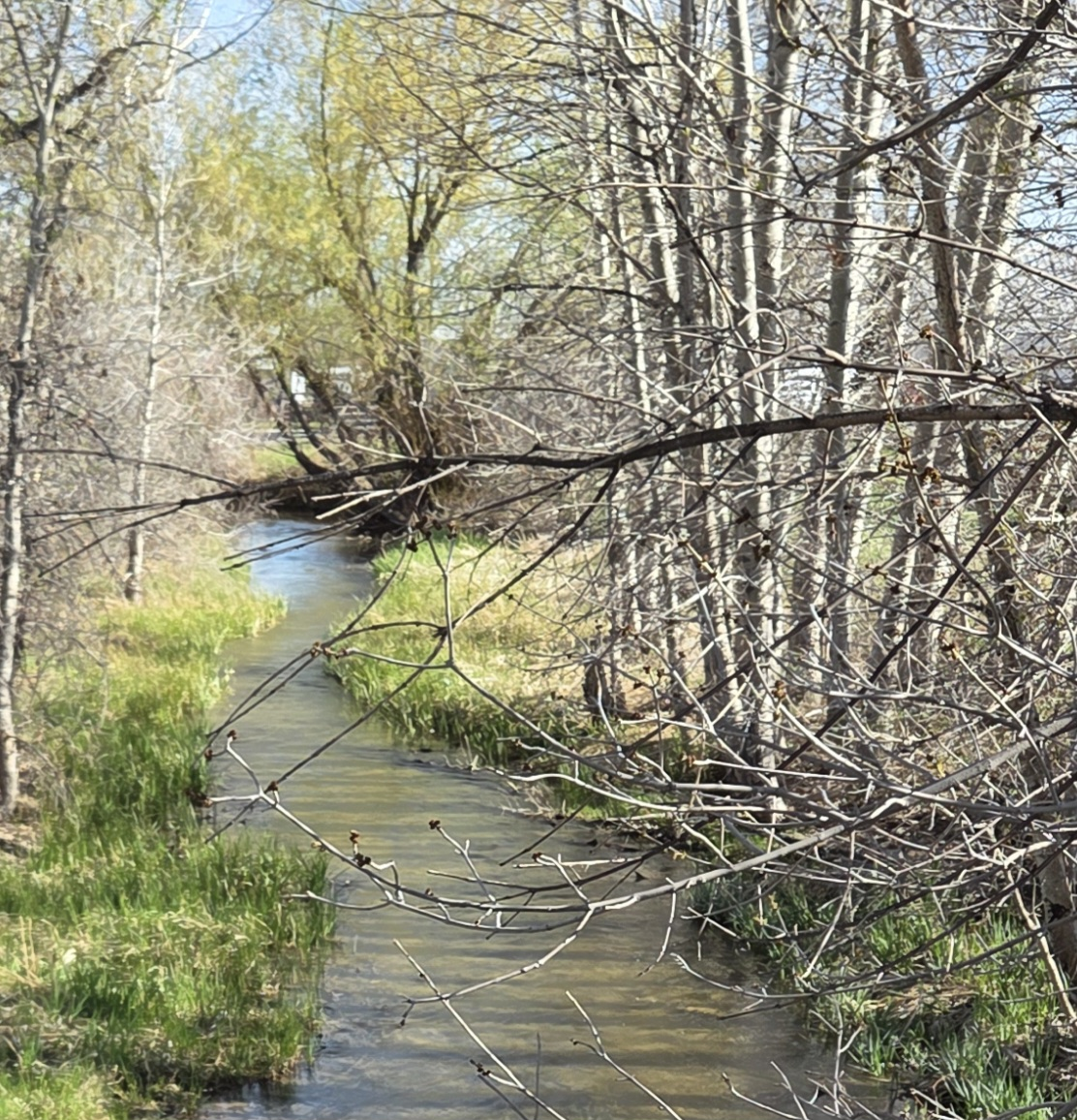
- Spring Creek in Choteau City Park

Location
- State: Montana
- County: Teton County
- Region: Central Montana

Physical characteristics
- Source: Unknown
  - coordinates: 47.871169°N 112.254365°W
- 2nd source: Agency Creek
  - coordinates: 47.831970°N 112.197092°W
- Mouth: Teton River
  - coordinates: 47.78624°N 112.13195°W

Basin features
- River system: Teton
- Cities: Choteau Montana

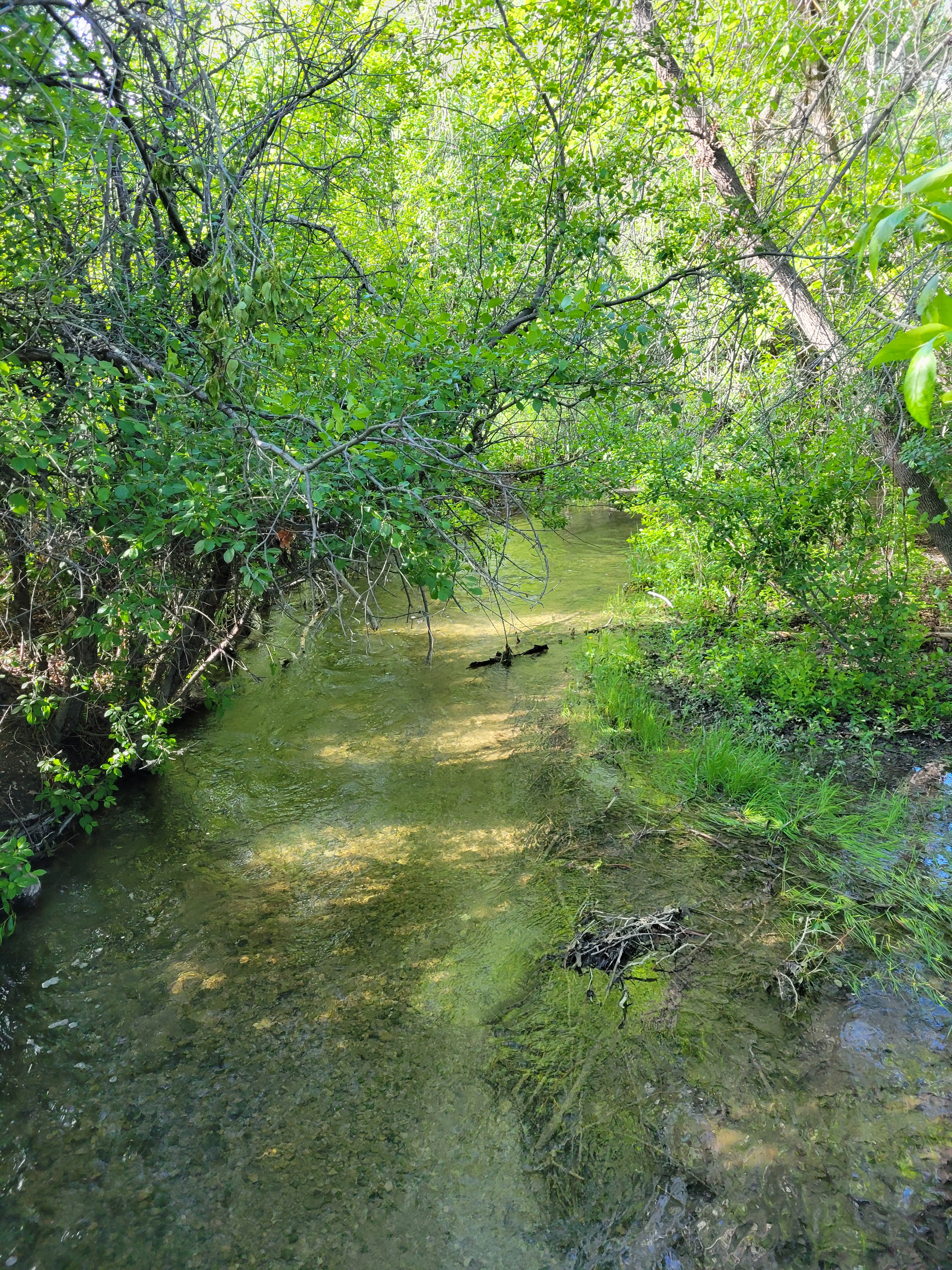
a picture of Spring Creek as it flows by a dense patch of vegetation in the Choteau City Park

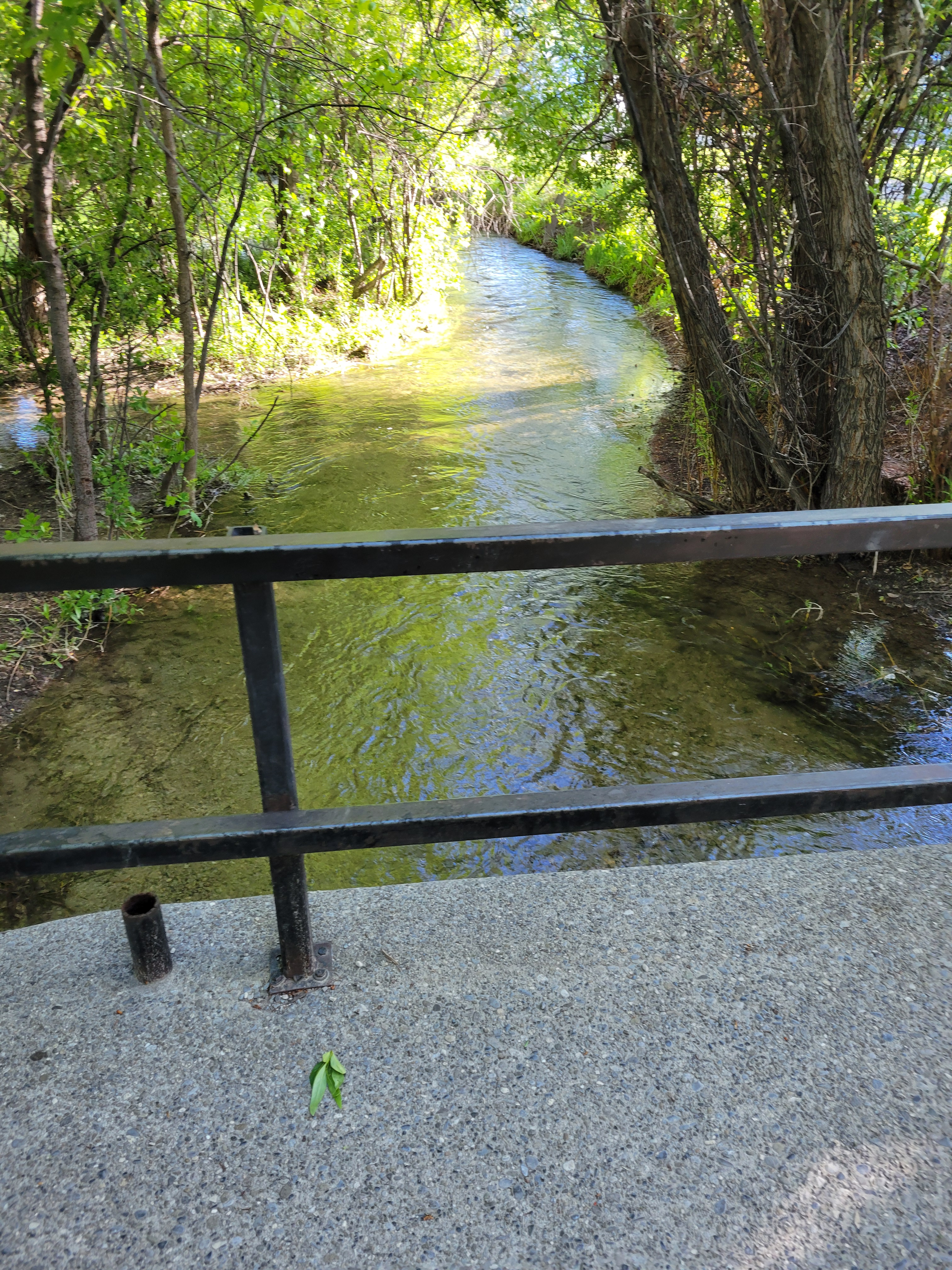
a picture of Spring Creek in the Choteau Montana city park as it flows under a walking bridge

Spring Creek is a stream in the city of Choteau, Montana. The stream has been known for causing large ice jams, and its opportunities for fishing and recreation in the Choteau City Park.

== Creek course ==
The creek's source starts near the Eureka Reservoir. It then flows south into the city of Choteau, and into the Choteau City Park. It then flows into the Teton River.

== Extremities ==
Spring creek has suffered seven ice jams, most recently in January 2020. A majority of the jams caused minor flooding, with some instances of sewer backups and minor damage to homes and roads.

== Species ==
The Montana Department of Fish, Wildlife and Parks has identified seven species of fish in the creek: brook trout, longnose dace, longnose sucker, mottled sculpin, mountain sucker, rainbow trout and white sucker.

== See also ==
- Teton River
- Teton County
- Choteau Montana
- Eureka Reservoir
- Big Spring Creek
