= Aeneas Creek =

Stream in Montana, USA

Aeneas Creek Tributary to Graves Creek
- Location of Aeneas Creek mouth Aeneas Creek (the United States)

Location
- Country: United States
- State: Montana
- County: Flathead

Physical characteristics
- Source: Birch Creek divide
  - location: Aeneas Lake
  - coordinates: 48°08′20″N 113°54′28″W
  - elevation: 6,000 ft (1,800 m)
- Mouth: Graves Creek
  - location: about 0.5 miles west of Graves Bay Campground
  - coordinates: 48°07′45″N 113°49′17″W
  - elevation: 3,694 ft (1,126 m)
- Length: 4.49 mi (7.23 km)
- Basin size: 13.43 square miles (34.8 km^{2})
- Discharge
  - location: Graves Creek
  - average: 48.22 cu ft/s (1.365 m^{3}/s) at mouth with Grave Creek

Basin features
- Progression: Graves Creek → South Fork Flathead River → Flathead River → → Clark Fork → Pend Oreille River → Columbia River → Pacific Ocean
- River system: Flathead River
- Tributaries
  - left: unnamed tributaries
  - right: Jones Creek
- Bridges: none

Aeneas Creek is a stream in the U.S. state of Montana. It is a tributary to Graves Creek.

Aeneas Creek was named after a Flathead chieftain.

== Course ==
Aeneas Creek rises in Aeneas Lake in Flathead County, Montana, and then flows east-southeast to join Graves Creek about 0.5 miles west of Grave Bay Campground.

== Watershed ==
Aeneas Creek drains 13.43 square miles (34.8 km^{2}) of area, receives about 64.3 in/year of precipitation, has a wetness index of 275.86, and is about 77% forested.
