= Queer Creek (Montana) =

Stream in Sanders County, Montana, U.S.

Coordinates: 47°51′56.47″N 115°17′56.26″W

Queer Creek is a stream in Sanders County, Montana, in the United States. It is a tributary to the Vermilion River.

== See also ==
- List of rivers of Montana
