= Big Sandy Creek (Montana) =

River in the United States of America

Location
- Country: Hill and Chouteau County, Montana

Physical characteristics
- Source
  - coordinates: 48°09′32″N 109°41′48″W
- Mouth
  - coordinates: 48°34′05″N 109°48′06″W
  - elevation: 2,484 feet (757 m)

Basin features
- River system: Missouri River

Big Sandy Creek (Gros Ventre: báasnɔ́ɔ́ɔ́béʔ, lit. 'big sand') is a tributary of the Milk River, approximately 50 miles (80 kilometers) long, in northwestern Montana in the United States.

It rises in the southern Rocky Boys Indian Reservation in the Bears Paw Mountains and flows southwest, then north past Box Elder, then northeast, joined by Sage Creek, and joins the Milk approximately 10 mi (16 km) west of Havre.

== Variant names ==
Big Sandy Creek has also been known as: Ahmi-Saptsiko, Sand Creek, and Un-es-putcha-eka.

== See also ==
- List of rivers of Montana
- Montana Stream Access Law
