= Willow Creek (Montana) =

Name of numerous streams in Montana, United States

There are 45 streams named Willow Creek in the U.S. state of Montana.

- Willow Creek (Beaverhead County, Montana), 44°39′02″N 112°39′00″W, el. 6,188 feet (1,886 m)
- Willow Creek (Beaverhead County, Montana), 45°27′28″N 112°39′33″W, el. 4,944 feet (1,507 m)
- Willow Creek (Big Horn County, Montana), 45°00′05″N 108°03′13″W, el. 4,770 feet (1,450 m)
- Willow Creek (Big Horn County, Montana), 45°10′10″N 107°34′56″W, el. 3,996 feet (1,218 m)
- Willow Creek (Big Horn County, Montana), 45°25′28″N 108°34′37″W, el. 4,121 feet (1,256 m)
- Willow Creek (Big Horn County, Montana), 45°38′40″N 107°14′03″W, el. 3,304 feet (1,007 m)
- Willow Creek (Big Horn County, Montana), 45°00′03″N 108°03′13″W, el. 4,741 feet (1,445 m)
- Willow Creek (Blaine County, Montana), 48°12′45″N 109°17′13″W, el. 3,875 feet (1,181 m)
- Willow Creek (Blaine County, Montana), 48°15′41″N 109°09′40″W, el. 3,494 feet (1,065 m)
- Willow Creek (Carbon County, Montana), 45°25′58″N 109°13′37″W, el. 4,255 feet (1,297 m)
- Willow Creek (Carter County, Montana), 45°05′33″N 104°24′42″W, el. 3,373 feet (1,028 m)
- Willow Creek (Cascade County, Montana), 47°14′54″N 111°35′54″W, el. 3,442 feet (1,049 m)
- Willow Creek (Chouteau County, Montana), 47°29′49″N 110°21′36″W, el. 3,852 feet (1,174 m)
- Willow Creek (Deer Lodge County, Montana), 46°06′27″N 112°48′29″W, el. 4,928 feet (1,502 m)
- Willow Creek (Fergus County, Montana), 47°23′53″N 109°39′04″W, el. 2,999 feet (914 m)
- Willow Creek (Flathead County, Montana), 47°48′48″N 113°27′22″W, el. 3,953 feet (1,205 m)
- Willow Creek (Gallatin County, Montana), 45°49′32″N 111°39′53″W, el. 4,144 feet (1,263 m)
- Willow Creek (Glacier County, Montana), 49°09′00″N 113°11′03″W, el. 3,757 feet (1,145 m)
- Willow Creek (Glacier County, Montana), 48°39′25″N 112°44′33″W, el. 3,940 feet (1,200 m)
- Willow Creek (Judith Basin County, Montana), 47°09′10″N 109°59′58″W, el. 3,875 feet (1,181 m)
- Willow Creek (Lewis and Clark County, Montana), 46°34′09″N 112°11′19″W, el. 4,331 feet (1,320 m)
- Willow Creek (Lewis and Clark County, Montana), 47°16′46″N 112°04′04″W, el. 3,953 feet (1,205 m)
- Willow Creek (Lewis and Clark County, Montana), 46°48′14″N 112°12′26″W, el. 4,183 feet (1,275 m)
- Willow Creek (Lewis and Clark County, Montana), 46°53′40″N 111°55′26″W, el. 3,586 feet (1,093 m)
- Willow Creek (Lewis and Clark County, Montana), 46°56′05″N 112°45′40″W, el. 4,436 feet (1,352 m)
- Willow Creek (Lewis and Clark County, Montana), 47°00′33″N 112°27′36″W, el. 4,954 feet (1,510 m)
- Willow Creek (Lewis and Clark County, Montana), 47°33′10″N 112°23′53″W, el. 3,989 feet (1,216 m)
- Willow Creek (Liberty County, Montana), 48°21′01″N 111°11′11″W, el. 2,986 feet (910 m)
- Willow Creek (Madison County, Montana), 45°04′35″N 112°03′00″W, el. 5,787 feet (1,764 m)
- Willow Creek (Madison County, Montana), 45°42′17″N 112°31′36″W, el. 6,434 feet (1,961 m)
- Willow Creek (Meagher County, Montana), 46°27′06″N 110°23′46″W, el. 4,931 feet (1,503 m)
- Willow Creek (Meagher County, Montana), 46°33′46″N 110°52′29″W, el. 5,069 feet (1,545 m)
- Willow Creek (Musselshell County, Montana), 46°27′58″N 108°26′02″W, el. 3,136 feet (956 m)
- Willow Creek (Park County, Montana), 45°48′04″N 110°31′03″W, el. 4,577 feet (1,395 m)
- Willow Creek (Powder River County, Montana), 45°31′37″N 106°11′21″W, el. 3,008 feet (917 m)
- Willow Creek (Powder River County, Montana), 45°35′05″N 106°08′02″W, el. 3,143 feet (958 m)
- Willow Creek (Powell County, Montana), 46°31′59″N 112°49′30″W, el. 4,304 feet (1,312 m)
- Willow Creek (Ravalli County, Montana), 46°20′37″N 114°07′58″W, el. 3,428 feet (1,045 m)
- Willow Creek (Sanders County, Montana), 47°52′14″N 115°18′51″W, el. 3,566 feet (1,087 m)
- Willow Creek (Sheridan County, Montana), 48°31′48″N 104°02′59″W, el. 2,024 feet (617 m)
- Willow Creek (Teton County, Montana), 47°44′27″N 112°16′39″W, el. 3,947 feet (1,203 m)
- Willow Creek (Treasure County, Montana), 46°25′00″N 107°28′41″W, el. 2,864 feet (873 m)
- Willow Creek (Valley County, Montana), 48°09′26″N 106°35′43″W, el. 2,057 feet (627 m)
- Willow Creek (Valley County, Montana), 48°33′30″N 106°59′45″W, el. 2,188 feet (667 m)
- Willow Creek (Wheatland County, Montana), 46°16′09″N 110°11′33″W, el. 5,663 feet (1,726 m)

== See also ==
- List of rivers of Montana
- Montana Stream Access Law
