= International Larix Arboretum =

Arboretum in Hungry Horse, Montana, United States

Coordinates: 48.3838°N 114.0575°W

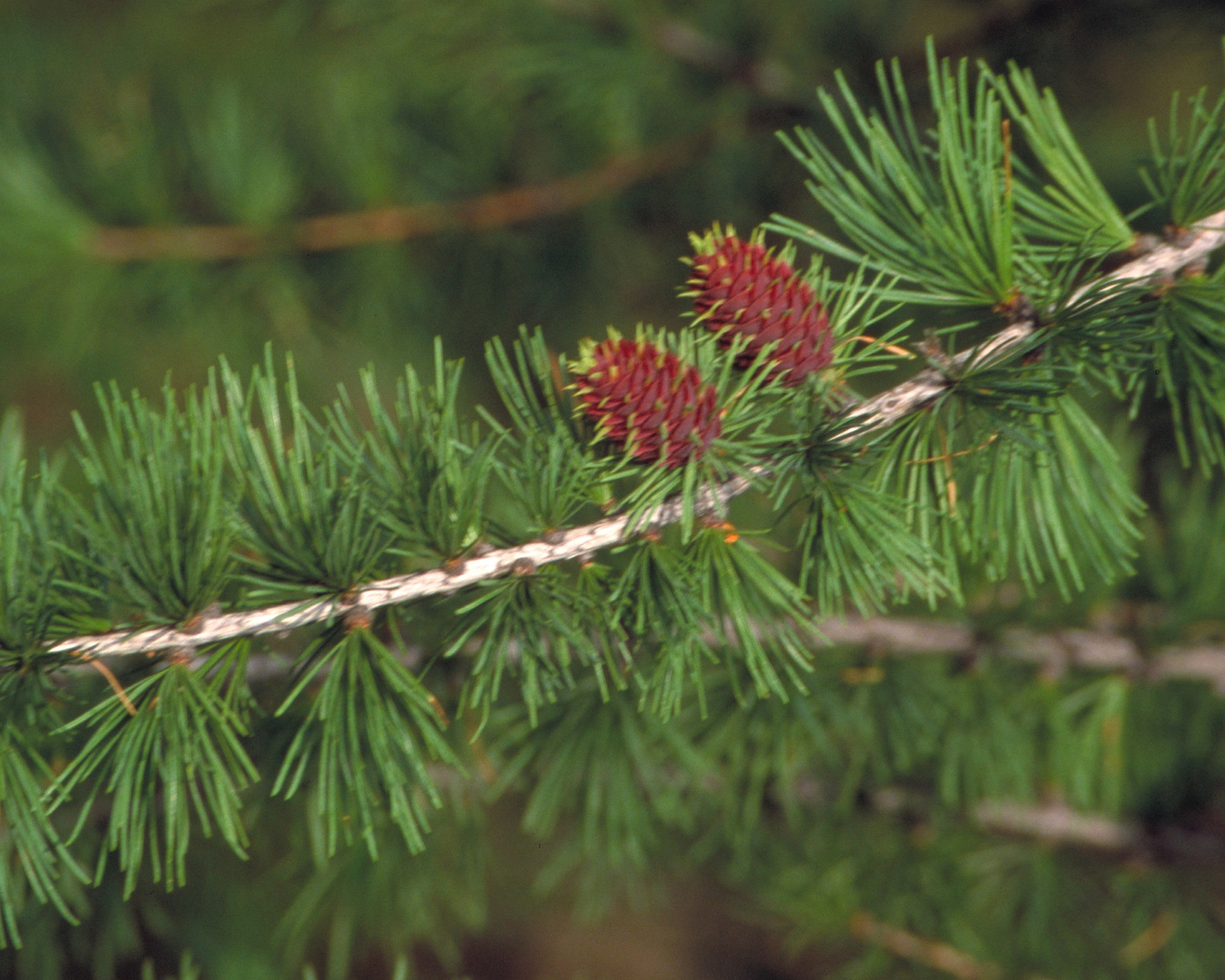
- Young cones of Larix occidentalis
- Interactive map of International Larix Arboretum

The International Larix Arboretum is a small arboretum of 1.2 acres (4,900 m^{2}) dedicated to the scientific study of the larch (Larix) species. It is located within the Coram Experimental Forest, 30 yards SE of the Hungry Horse Ranger station at 10 Hungry Horse Drive Hungry Horse, Montana. The Arboretum is open to the public, without charge, during daylight hours from April to October.

Coram Experimental Forest was established in 1933 on the Flathead National Forest as an area representative of the Western Larch (Larix occidentalis). While quite similar in appearance to other members of the pine tree family (pinaceae), the larch is not an evergreen. It is deciduous and its needle-like leaves turn yellow and are shed in the autumn. In addition, its wood is water resistant and thus used for fence posts, boat building, and exterior cladding.

The Arboretum was dedicated on October 7, 1992, as part of an International Larix Symposium to provide opportunities for species comparisons and genetics research. Species from North America, Asia, and Europe were planted, along with subspecies and hybrids. The Arboretum is organized as three equal-sized blocks, each about 70 by 230 feet (21 by 70 m), with 12 trees of each species, subspecies, and hybrids in each of the three blocks, for a total of nearly 600 trees.

The species planted are European Larch (Larix decidua), Dahurian Larch (Larix gmelinii), Japanese Larch (Larix kaempferi), Tamarack Larch (Larix laricina), Subalpine Larch (Larix lyallii), Masters' Larch (Larix mastersiana), Western Larch (Larix occidentalis), Chinese Larch (Larix potaninii), and Siberian Larch (Larix sibirica). Himalayan Larch (Larix griffithii) was also to be planted but seed could not be obtained.

Hybrids planted include L. decidua x L. kaempferi (Larix x marschlinsii; Dunkeld Larch), L. lyallii x L. occidentalis (Bitterroot Larch), and L. occidentalis x L. lyallii (Bitterroot Larch, reverse cross).

== See also ==
- List of botanical gardens in the United States
