= Eureka Reservoir =

Reservoir in Montana, United States

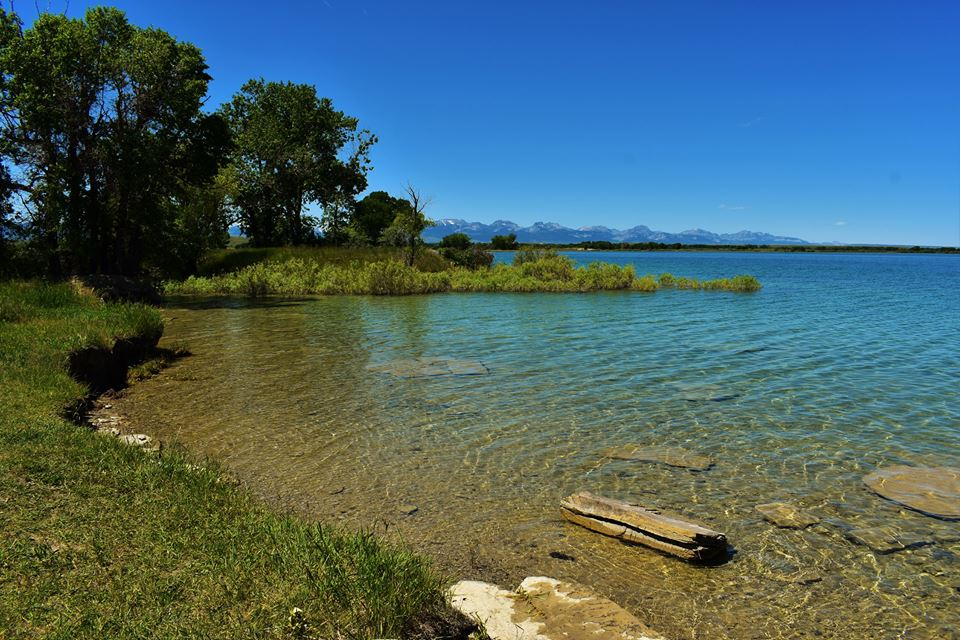
- The Eureka Reservoir shoreline
- Interactive map of Eureka Reservoir
- Location: Near Choteau, Montana
- Coordinates: 47.88132°N 112.31447°W
- Type: Reservoir
- Primary inflows: Unnamed Canal
- Primary outflows: Unnamed Canal
- Managing agency: Teton Cooperative Canal Company
- Built: 1936
- Surface area: 366 acres (148 ha)
- Surface elevation: 4,149.2 feet (1,264.7 m)
- Settlements: Choteau, Montana
- References: https://myfwp.mt.gov/fishMT/waterbody/searchByID?waterBodyID=42514 https://data.statesmanjournal.com/dam/montana/teton-county/eureka-reservoir-dam/mt01354/

Eureka Reservoir is a reservoir in Teton County in the U.S State of Montana. The reservoir is mainly used for irrigation and recreation.

== History ==
Eureka Reservoir was designed by the Montana State Water Conservation Board, and was completed in 1936 by the Teton Cooperative Canal Company. The company manages its water levels and irrigation water, and the Montana Department of Natural Resources and Conservation regulates the reservoir. Additionally, the Montana Department of Fish, Wildlife, and Parks stocks the lake with fish.

== Species ==
Six species have been identified in the lake by Montana Department of Fish, Wildlife and Parks: brook trout, brown trout, longnose sucker, northern redbelly/finescale dace, rainbow trout and white sucker. The lake may be stocked annually with rainbow trout depending on water levels.

== Location ==
Eureka Reservoir is located seven miles away from Choteau on Blackleaf Road.

== See also ==
- Choteau, Montana
- Bynum Reservoir
