= Coram, Montana =

Unincorporated community in Montana, United States

- Census-designated place
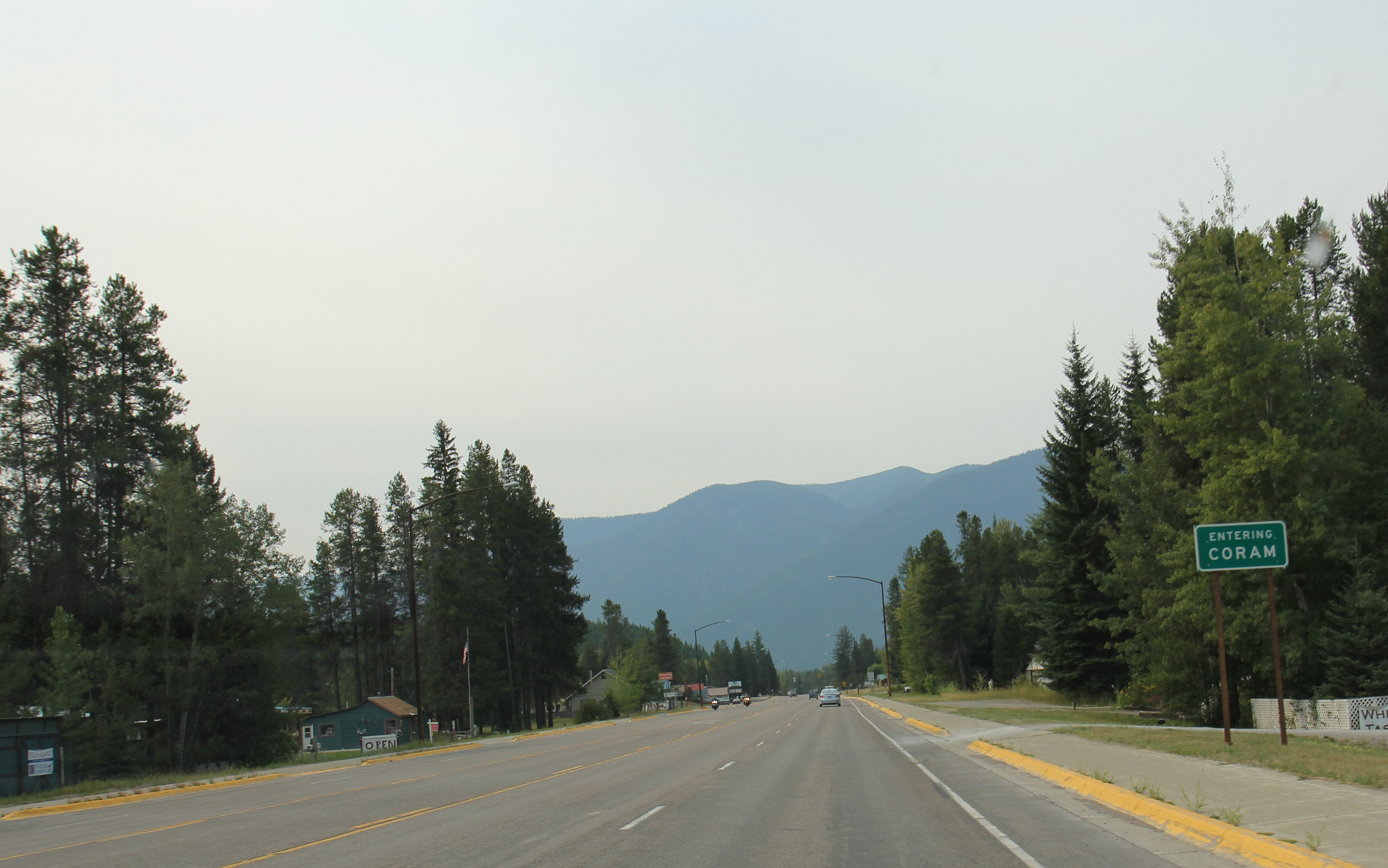
- Looking westerly at the sign for Coram on U.S. Route 2

- Location of Coram, Montana
- Coordinates: 48°25′50″N 114°02′40″W
- Country: United States
- State: Montana
- County: Flathead

Area
  - Total: 3.85 sq mi (9.98 km^{2})
  - Land: 3.71 sq mi (9.61 km^{2})
  - Water: 0.15 sq mi (0.38 km^{2})
- Elevation: 3,209 ft (978 m)

Population (2020)
  - Total: 572
  - Density: 154.2/sq mi (59.53/km^{2})
- Time zone: UTC-7 (Mountain (MST))
  - Summer (DST): UTC-6 (MDT)
- ZIP code: 59913
- Area code: 406
- FIPS code: 30-17500
- GNIS feature ID: 2407660

Coram is an unincorporated community and census-designated place (CDP) in Flathead County, Montana, United States. As of the 2020 census, Coram had a population of 572. Coram lies 7 miles (11 km) southwest of the western entrance of Glacier National Park.

The community was named after William Coram, a lumberman. It began as a logging town on the South Fork of the Flathead River in 1905. Coram boomed between 1948 and 1953, during construction of the nearby Hungry Horse Dam.

== Geography ==
Coram is located in central Flathead County on the east side of the Flathead River. U.S. Route 2 passes through the community, leading northeast 6.5 miles (10.5 km) to the community of West Glacier and southwest 27 miles (43 km) to Kalispell.

According to the United States Census Bureau, the Coram CDP has a total area of 3.8 square miles (9.9 km^{2}), of which 3.7 square miles (9.6 km^{2}) is land and 0.1 square miles (0.3 km^{2}), or 2.72%, is water.

== Demographics ==
Historical population
Census	Pop.	Note	%±
2000	337		—
2010	539		59.9%
2020	572		6.1%
U.S. Decennial Census

As of the census of 2000, there were 337 people, 134 households, and 88 families residing in the CDP. The population density was 296.5 inhabitants per square mile (114.5/km^{2}). There were 151 housing units at an average density of 132.9 per square mile (51.3/km^{2}). The racial makeup of the CDP was 93.47% White, 2.67% Native American, 0.89% Asian, 1.19% from other races, and 1.78% from two or more races. Hispanic or Latino of any race were 2.08% of the population.

There were 134 households, out of which 33.6% had children under the age of 18 living with them, 51.5% were married couples living together, 6.7% had a female householder with no husband present, and 34.3% were non-families. 27.6% of all households were made up of individuals, and 7.5% had someone living alone who was 65 years of age or older. The average household size was 2.51 and the average family size was 3.09.

In the CDP, the population was spread out, with 27.0% under the age of 18, 6.8% from 18 to 24, 29.7% from 25 to 44, 27.6% from 45 to 64, and 8.9% who were 65 years of age or older. The median age was 39 years. For every 100 females, there were 113.3 males. For every 100 females age 18 and over, there were 115.8 males.

The median income for a household in the CDP was $22,000, and the median income for a family was $23,125. Males had a median income of $24,188 versus $14,286 for females. The per capita income for the CDP was $18,799. About 12.9% of families and 19.0% of the population were below the poverty line, including 13.0% of those under age 18 and none of those age 65 or over.
