= Thompson River (Montana) =

- Location of the mouth of the Thompson River in Montana

Location
- Country: United States
- State: Montana
- County: Sanders County

Physical characteristics
- Source
  - location: Rocky Mountains, Montana
  - coordinates: 48°0′52″N 115°11′27″W
  - elevation: 3,337 ft (1,017 m)
- Mouth: Clark Fork
  - location: Thompson Falls, Montana
  - coordinates: 47°34′37″N 115°14′23″W
  - elevation: 2,405 ft (733 m)
- Discharge
  - location: Thompson Falls, Montana
  - average: 439 cuft/s
  - minimum: 80 cuft/s
  - maximum: 1,785 cuft/s

Basin features
- Tributaries
  - left: Little Thompson River

The Thompson River is a tributary of the Clark Fork in the U.S. state of Montana. It is part of the Columbia River basin, as Clark Fork is a tributary of the Pend Oreille River, which is a tributary of the Columbia River.

The Thompson River is named in honor of David Thompson.

== Course ==
The Thompson River originates in Upper Thompson Lake and flows generally south to join Clark Fork near the town of Thompson Falls.

== See also ==
- List of rivers of Montana
- Tributaries of the Columbia River
