= Tepee Creek (Fall River County, South Dakota) =

Stream in South Dakota, U.S.

Coordinates: 43°17′06″N 103°27′30″W

Tepee Creek is a stream in the U.S. state of South Dakota.

Tepee Creek was named for the fact ranchers discovered abandoned tepee parts near the creek.

== See also ==
- List of rivers of South Dakota
