= Tepee Creek (Meade and Miner counties, South Dakota) =

Stream in South Dakota, U.S.

Coordinates: 44°27′20″N 102°13′47″W

Tepee Creek is a stream in the U.S. state of South Dakota.

Tepee Creek's name comes from the Sioux Indians of the area, for the fact they lived in tepees.

== See also ==
- List of rivers of South Dakota
