= ZooMontana =

Zoo and botanical park in Billings, Montana, United States

- Interactive map of ZooMontana
- 45.7315°N 108.6226°W
- Date opened: 1992
- Location: Billings, Montana, United States
- Land area: 70 acres (28 ha)
- No. of animals: 100
- No. of species: 58
- Annual visitors: 160,000
- Major exhibits: Asia Region, Botanical Gardens, Discovery Center, Living Wall, North America Region, Yellowstone Arboretum
- Director: Jessica Hart
- Public transit: MET Transit
- Website: www.zoomontana.org

ZooMontana is a 70-acre (28 ha) zoo located in Billings, Montana, U.S. and is Montana's only zoo and botanical park. The zoo currently maintains nearly 100 animals, representing 58 species. These animals all live in habitats designed to imitate their natural habitats. The zoo was incorporated and established as a nonprofit 501(c)(3) organization in 1992. It focuses on year-round wildlife native to Montana, the Rocky Mountains, and other cold temperature regions at or above the 45th parallel. Indoor habitats include animals from around the world. The zoo hosts over 160,000 visitors per year.

Canyon Creek runs through the center of the zoo's grounds, creating a natural and tranquil park-like setting. 2018 marked the establishment of the Yellowstone Arboretum located on the ZooMontana grounds, containing a large selection of native and non-native trees.

== Animal exhibits ==
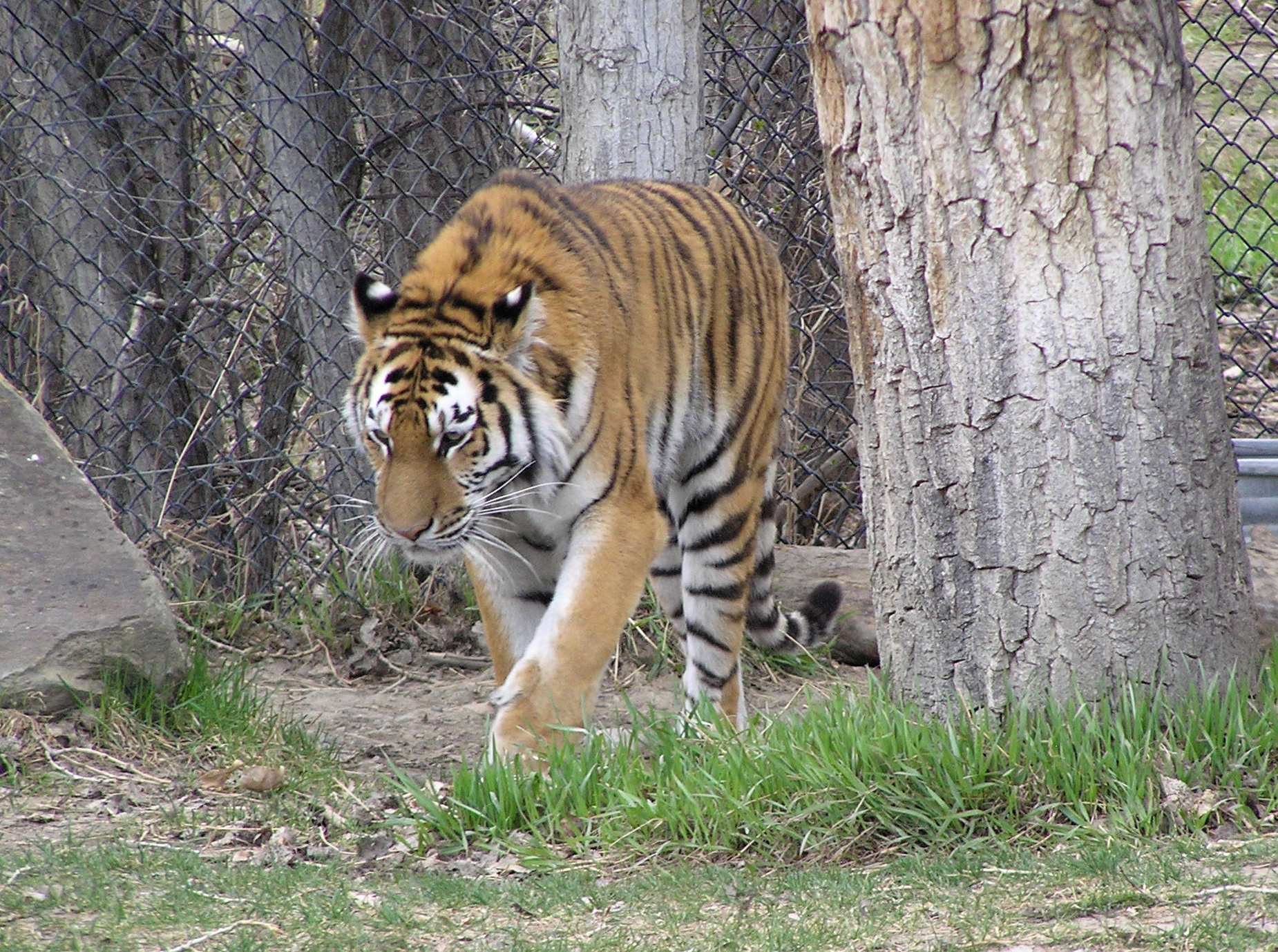
Siberian tiger

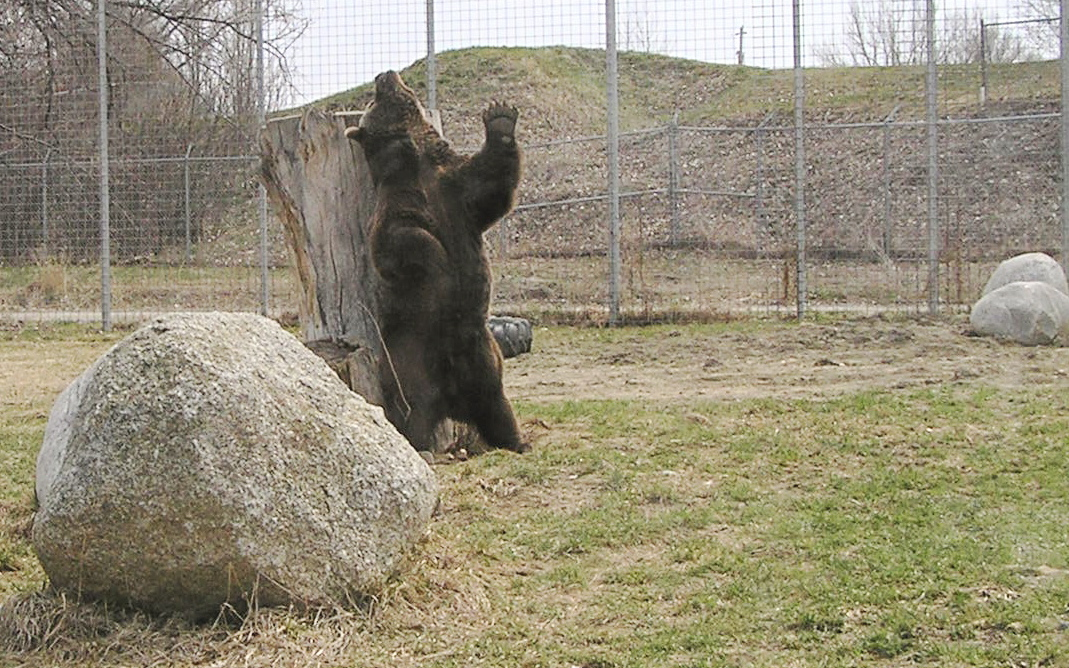
Grizzly bear

ZooMontana is divided into two main "regions" in addition to other exhibits. The Asia Region starts by the wolves and is a paved path through a cottonwood forest. The path splits at one point and one half becomes a nature trail. The other path splits again, one going towards the Siberian tiger, and the other going to the red panda.

The North America Region includes habitats for wolf, grizzly bear, river otter, beaver, bald eagle, and bighorn sheep.

Several animals can be found indoors amongst the Living Wall habitats within the zoo's Discovery Center. These exhibits include animals from South America, Africa, and other parts of the world. These Living Wall Habitats include iguana, mink, chinchilla, western screech-owl, Madagascar hissing cockroaches, tiger salamander, ball python, box turtle, rubber boa, aracari, common degus, Columbian red tailed boa constrictor, savannah monitor, and several other snakes, lizards, turtles, amphibians, and arthropods.

The Barn is home to mostly domesticated animals, including Belgian draft horses, pygmy goats, peafowl, rabbits, and goats. During the warmer months, the turkey vulture may be found here as well.

Zoo guests also may visit the ponds and feed the koi for a small fee.

Beginning in 2016, the zoo opened new exhibits featuring takin, wolverines, American bison, and raptors.

== Botanical gardens ==
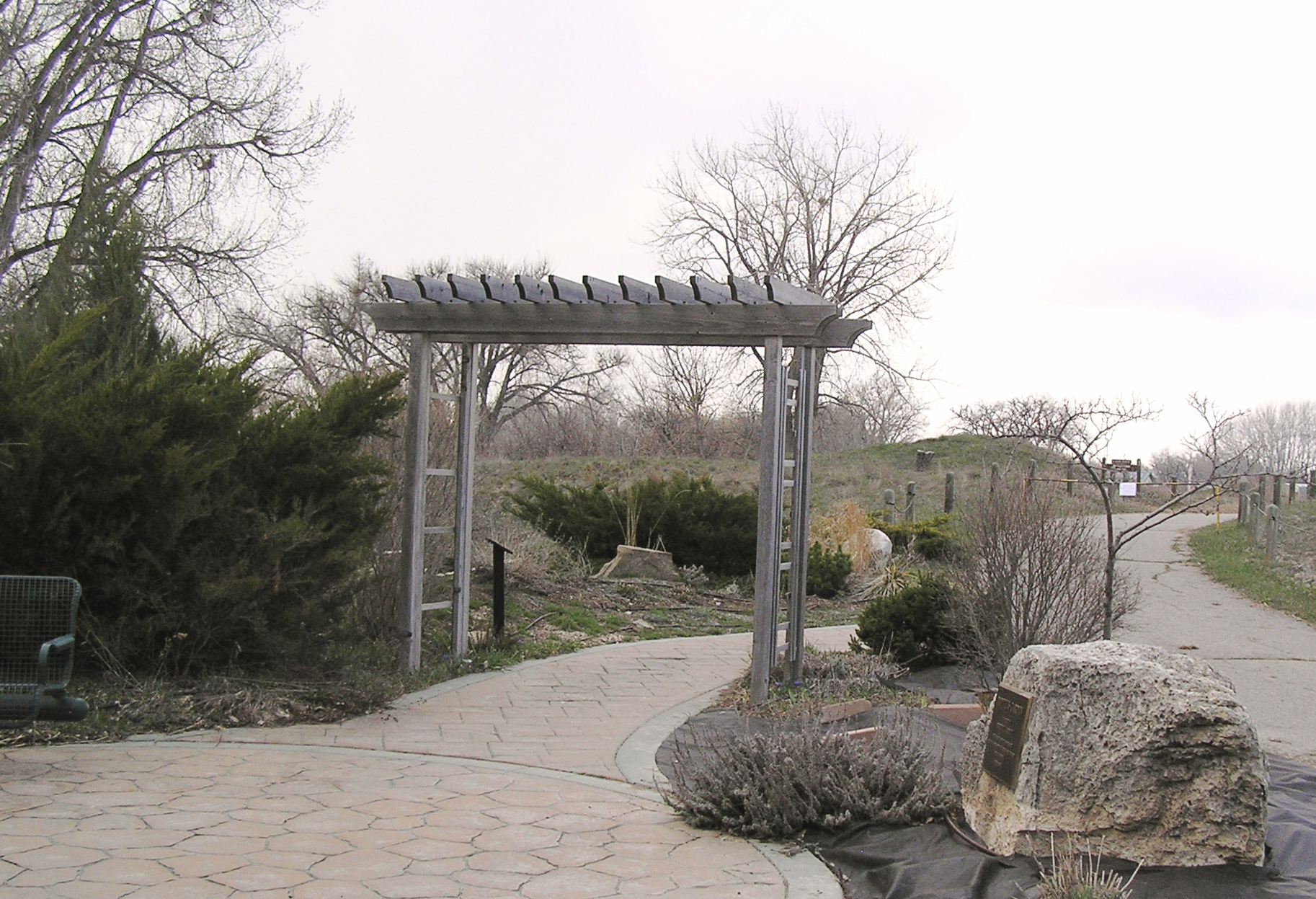
Early spring at ZooMontana

The 1-acre (0.40 ha) Sensory Garden is planted with both native and exotic plants intended to stimulate the senses, and it is a popular site for weddings. The zoo also includes a Montana garden with native plants, and Dottie's Garden, which is home to plants that use very little water.

== ZooSchool Preschool ==
ZooMontana is home to ZooSchool Preschool, an independent preschool which holds classes within the zoo.

== Science and Conservation Center ==
The Science and Conservation Center is an independent non-profit organization that is headquartered at the zoo. The center produces and distributes a wildlife contraceptive vaccine, and maintains records and data required by the Food and Drug Administration and Environmental Protection Agency. Working with the Contraception Advisory Group of the AZA at the Saint Louis Zoo, the center coordinates, and in some cases carries out, application of the contraceptive to wildlife.

== History ==
In March 2014, ZooMontana experienced flooding, and more than 3 feet (0.91 m) of water covered some of the zoo’s paths.
