= Bynum Reservoir =

Reservoir in Montana, United States

- Location in Montana
- Interactive map of Bynum Reservoir
- Location: near Bynum, Montana
- Coordinates: 47.946°N 112.434°W
- Type: Reservoir
- Etymology: Stephen and Frances Bynum
- Managing agency: Teton Reservoir Cooperative Company
- Built: 1908
- Surface area: 3,205.4 acres (1,297.2 ha)
- Surface elevation: 4,167 feet (1,270 m)

Bynum Reservoir is a reservoir in Teton County in the U.S. state of Montana, near the census-designated place of Bynum. The Teton Reservoir Cooperative Company manages the reservoir for irrigational purposes, and it is stocked with fish by the Montana Department of Fish, Wildlife and Parks. The reservoir is part of the Bynum Irrigation District.

== History ==
Bynum Reservoir was developed in 1907 by the Teton Reservoir Cooperative Company to reclaim 15,000 acres of desert land under the Carey Land Act. The reservoir was named after Stephen and Frances Bynum, who operated a store and post office in the area. The company began work in 1908 on the reservoir, and later added the main diversion canal in 1910. Then, in 1925, farmers of the area formed the Bynum Irrigation District, which currently irrigates more than 20,000 acres of farmland.

== Species ==
Bynum Reservoir contains ten species of fish, although all species are assumed dead due to the dead storage status of the reservoir. The ten species are brook stickleback, brook trout, brown trout, kokanee salmon, mottled sculpin, mountain whitefish, rainbow trout, spottail shiner, white sucker and yellow perch.

== Location ==
Bynum Reservoir is located seven miles west of Bynum on Blackleaf Road.
