= Hungry Horse, Montana =

Unincorporated community in Montana, United States

- Census-designated place
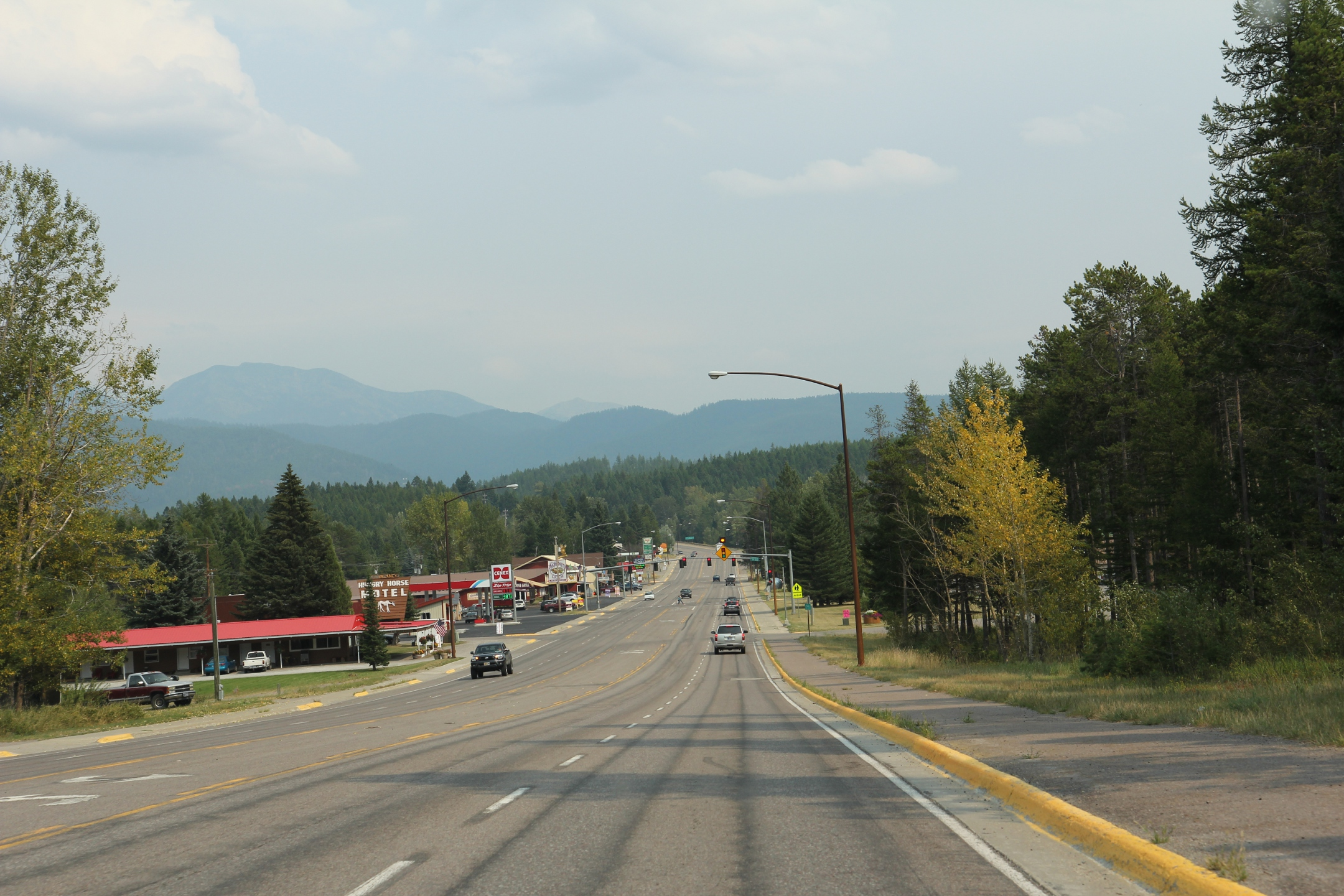
- Looking east at Hungry Horse Montana on U.S. Route 2

- Location of Hungry Horse, Montana
- Coordinates: 48°22′50″N 114°03′35″W
- Country: United States
- State: Montana
- County: Flathead

Area
  - Total: 1.52 sq mi (3.94 km^{2})
  - Land: 1.43 sq mi (3.71 km^{2})
  - Water: 0.089 sq mi (0.23 km^{2})
- Elevation: 3,097 ft (944 m)

Population (2020)
  - Total: 891
  - Density: 577.5/sq mi (222.99/km^{2})
- Time zone: UTC-7 (Mountain (MST))
  - Summer (DST): UTC-6 (MDT)
- ZIP code: 59919
- Area code: 406
- FIPS code: 30-38125
- GNIS feature ID: 2408409

Hungry Horse is an unincorporated community and census-designated place (CDP) in Flathead County, Montana, United States. The population was 828 at the 2020 census. The ZIP code for Hungry Horse is 59919.

== History ==
The community sprang up during the construction of Hungry Horse Dam when the U.S. Bureau of Reclamation placed more than one hundred prefabricated buildings at the site to house workers. In 1948, Flathead County commissioners changed the name of the newly formed "Damtown" to Hungry Horse. The name comes from a local legend about two horses, Tex and Jerry, that escaped and almost starved to death in deep snow along the South Fork of the Flathead River.

== Geography ==
Hungry Horse is located in central Flathead County at the confluence of the Flathead River and its South Fork. Bad Rock Canyon lies less than one mile to the west of Hungry Horse.

U.S. Route 2 passes through Hungry Horse, leading northeast 10 miles (16 km) to West Glacier and southwest 23 miles (37 km) to Kalispell. West Side Road leads southeast from town up the South Fork valley 4 miles (6 km) to Hungry Horse Dam and its reservoir.

According to the United States Census Bureau, the Hungry Horse CDP has a total area of 1.5 square miles (3.8 km^{2}), of which 1.4 square miles (3.7 km^{2}) is land and 0.04 square miles (0.1 km^{2}), or 3.61%, is water.

== Demographics ==
Historical population
Census	Pop.	Note	%±
2020	828		—
U.S. Decennial Census

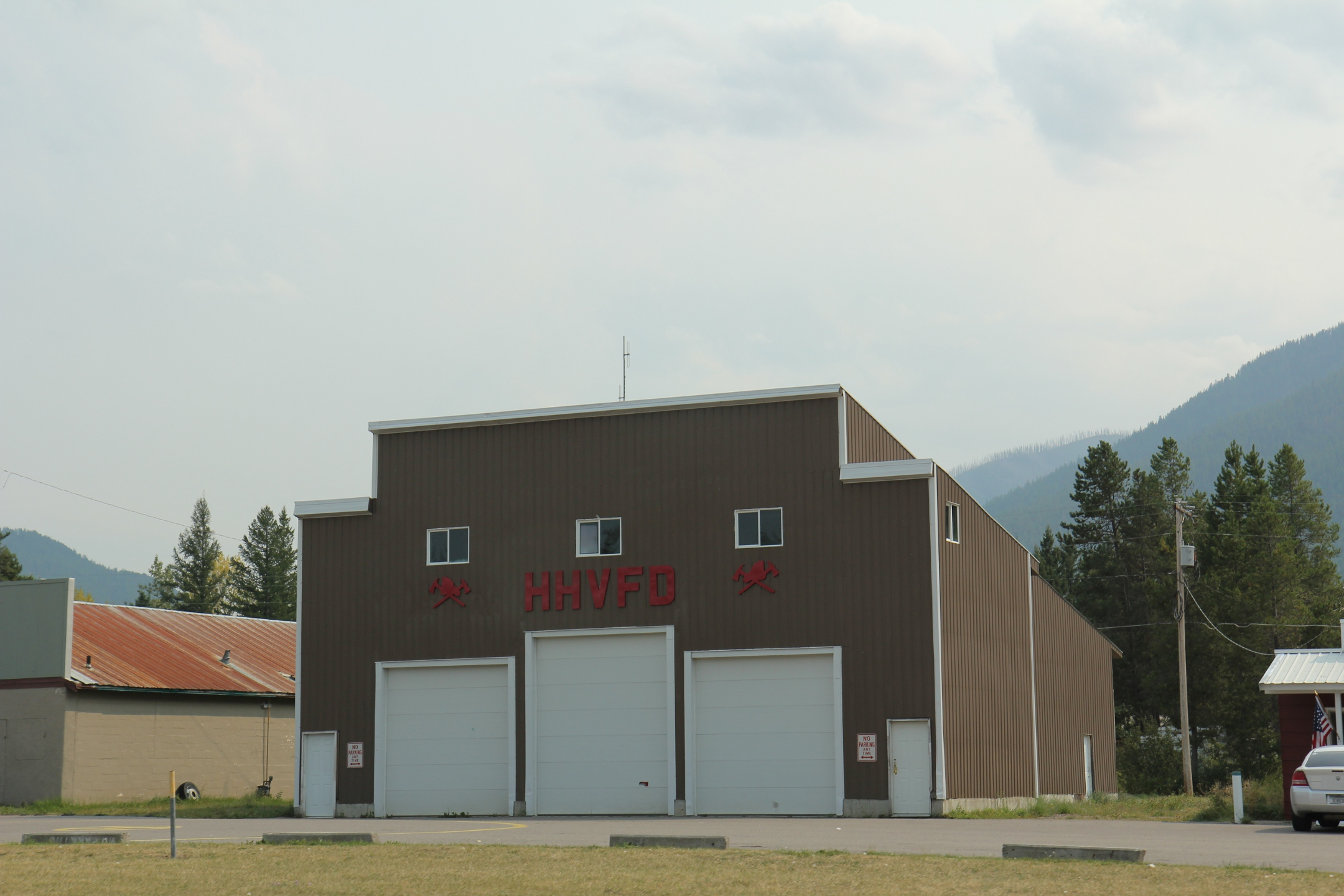
Hungry Horse Volunteer Fire Department

As of the census of 2000, there were 934 people, 346 households, and 237 families residing in the CDP. The population density was 506.0 inhabitants per square mile (195.4/km^{2}). There were 404 housing units at an average density of 218.9 per square mile (84.5/km^{2}). The racial makeup of the CDP was 94.86% White, 2.14% Native American, 0.11% Asian, 0.43% Pacific Islander, 0.43% from other races, and 2.03% from two or more races. Hispanic or Latino of any race were 1.71% of the population.

There were 346 households, out of which 37.0% had children under the age of 18 living with them, 50.6% were married couples living together, 11.0% had a female householder with no husband present, and 31.5% were non-families. 24.3% of all households were made up of individuals, and 4.9% had someone living alone who was 65 years of age or older. The average household size was 2.70 and the average family size was 3.20.

In the CDP, the population was spread out, with 30.3% under the age of 18, 7.9% from 18 to 24, 31.3% from 25 to 44, 23.7% from 45 to 64, and 6.9% who were 65 years of age or older. The median age was 35 years. For every 100 females, there were 108.5 males. For every 100 females age 18 and over, there were 115.6 males.

The median income for a household in the CDP was $26,550, and the median income for a family was $28,523. Males had a median income of $30,197 versus $16,607 for females. The per capita income for the CDP was $10,530. About 18.1% of families and 29.7% of the population were below the poverty line, including 38.3% of those under age 18 and 19.8% of those age 65 or over.

In 2010, the census reported 826 people.

== Points of interest ==
- Hungry Horse Dam
- Bad Rock Canyon
- International Larix Arboretum

== Notable people ==
- Dee Brown, American politician
