= Little Thompson River (Montana) =

- Location of the mouth of the Little Thompson River in Montana

Location
- Country: United States
- State: Montana
- County: Sanders County

Physical characteristics
- Source
  - location: Lolo National Forest, Montana
  - coordinates: 47°45′27″N 114°45′14″W
- Mouth: Thompson River
  - coordinates: 47°43′46″N 115°01′46″W

Basin features
- Tributaries
  - left: Nancy Creek; McGinnis Creek; Corona Creek; Mudd Creek
  - right: Alder Creek; Tepee Creek; Cabin Creek; Snider Creek; North Fork Little Thompson River; Little Rock Creek; Marten Creek

Little Thompson River is a stream in Sanders County, Montana. It is a left tributary of the larger Thompson River of Montana, itself a tributary of the Clark Fork River. It has its headwaters in Lolo National Forest, where it is fed by a number of smaller creeks and streams.

== List Of Crossings ==
- Plum Cr Timbr County Rd (location 47°43'45.8"N 115°01'42.9"W)
- Thompson River Pass Rd (location 47°41'09.9"N 114°59'55.1"W)
- Unnamed Road (location 47°41'01.4"N 114°49'36.0"W)
- Unnamed Road Ford (crossing) (location 47°42'32.4"N 114°46'36.9"W)
- Unnamed Road (location 47°44'00.8"N 114°45'30.8"W)

== See also ==
- List of rivers of Montana
- Tributaries of the Columbia River
