= South Fork Flathead River =

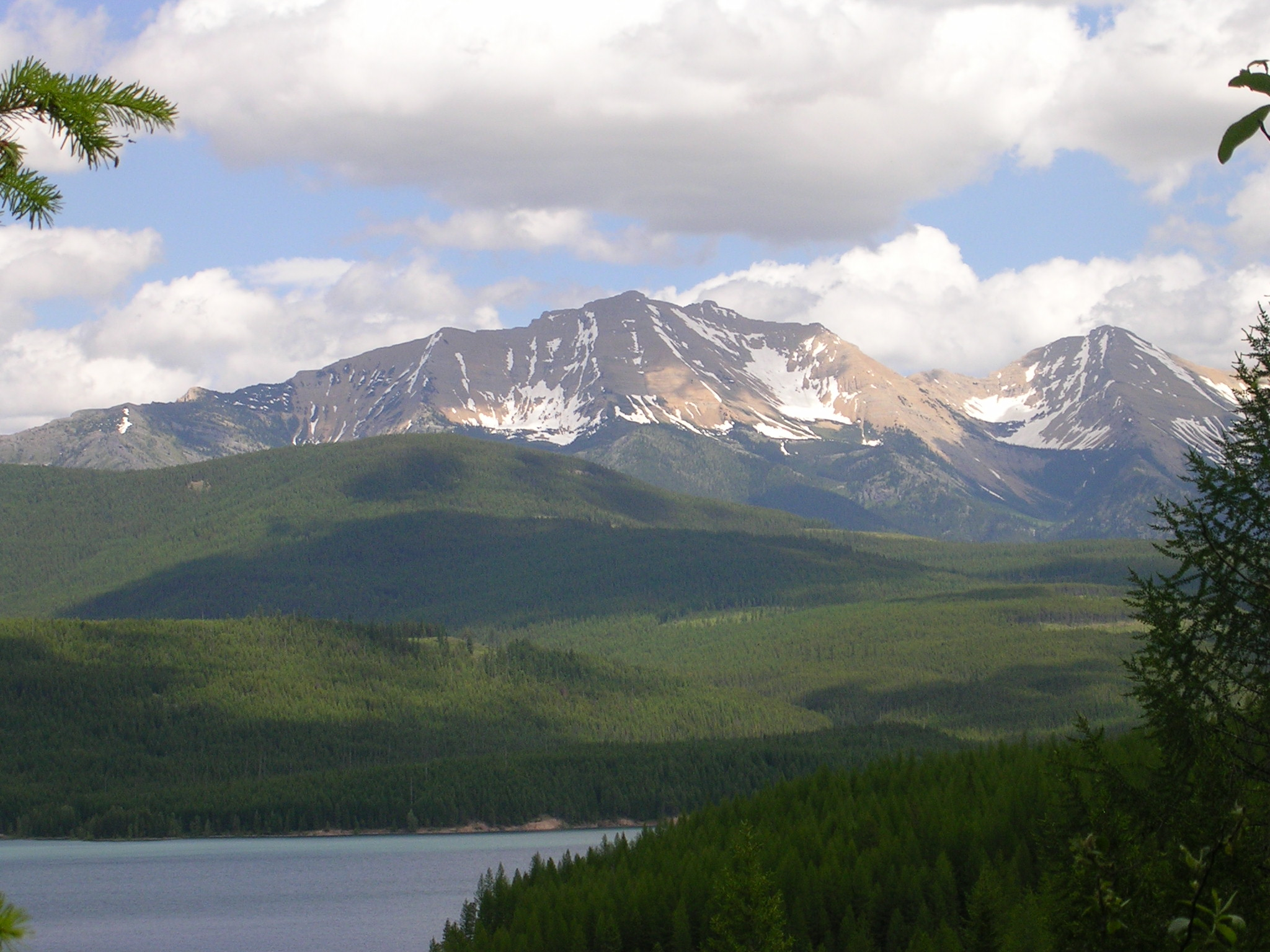

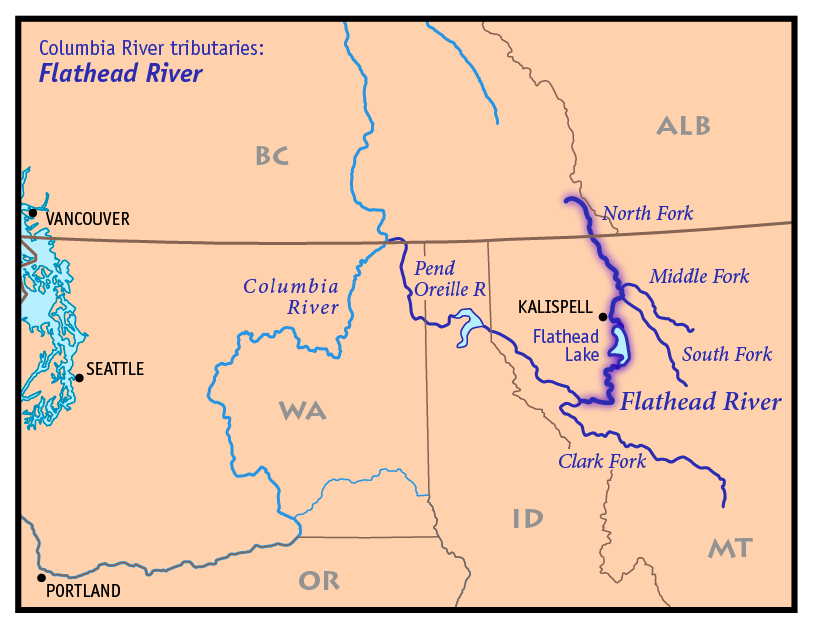
- Map of the Flathead River drainage basin showing the South Fork

Location
- Country: United States
- State: Montana
- County: Flathead

Physical characteristics
- Source
  - coordinates: 47°26′44″N 113°11′01″W
- Mouth
  - coordinates: 48°23′22″N 114°05′18″W
  - elevation: 3,031 feet (924 m)
- Length: 98 miles (158 km)
- Basin size: 1,663 mi^{2} (4,310 km^{2})
- Discharge
  - average: 3,483 cu ft/s (98.6 m^{3}/s)

Basin features
- River system: Columbia River

National Wild and Scenic River
- Designated: October 12, 1976

The South Fork Flathead River is a major river in Northwestern Montana in the northwest United States. It is one of the three main forks of the Flathead River, a tributary of the Clark Fork River (the Pend Oreille River). The north-northwest trending river is about 98 miles (158 km) long, making it the second longest tributary of the Flathead River.

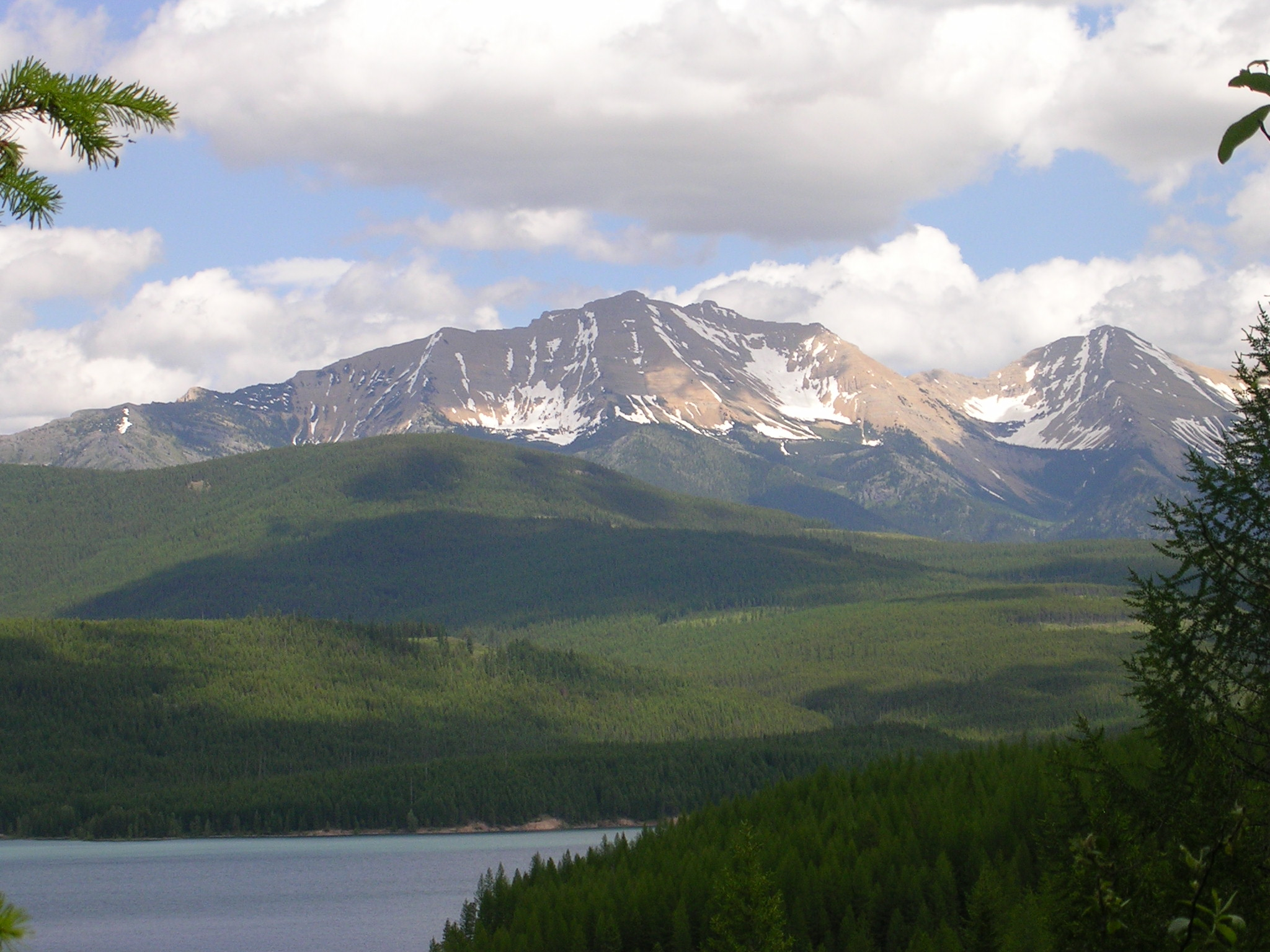
Hungry Horse Reservoir with Great Northern Mountain beyond

The river begins in the Bob Marshall Wilderness south of Glacier National Park, as does the Middle Fork Flathead River, at the confluence of two streams, Danaher Creek and Youngs Creek, between the Flathead Range and the Swan Range. For some 40 miles (64 km), the river flows freely north-northwest, meandering through a forested and undeveloped valley. The river enters a narrow gorge, running north, then begins to enter the backwater of Hungry Horse Reservoir after receiving Meadow Creek from the left. Hungry Horse Reservoir occupies much of the lower half of the river, covering 97 square miles (250 km^{2}). The reservoir trends north then northwest, and the river then passes through the arched Hungry Horse Dam, just a few miles above the mouth. After it leaves the dam, the river enters a narrow gorge and, exiting the canyon for the final time, runs northwest past the town of Hungry Horse, then joins the Flathead River, just a few miles below its headwaters at the North Fork and Middle Forks' convergence.
