= Hungry Horse Dam =

Dam in Montana

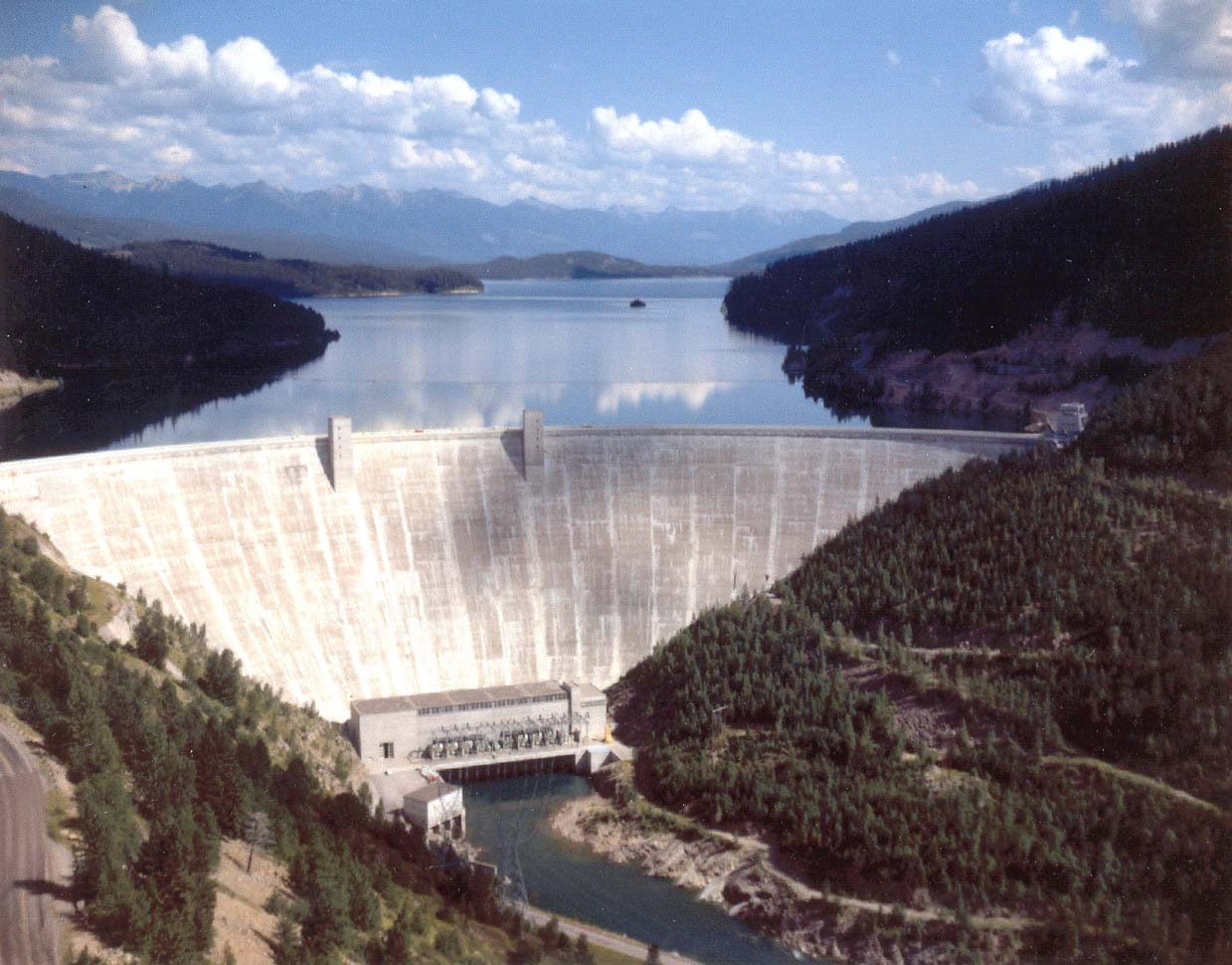

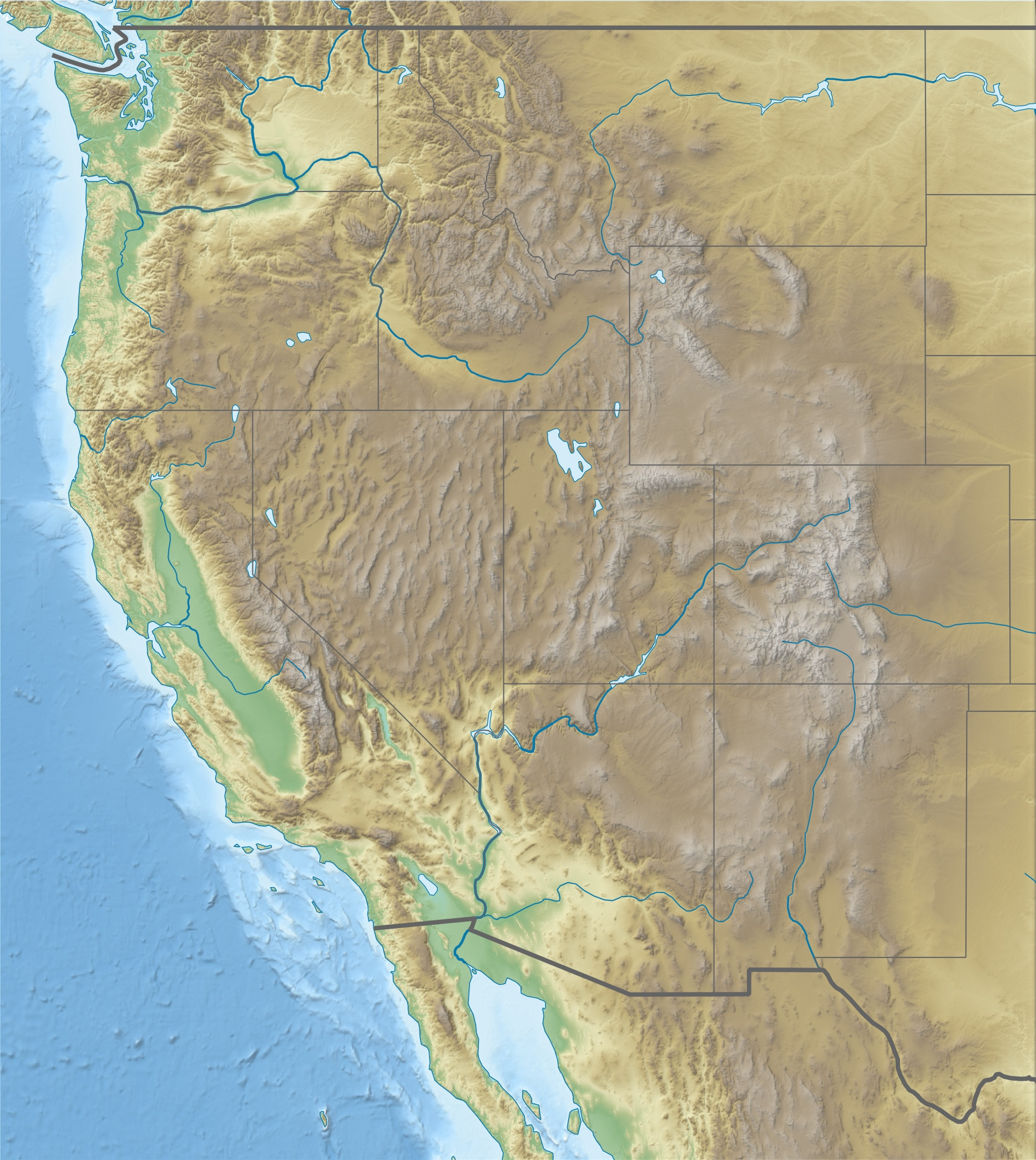
- Location in western United States Location in Montana
- Location: Flathead County, near Hungry Horse, Montana, U.S.
- Coordinates: 48.341°N 114.014°W
- Construction began: April 21, 1948 (78 years ago)
- Opening date: July 18, 1953 (72 years ago)
- Operator: U.S. Bureau of Reclamation

Dam and spillways
- Type of dam: Concrete thick arch dam
- Impounds: South Fork Flathead River
- Height: 564 ft (172 m)
- Length: 2,115 ft (645 m)
- Width (crest): 34 feet (10.4 m)
- Width (base): 320 feet (98 m)
- Dam volume: 2,934,500 cu yd (2,243,600 m^{3})
- Spillway type: Gated Morning Glory
- Spillway capacity: 50,000 cu ft/s (1,400 m^{3}/s)

Reservoir
- Creates: Hungry Horse; Reservoir
- Total capacity: 3,467,179 acre-feet (4.28 km^{3})
- Catchment area: 1,640 square miles (4,200 km^{2})
- Normal elevation: 3,560 feet (1,085 m) above sea level

Power Station
- Type: Conventional
- Hydraulic head: 520 ft (160 m)
- Turbines: 4 x 107 MW Francis turbines
- Installed capacity: 428 MW
- Annual generation: 1,086,250,400 kWh (2012)

Hungry Horse Dam is an arch dam in the Western United States, on the South Fork Flathead River in the Rocky Mountains of northwest Montana. It is located in Flathead National Forest in Flathead County, about fifteen miles (24 km) south of the west entrance to Glacier National Park, nine miles (14 km) southeast of Columbia Falls, and twenty miles (32 km) northeast of Kalispell. The Hungry Horse project, dam, and powerplant are operated by the U.S. Bureau of Reclamation. The entrance road leading to the dam is located in Hungry Horse.

The purposes of the Hungry Horse Project authorized by law are irrigation, flood control, navigation, streamflow regulation, hydroelectric generation, and other beneficial uses such as recreation. However, no irrigation facilities were built and the project has no irrigation obligations. Hydroelectric power generation and flood control are the primary purposes of the dam. The dam, reservoir, and surrounding area are used for recreation.

== Description ==
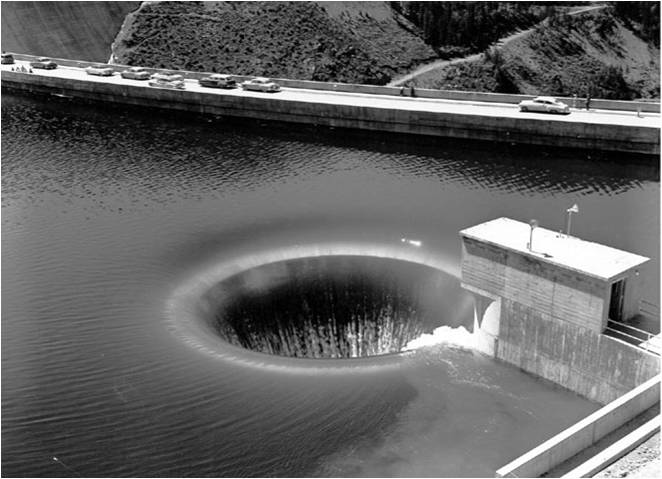
Spillway

At 564 feet (172 m) in height, the dam was the third largest and second highest concrete dam in the world at the time of its completion in 1953, with a volume of 3,100,000 cubic yards (2,400,000 m^{3}). The dam's spillway is the highest morning glory structure in the world. The spillway is controlled by a 64-by-12-foot (19.5 by 3.7 m) ring gate. The surface elevation of the reservoir is 3,560 feet (1,085 m) above sea level.

The dam is managed to provide beneficial flow conditions and to provide safe passage for migrating juvenile fish to reach the Columbia River Estuary and the Pacific Ocean.

== History ==
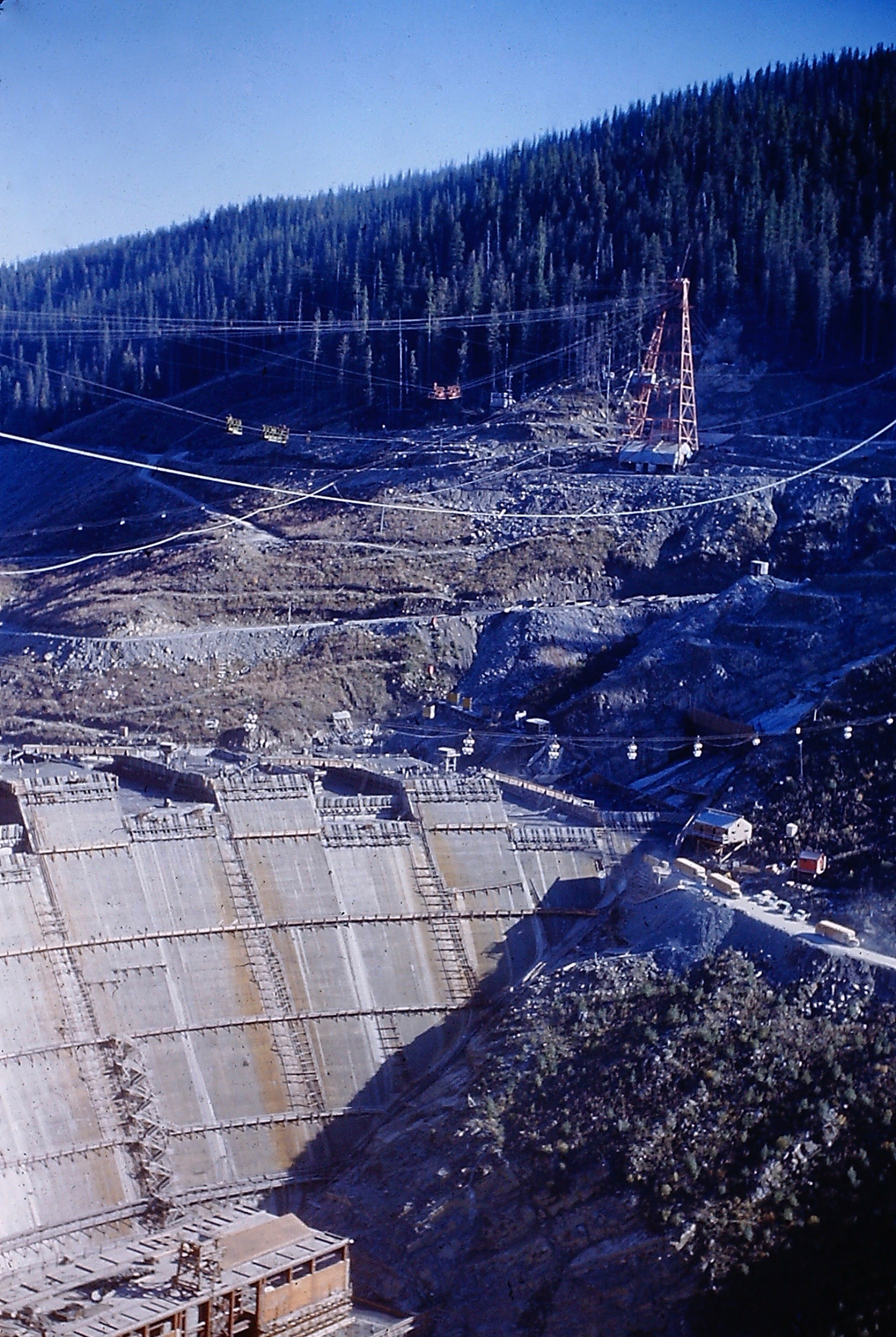
Dam under construction (September 1951)

Construction was authorized by the Act of June 5, 1944 (58 Stat. 270, Public Law 78-329). In April 1948, Reclamation awarded the $43.4 million dam construction contract to Morrison-Knudsen, General Construction Company, and Shea Company. The Guy F. Atkinson Company won the contract to divert the river during dam construction. Two timber companies, Wixson and Crowe and J. H. Trisdale, cleared seven thousand acres (2,800 ha) to make way for the reservoir. Construction officially began with a weekend of ceremonies in June 1948. In September 1949, workers poured the first concrete. The project eventually used 3 million cubic yards of concrete. Engineers adopted air-entrained concrete to reduce the effect of freeze-thaw cycles and to make the material more stable and workable. They also incorporated fly ash into the concrete mix. Hungry Horse was the first dam built with these innovations. The construction claimed the lives of 23 men.

Construction was completed on July 18, 1953. At a ceremony on October 1, 1952, President Harry S. Truman threw a switch to start power generation. The road across the dam opened to the public on November 2, 1953.

== Hydroelectric power generation ==
The project contributes to hydroelectric power generation not only at Hungry Horse Dam, but by storing and releasing water for use by downriver hydroelectric dams on the Flathead, Clark Fork, Pend Oreille, and Columbia rivers. About a billion kilowatt–hours are generated annually at Hungry Horse Dam, while in an average year the release water will generate about 4.6 billion kilowatt–hours of power as it passes through the series of downstream powerplants.

Power generating facilities at Hungry Horse Dam are housed in a building constructed across the river channel at the downstream toe of the dam. The original design included four 71,250-kilowatt generators—a total of 285 megawatts installed capacity. The generator capacity was uprated in the 1990s to 107,000 kilowatts each for a total capacity of 428 megawatts.

Nearby and downstream, the Anaconda Aluminum Co Columbia Falls Reduction Plant, an aluminum production plant was constructed in the mid-1950s, northeast of Columbia Falls.

== Tributaries ==
The Hungry Horse Reservoir is fed by a number of smaller creeks and streams, including:

West side:	East side:
Alpha Creek; Beta Creek; Doris Creek; Endor Creek; Lost Johnny Creek; Alice Creek; Maggie Creek; Wounded Buck Creek; Lid Creek; Argall Creek; Elya Creek; Flossy Creek; Clayton Creek; Knieff Creek; Emma Creek; Pearl Creek; Mazie Creek; Graves Creek; Baker Creek; Emperor Creek; Forest Creek; Wheeler Creek; Czar Creek; Heinrude Creek; Sullivan Creek; Quintonkon Creek; Battery Creek; Clark Creek; Elam Creek	Emery Creek; Hungry Horse Creek; Solander Creek; Fire Creek; Spring Meadow Creek; Ada Creek; Ryle Creek; Seagrid Creek; Dudley Creek; Riverside Creek; Murray Creek; McInernie Creek; Deep Creek; Ruby Creek; Clorinda Creek; Canyon Creek; Kimmerly Creek; Harris Creek; Felix Creek; Paint Creek; Betty Creek; Logan Creek; South Fork Logan Creek; Devils Corkscrew Creek; Hoke Creek; Baptiste Creek; Deadhorse Creek; Peters Creek; Brush Creek; Dry Park Creek; South Fork Dry Park Creek

== Sabotage plan ==
The U.S. intelligence, during the Cold War, uncovered a KGB and East German Stasi plan to sabotage major American infrastructures, including the Hungry Horse Dam. According to reports the plan was to damage the power grid and water management system by sabotaging the dam’s turbines or spillways. This would cause a flooding event and economic disruption. The plan was never carried out, but declassified documents and defectors’ testimonies like Vasili Mitrokhin show that the Soviet Union and East Germany had such a list of American targets.

== See also ==
- List of dams in the Columbia River watershed
