= Ursuline Academy (Great Falls, Montana) =

- U.S. National Register of Historic Places
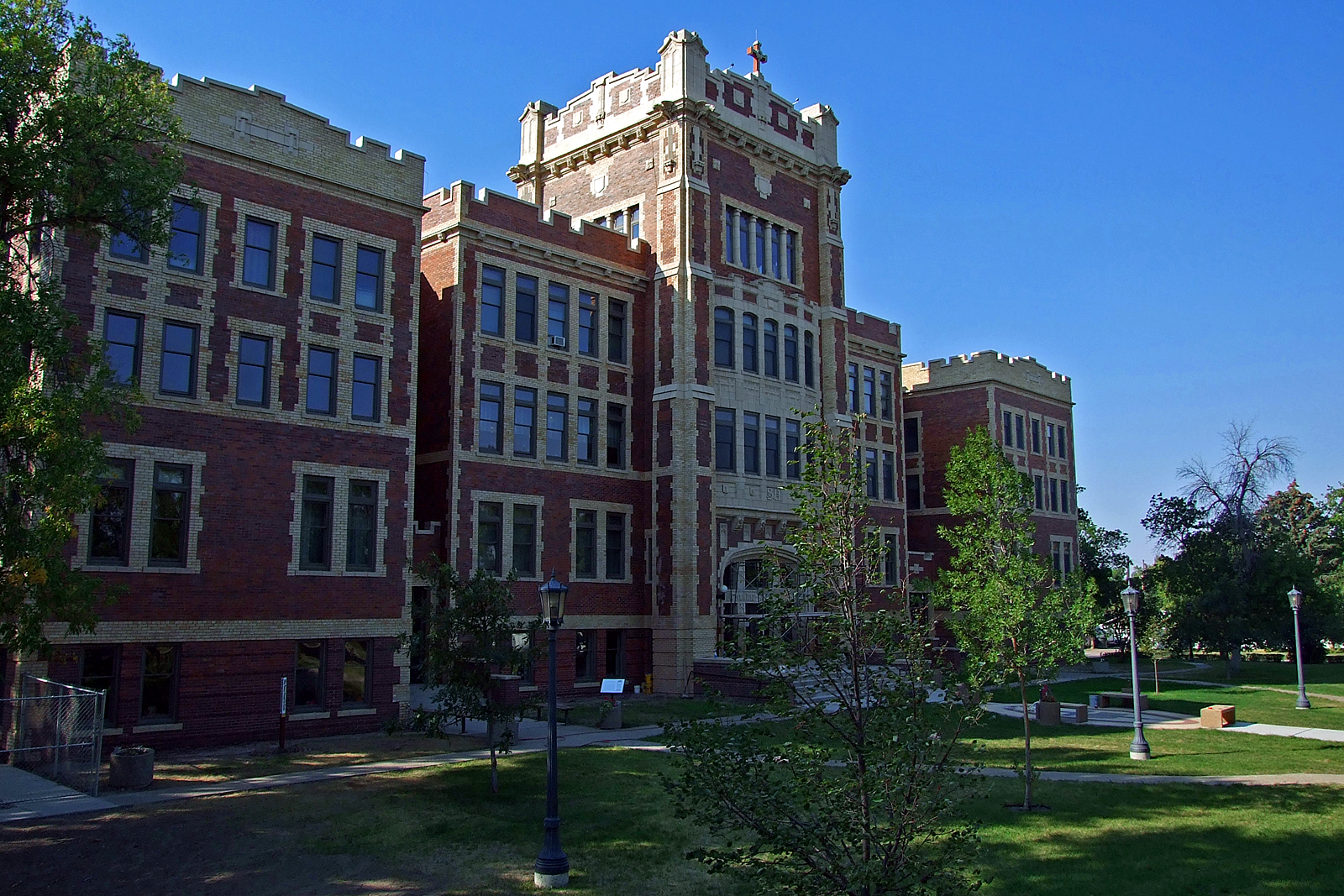
- Looking southwest at the north entrance of Ursuline Academy
- Location: 2300 Central Avenue, Great Falls, Montana, U.S.
- Coordinates: 47.50469°N 111.26694°W
- Built: 1912
- Architect: George Shanley
- Architectural style: Collegiate Gothic Revival
- NRHP reference No.: 91001447
- Added to NRHP: September 26, 1991

The Ursuline Academy is a historic convent and former Catholic school located at 2300 Central Avenue in Great Falls, Montana, in the United States. Constructed by the Ursuline Sisters, a Catholic religious institute for women, the building was complete in 1912. It was originally known as the Ursuline Academy Boarding and Day School, a school for children age five to 12.

The building came to be known as Ursuline Centre in 1971. Ursuline sisters continued to live in the building, but rented out its classrooms and kitchen spaces as a retreat center and a meeting place. As of 2012, only one Ursuline sister continued to live at the site.

The building was listed on the National Register of Historic Places on September 26, 1991.

== Construction of the building ==
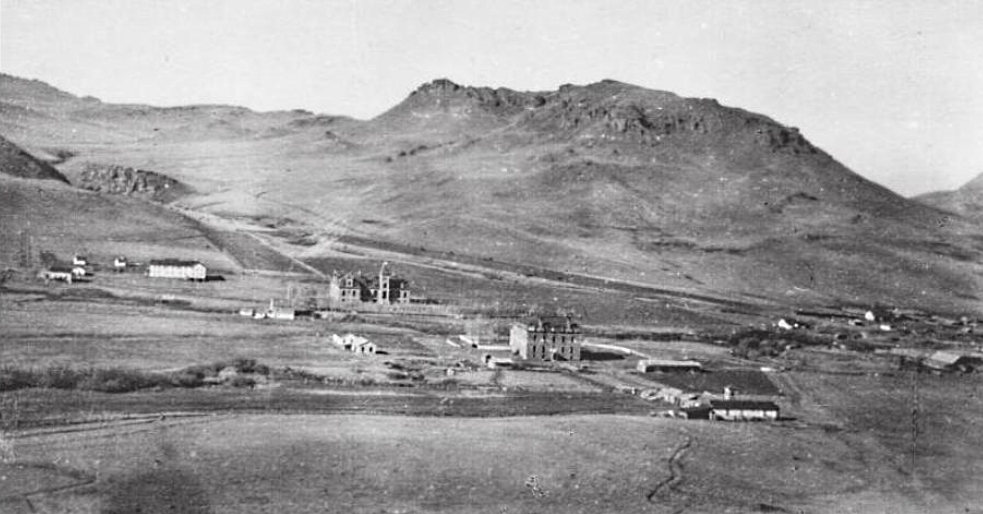
View of St. Peter's Mission between 1896 and 1908. The Ursuline stone convent and school is center-left. The original wood frame girls' school is center-right and low (with bell tower).

In March 1860, Jesuit priests established St. Peter's Mission on the Sun River about 8 miles (13 km) upriver from Fort Shaw, Montana. They moved the mission 2 miles (3.2 km) downstream in 1862, but this location proved difficult for agriculture. In April 1866 the mission moved again, this time to a position 2 miles (3.2 km) south of Bird Tail Rock (which is 15 miles (24 km) south of the modern town of Simms, Montana). The mission closed almost immediately due to hostility from the Piegan Blackfeet, but reopened in 1874. The mission moved again in 1881 to Birch Creek (a point about 9 miles (14 km) west-northwest of Cascade, Montana). In January 1884, the new (and founding) Bishop of the Roman Catholic Diocese of Helena, Jean-Baptiste Brondel, invited the Ursuline religious order to join the Jesuits at St. Peter's Mission and assist them in teaching converted Native Americans. Leader of the Toledo chapter, Mother Amadeus (Sarah Therese Dunne), led five Ursulines to St. Peter's in October. They quickly established a boarding school for girls (open to children of settlers and Native Americans). The Jesuits gave the nuns a farm to help them survive, and promised to pay them $200 a year to teach boys if more nuns could be brought to the mission. The Ursulines built a large stone building between 1882 and 1887 which served as their school and convent. The school later moved into a two-story wood-frame building, and the sisters built a bakery, barn, corral, laundry, and workers' housing. The Ursulines—who believed in music and art training as well as education in reading, math, and science—also built a three-story opera house at St. Peter's in 1896.

In 1908, the wood frame Ursuline school at St. Peter's Mission burned to the ground. The Ursulines decided to move the center of their activity to nearby Great Falls, which was founded in 1883. The sisters were strongly supported by Bishop Mathias Lenihan, who led the Roman Catholic Diocese of Great Falls (which had formed in 1904). The Great Falls Townsite Company offered them any two city blocks. The Ursulines choose an area bordered by Central Avenue, 25th Street South, 2nd Avenue South, and 23rd Street South. The area was on a slight hill with a good view and relatively distant from the busy downtown commercial district.

Mother Francis Siebert oversaw the design and construction of the new building, which was named Ursuline Academy. The city agreed to close a block of 1st Avenue South and 24th Street South to create a unified grounds for the Ursulines. Noted local architect George H. Shanley designed the structure in a variation on the Gothic Revival style known as Collegiate Gothic Revival. Shanley donated a portion of his fee to the sisters, while contributions from the community and loans paid for the building. The Anaconda Copper Company, which owned the huge copper smelter in town, contributed the bricks. The cornerstone was laid in September 1911. Construction by the local firm of Leighland Kleppe and Company began in October 1911, and a pulley system, powered by horses, hauled brick and mortar into the air to the workmen. The school opened for students on September 3, 1912. Ursuline Academy was constructed on the northwest corner of the property. The north side of the structure was its main entrance. The eastern half of the property consisted of large gardens.

Two rooms of note were furnished at the time Ursuline Academy was completed. The first, the Green Parlor, was designed for entertaining guests, hosting teas, and special occasions. It was furnished with green rugs, upholstered furniture, and lightly tinted, translucent green window draperies. The room contained an 1840 harp made in France which was the property of Mother Angela Lincoln (a relative of Abraham Lincoln) and a baby grand piano manufactured by the Steinway company. The piano was the gift of a student, whose father gave it to her as a graduation present. The other room was the Bishop's Parlor, a private suite for the bishop and important visitors. The suite consisted of a sitting room, bedroom, and bath room. The sitting room was furnished with finely carved dark oak furniture and bookcases retrieved from St. Peter's Mission, and the bedroom with dressers made of cherry.

== History of the building ==
The Ursuline Academy originally was open only to girls. When the school opened, enrollment consisted of 40 boarders, 25 day students, and 30 part-time music students. The Ursuline Sisters expanded their educational offerings in 1920, and created Ursuline High School. It was housed within the academy building. Rapid expansion in enrollment led to the construction of a detached gymnasium south of the western end of the building in 1925. The school began accepting boys in 1927. An annex was built against the gymnasium to permit boarding of male students. Classes were strictly segregated, as were the playground and yards.

1927 was also the year that the Ursuline Academy chapel was painted. The chapel is original to the building, and was blessed in 1912. The Stations of the Cross which hang on the walls were made in the 1890s, and the lectern originally used at St. Peter's Mission. Three large scenes, painted by Sister (later Mother) Raphael Schweda in 1927, hang behind the altar. Depicted are Saint Ursula leading a group of martyred virgins into heaven, and Saint Angela Merici (founder of the Ursuline order) surrounded by a group of young women. The third painting depicts a group of cherubs and angels. Female students at Ursuline Academy were used as models for the young women following Saint Ursula, and the faces of women in the paintings are recognizable as alumni of the school. There are also eight stained glass windows at the front and along the sides of the chapel, and the altar is flanked by statues of Joseph and Mary.

For five decades, the room on the fifth floor in the tower was used as an art studio. Mother Raphael used it as her classroom, and only art students were permitted access. Since the classroom lacked water, Mother Raphael carried buckets of water up to the room each day. (Mother Raphael also painted backdrops for plays at the Great Falls Civic Center, and made vestments for Catholic priests in many area churches.)

The Columbus Hospital School of Nursing opened in the city in 1898, and during World War II it greatly expanded its enrollment to meet wartime needs. Students in the nursing school slept in the Ursuline building with alongside the boarding school students. In 1950, Ursuline High School merged with two other Catholic high schools in the city to form Great Falls Central High School. This school opened on the northeast corner of the Ursuline property at 2400 Central Avenue. Throughout the 1950s and 1960s, Ursuline Academy also operated a candy store on its premises (with sweets manufactured by one of the sisters).

Expansion of the Catholic educational system in the city of Great Falls in the 1950s and 1960s led to the creation of many more elementary and junior high schools with larger, modern facilities. Enrollment at Ursuline Academy dropped steadily, and the elementary school closed in 1966. The high school closed in 1973, and the Great Falls Public Schools purchased the building in 1975.

With the impending loss of the high school, Ursuline Academy's days as an educational institution came to a close. The institution changed its name to Ursuline Centre in 1971. The Ursuline sisters continued to live in the building (treating it as a retirement home), but the building changed its function. The sisters began renting the facility for meetings and retreats, using the dormitory space for guest sleeping quarters and the old school kitchens to provide food service. To continue the educational function of the Ursulines, a portion of the building was rented out as a day care center.

In 1997, the Ursuline Centre Historical Foundation was formed as a nonprofit entity to accept grants on behalf of the Ursuline Centre, manage the building, and operate the retreat. The foundation also assists the religious order in maintaining the building. A capital campaign to make much-needed repairs on the building began in 1998, and by September 2002 had raised $1.3 million. Although the campaign's original goal was to eventually raise $1.5 million, rising costs led the campaign leaders to raise the goal to $2 million. The foundation initially repaired the roof and replaced the building's 501 windows. In 2006, the electrical and plumbing systems were upgraded.

In 2010, the Ursulines entered into negotiations to transfer ownership of their building to the Ursuline Centre Historical Foundation. The Ursulines offered to sell the building outright to the foundation for $200,000, but the foundation declined. Although the foundation had the money to fund the purchase, the purchase would leave its funds nearly depleted—leaving nothing to continue making repairs. The building's exterior needed extensive conservation and maintenance work, and the fire-suppression system needed replacing. The foundation estimated this work would require $1 million. Although the sale fell through, the Ursulines agreed to give the foundation the right-of-first-refusal on any sale in the future. In addition, the Ursuline Order said it was eliminating its financial support of the retreat. To improve the center's financial viability, the Ursulines and foundation considered turning the former nuns' quarters (which were in excellent condition) into a retirement home for women, and finding more groups willing to use the busy retreat on weekdays.

At the time of the building's 100th anniversary in September 2012, more than $3 million had been spent to renovate and restore the structure. Replacement of the boiler and the electrical system had occurred, and work on the exterior was proceeding. Talks between the Ursulines and the foundation continued, in an attempt to reach agreement on a way to transfer ownership of the structure to the nonprofit.

== About the building ==
The Ursuline Academy is a four-story building with a five-story central tower, and is constructed of stone and brick. The facade is trimmed with terra cotta with impressions of geometric forms. Stepped parapets exist on the main tower and wings. As originally constructed, the academy had 64,000 square feet (5,900 m^{2}) of internal space. Eight gargoyles sit atop the central tower. According to the Great Falls Tribune in September 2012, they are thought to be the only working gargoyles in the entire state. The property on which the building sits is about 60 percent smaller than it originally was, due to the sale of the high school and its football field to the city in 1974.

Icons throughout the building were painted by Mother Raphael Schweda. The chapel remains largely unaltered since its completion in 1927. Mother Raphael's fifth-floor classroom is now an art gallery featuring many of her works, which include portraits, religious images, and floral paintings.

The building's Amadeus Library, named for Mother Amadeus, contains an extensive of collection of early- and mid-20th century books and musical instruments. It also houses the archives for the Pacific Northwest Chapter of the Ursuline order.

The long second floor hallway is now known as the Heritage Gallery. Photographs of graduating classes, portraits of nuns and students, diplomas, and other memorabilia hang in this hallway. At the end of the hallway in a former girls' dormitory room is the Heritage Museum, which documents the history of the Ursulines in Montana and at Ursuline Academy. The museum also contains many Native American beadwork items and dresses donated to the Ursulines by tribes in Montana. Antique clocks, hand-carved chairs, and intricately detailed tables—many made by the sisters at St. Peter's Mission—are also housed in the museum. A painting of St. Peter's Mission by contemporary artist Ralph DeCamp also hangs in the room.

Chimes, original to the building, also still exist on the second floor. Capable of being heard through the building, each sister had a different signal which could be played on the chimes to summon her to the central office. The chimes were also used to call the sisters to chapel, and for signalling the start and end of classes.

The Ursuline Academy's meeting and retreat center can accommodate up to 100 people in dormitory rooms on the third and fourth floors. Space exists for multiple groups to use the facility at one time. The center also has a kitchen and kitchen staff of four. A 260-seat auditorium with stage exists on the second floor. As of 2011, the Ursuline Academy also was home to a preschool and day-care center.

== Other buildings on the site ==
The Ursuline Sisters partnered with the Sisters of Providence in 1932 to establish Great Falls Junior College for Women (a two-year post-secondary school) adjacent to the Ursuline Academy. The college was built on the northeast corner of the property. But the financial distress caused by the Great Depression caused the building to lie unfinished for decades. To accommodate the students, the college opened on September 8, 1932, in the Ursuline Academy. The college was diocesan, and not controlled by either religious order. The original enrollment was 14.

It became a coeducational college in 1937 known as Great Falls Junior College. By 1950, it had moved out of Ursuline Academy and was holding classes in the Old Columbus Hospital building at 1601 2nd Avenue North.

After a reorganization of the Ursulines in 1958, the sisters agreed that they could no longer support the college. The Ursulines relinquished control of the junior college in 1960. The Sisters of Providence moved it to its present site between 20th and 23rd Streets South on 12th Street South. It is now known as the University of Great Falls.

== Bibliography ==
- Aarstad, Rich; Arguimbau, Ellen; Baumler, Ellen; Porsild, Charlene L.; and Shovers, Brian. Montana Place Names: From Alzada to Zortman. Helena, Mont.: Montana Historical Society Press, 2009.
- Federal Writers' Project. Montana: A State Guide Book. 3d rev. ed. New york: Hastings House, 1949.
- Harrod, Howard L. Mission Among the Blackfeet. Norman, Okla.: University of Oklahoma Press, 1971.
- Porter, Francis Xavier and Scott, Kristi D. Ursuline Sisters of Great Falls. Charleston, S.C.: Arcadia Publishing, 2012.
- Robison, Ken. Cascade County and Great Falls. Charleston, S.C.: Arcadia Publishing, 2011.
- Schrems, Suzanne. Uncommon Women, Unmarked Trails: The Courageous Journey of Catholic Missionary Sisters in Frontier Montana. Norman, Okla.: Horse Creek Publications, 2003.
- Small, Lawrence F. Religion in Montana: Pathways to the Present. Billings, Mont.: Rocky Mountain College, 1992.
