= Shinny (disambiguation) =

Shinny is an informal type of ice hockey.

Shinny may also refer to:

== People ==
- Shinny Bayaar (born 1977), Mongolian professional boxer
- Tom Shinny (born 1899), an Irish hurler

== Other uses ==
- Shinney, a North American game played with a buffalo-hair ball
- Moonshine, high-proof distilled spirits, generally produced illicitly
- A variant of mini hockey played indoors on one's knees

== See also ==
- Andrew Shinnie, (born 1989), Scottish professional footballer
- Shinty, a Scottish team game played with sticks and a ball
- Pond hockey, a form of ice hockey
