= Camp Cooke =

Camp Cooke may refer to:

- Vandenberg Space Force Base, a U.S. Air Force Base in California originally named Camp Cooke
- Camp Cooke (Montana), the first U.S. Army post established in Montana, 1866
- Camp Cooke, another name for Camp Taji a U.S. Army base in Taji, Iraq
