= Patricia E. Kelly =

African-American cowgirl and businesswoman

Patricia Kelly
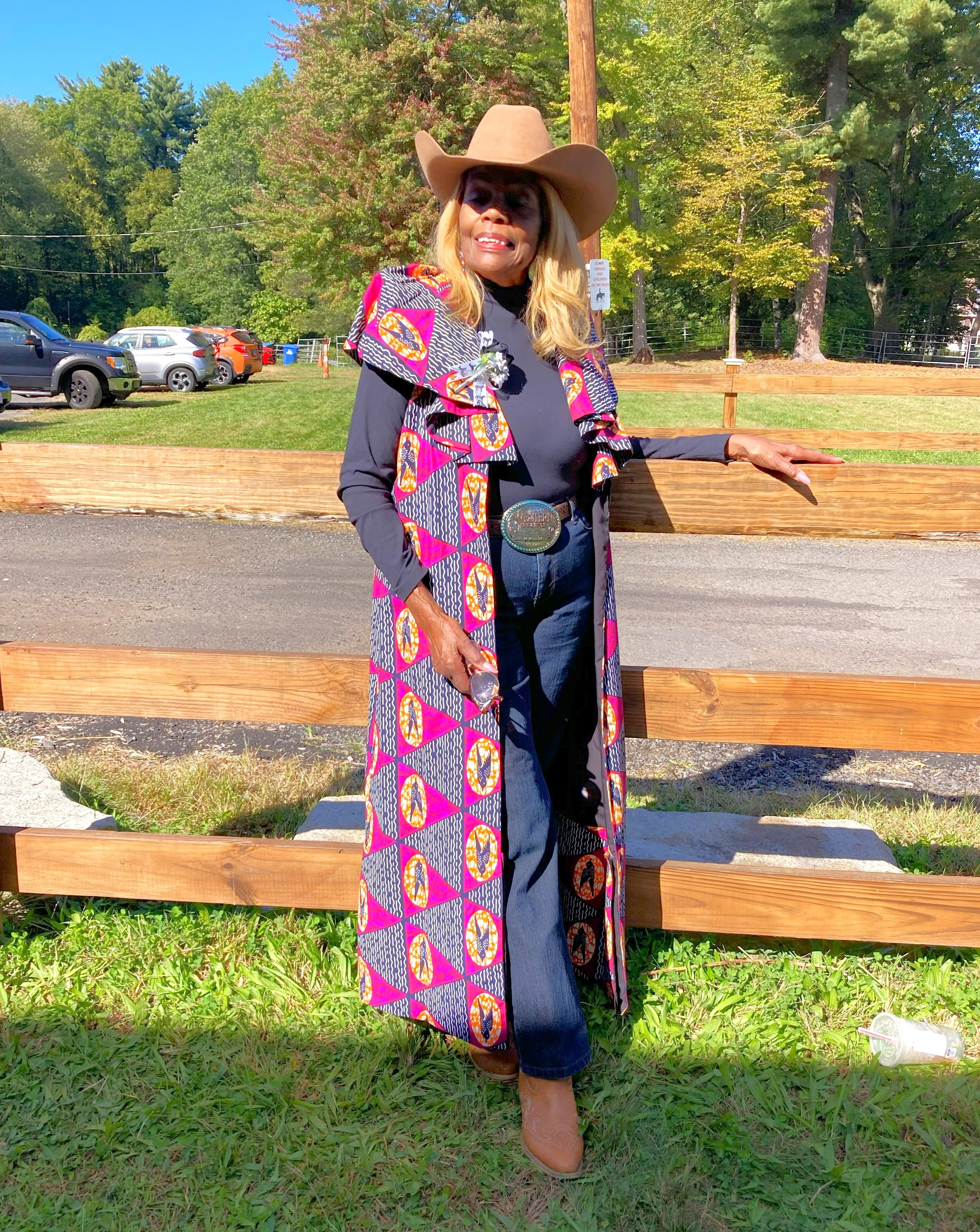
- Kelly at the October 2025 grand opening of the Mary Fields Horse & Heritage Museum located on the campus of Ebony Horsewomen, Inc. in Hartford, CT
- Born: c. 1950 (age c. 75)
- Allegiance: United States

Patricia E. Kelly (born c. 1950) is an African-American urban cowgirl, and founder and CEO of the non-profit organization Ebony Horsewomen, Inc., in Hartford, Connecticut. She is a trained equestrian instructor, certified as a Master Urban Riding and Equine Husbandry instructor as well as an Equine Assisted Growth specialist. Kelly, considered an equestrian trailblazer, has been recognized as one of CNN’s Top 10 Heroes of 2014 and as one of Aetna’s Champions for Change.

== Early life ==
Patricia was born and grew up in Hartford, Connecticut. It is one of the richest cities in the United States, but it has a great disparity between the rich and the poor. She felt the effects of such income inequality.

From a young age, she was passionate about horse riding and horses, and watched the many Western series on television. At nine years old, she learned how to ride thanks to her neighbor, a Jewish grocer who owned a horse. He taught her everything he knew about horses and riding

She served the United States as a U.S. Marine during the Vietnam War. In 1984, she founded Ebony Horsewomen, a non-profit organization originally planned to support adult Black women riders.

By 1987, the organization had enlarged its focus from women to children. It created a variety of programs to give more of the city’s youth a positive outlet and opportunities to develop.

Kelly was chosen as one of the 2014 Top Ten CNN Heroes.
