= Fort Shaw =

- Cascade County, Montana, United States

Site information
- Owner: Public
- Controlled by: United States Department of the Interior
- Open to the public: Yes
- Condition: Partially demolished; Surviving structures in excellent condition

Location
- Coordinates: 47°30′32″N 111°49′12″W

Site history
- Built: June 30, 1867
- Built by: United States Army

Garrison information
- Garrison: 13th Infantry Regiment (1867–1870), 7th Infantry Regiment (1870–1878), 3rd U.S. Infantry Regiment (1878–1888), 25th Infantry Regiment (1888–1891)

- Fort Shaw Historic District and Cemetery
- U.S. National Register of Historic Places
- Built: July–August 1867
- NRHP reference No.: 85000065
- Added to NRHP: January 11, 1985

Fort Shaw (originally named Camp Reynolds) was a United States Army fort located on the Sun River 24 miles west of Great Falls, Montana, in the United States. It was founded on June 30, 1867, and abandoned by the Army in July 1891. It later served as a school for Native American children from 1892 to 1910. Portions of the fort survive today as a small museum. The fort lent its name to the community of Fort Shaw, Montana, which grew up around it.

Fort Shaw is part of the Fort Shaw Historic District and Cemetery, which was added to the National Register of Historic Places on January 11, 1985.

== Founding the fort ==
Most of what was to become Montana became part of the United States with the Louisiana Purchase of 1803. Although first organized into an incorporated territory in 1805 as part of the Louisiana Territory, it was not until large numbers of farmers, miners, and fur trappers began moving into the region in the 1850s that the government of the United States paid much attention to the area. (Note: The northwest portion of the state west of the continental divide was incorporated as the Oregon Territory in 1848. This portion was ceded to the Washington Territory in 1853, and then to the Idaho Territory in 1863. The rest of the state was ceded from the Louisiana Territory to the Missouri Territory in 1812, from the Missouri Territory to the Nebraska Territory in 1854, from the Nebraska Territory to the Dakota Territory in 1861, and then ceded to the Idaho Territory in 1863.) The creation of the Montana Territory in 1864 came about, in part, due to the rapid influx of miners after the gold strikes of 1862 to 1864 in the southwest part of the state.

Camp Reynolds was established on the site on June 30, 1867. (Note: The camp was named for Union Army Major General John F. Reynolds, who committed the Army of the Potomac to the Battle of Gettysburg and was killed at the start of the battle.) The camp was established by Major William Clinton, in command of four companies of the 13th Infantry Regiment. The site was about 20 miles (32 km) upstream from the confluence of the Sun and Missouri rivers. (Note: Following the winding Sun River, the site was 25 miles (40 km) upstream, but far less in a straight line. Many sources often use the longer, stream-side figure, which can cause confusion.) It was about 5 miles (8.0 km) upstream from the point where the Mullan Road crossed the river. It was also about 12 miles (19 km) upstream from the site of the former St. Peter's Mission, which had been evacuated in April 1866 after the Piegan Blackfeet killed four white settlers nearby (one almost on the doorstep of the mission). The first Blackfeet Indian Agency office, established in 1854 by Isaac Stevens (Governor of the Washington Territory), was also nearby. The 13th Infantry Regiment previously established Camp Cooke near the mouth of the Judith River in July 1866, and Camp Reynolds was intended to keep the Mullan Road open and prohibit further Native American attacks on settlements to the south.

On July 4, 1867, the United States Department of the Army issued orders to have the name of the encampment changed to Fort Shaw in honor of Colonel Robert Gould Shaw, a Union Army officer who commanded the all-black 54th Regiment Massachusetts Volunteer Infantry during the American Civil War. The post's name was changed on August 1, 1867. Initially, Fort Shaw was to have had barracks space for six companies of infantry, but this was scaled back to four companies after the U.S. Army decided to build Fort Ellis near present-day Bozeman, Montana. Fort Shaw, along with Fort Ellis, was one of two principal U.S. Army forts intended to protect the burgeoning mining settlements of south-central and southwest Montana.

== Construction of the fort ==
When first established, Fort Shaw consisted of officers and men housed in canvas tents. Construction of log cabin housing began in August 1867, and by late fall the men had constructed barracks for half the soldiers, a temporary storehouse, and three officers' huts. But only half of the post hospital was erected before cold weather forced construction to halt and the men to enter winter quarters. The finished buildings were only barely habitable and the men and officers very cramped, but the winter was not a harsh one. The remaining structures were raised and finished in the spring and summer of 1868. During 1869, the structures were made more comfortable and military decorations added. Floors were hard-packed dirt (and remained so throughout the fort's existence).

Fort Shaw was constructed around a square parade ground 400 feet (120 m) on each side. The interior and exterior building walls were made of adobe bricks 6 by 4 by 12 inches (15 by 10 by 30 cm) in size. Exterior walls were 18 inches (46 cm) thick, while interior walls were 12 inches (30 cm) thick. The interior walls of the seven officers' quarters were finished in white plaster, and had glass windows set in white-painted wood casements. There were four U-shaped infantry barracks, each 102 feet (31 m) on a side and with 9-foot (2.7 m) ceilings. Barracks walls were unfinished, and had four windows (3 by 4 feet (0.91 by 1.22 m) in size). Each barracks contained several rooms: A sergeant's room (15 by 15 feet (4.6 by 4.6 m)), a storeroom (15 by 14 feet (4.6 by 4.3 m)), a mess room (18 by 40 feet (5.5 by 12.2 m)), kitchen (18 by 18 feet (5.5 by 5.5 m)), laundry (15 by 15 feet (4.6 by 4.6 m)), and sleeping quarters/recreation room (20 by 30 feet (6.1 by 9.1 m)). Roofs were boards at first, but shingled as shingles became available. (Note: Shingling was not completed until roughly 1896.)

A number of other buildings were also constructed. These included a commissary and quartermaster storehouse (90 by 90 feet (27 by 27 m)), which in its interior included a commissary officer's office (16 by 14 feet (4.9 by 4.3 m)); a company clerk's office (13 by 14 feet (4.0 by 4.3 m)); a room for issuing stores (30 by 15 feet (9.1 by 4.6 m)); two storerooms (27 by 30 feet (8.2 by 9.1 m)); and a quartermaster's office (27 by 30 feet (8.2 by 9.1 m)). The U-shaped storehouse also had a cellar and a (30 by 60 feet (9.1 by 18.3 m)) yard, enclosed by a gate. Other buildings included a guardhouse (with stone prison cells) and quarters for the company band (68 by 68 feet (21 by 21 m), with a 9-foot (2.7 m) high ceiling); a T-shaped hospital (82 by 86 feet (25 by 26 m)); two-story commanding officer's quarters (37 by 37 feet (11 by 11 m)), with bedroom, dining room, sitting room, kitchen, servants' room, and two garret rooms; and duplex officers' quarters (15 by 15 feet (4.6 by 4.6 m)), each including a front room, back room, kitchen, servants' room, garret room, and a shared single mess room. A chapel, post school, library, bakery, ordnance (weapons and ammunition) room, magazine, water tanks, outhouses, and outdoor brick washing sinks made up the rest of the post.

Fort Shaw was so well laid out and constructed that it was called the "queen of Montana's military posts".

A cemetery was located 0.5 miles (800 m) west of the post, and a vegetable garden about 1 mile (1,600 m) east.

== Life at the fort ==
The military reservation extended along the length of the Sun River Valley from present-day Vaughn, Montana, upstream for 10 miles (16 km). Fort Shaw was located almost on the slopes of Shaw Butte, which was two-thirds of the way up the valley to the west, and was about 40 feet (12 m) above the river. The river was shallow and easily forded almost anywhere along its length, except during the spring freshets.

Food was largely imported. A limited supply of fish was obtained from the Sun River, which at that time was a clear, swift-running stream with a stony bottom. Wild game (bighorn sheep, black-tailed deer, elk, pronghorn, and white-tailed deer), ducks, geese, prairie chicken, rabbits, and sage-grouse were often hunted for food, but were scarce in the area and not relied on heavily for food. Nearby ranches supplied the post with vegetables, albeit at very high prices. Flour was usually shipped in from the east, as the Montana-grown summer wheat produced bread which was dark and heavy. (Note: Military officials believed this was in part due to the quality of the wheat grown, and the low quality of the flour mills in Montana.)

Fuel was scarce. Wood grew only sparsely in the valley, and the post imported wood logs for fuel and construction at the cost of $10 per cord ($2.8/m^{3}) from the foothills of the Rocky Mountains about 20 miles (32 km) to the west. (Note: This is about $242 per cord in 2025 dollars.) Lignite coal was obtained from mines in the Dearborn River valley, about 30 miles (48 km) away, and used for both heating and cooking.

Water, too, was a problem. The valley was very well-drained by the river, and no springs were located near the post. Water was obtained by digging a long trench from the river to the post. Although a steam engine was later used to pump water from the river to various building via wooden pipes, these pipes often became clogged or froze in winter. Below-ground wooden pipes were laid in 1885 to rectify the problem.

Forage for animals was also an issue. Since the strong drainage inhibited the growth of grass, hay had to be imported from elsewhere in Montana, primarily the Missouri River valley to the east.

Disease was common. Influenza, fever, and diarrhea (particularly in the spring) were common. Although smallpox regularly killed hundreds of Native Americans in the area each year, few members of the Army came down with the disease.

Fort Shaw was not an isolated post. Mail was delivered three times a week, the fort served as a post office for the local populace, and there was a telegraph office for both civilian and military use. (Note: The telegraph was installed by December 1869.)

== History of the fort ==
=== Early leadership ===
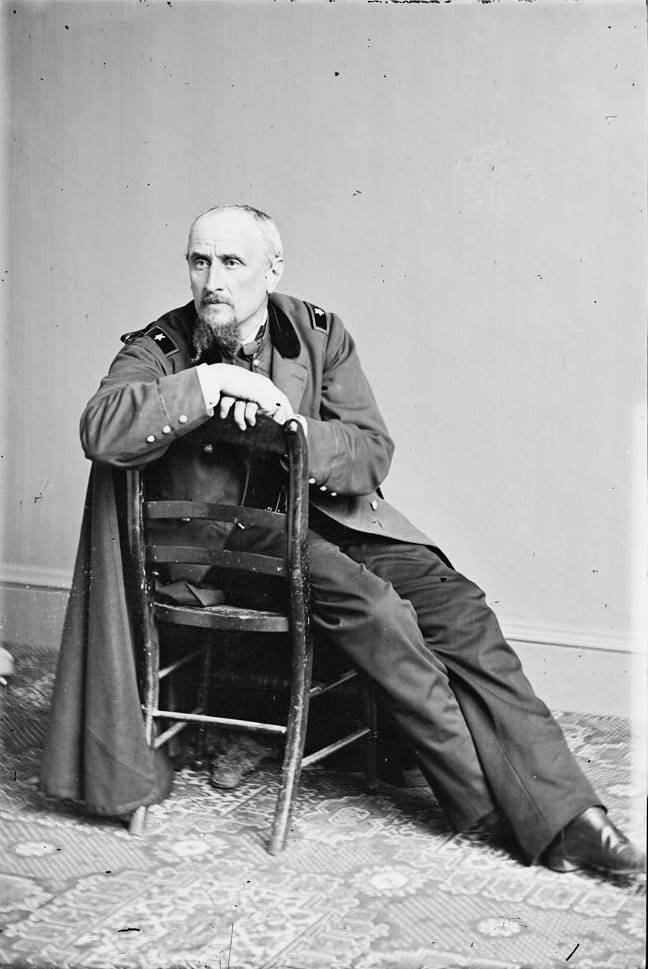
Colonel Phillipe Régis de Trobriand, about the time he commanded Fort Shaw in 1869.

Major William Clinton's command of Fort Shaw was only temporary. On August 11, 1867, Colonel Isaac Van Duzen Reeve transferred the 13th Infantry Regiment's headquarters to Fort Shaw. Lieutenant Colonel G. L. Andrews was regimental second-in-command, and named headquarters commandant, overseeing the operations of the fort itself. During their tenure at the fort, a steam engine was brought in to pump water from the river to the kitchens and sinks. The unit also received breech-loading rifles, which greatly increased its effectiveness. About 33 civilians were employed at the fort as well, working as blacksmiths, carpenters, clerks, masons, and saddlers. One of Colonel Reeve's first actions was to disarm the Montana Militia, a short-lived paramilitary organization formed by Acting Governor Thomas Francis Meagher in 1864 and supplied with arms by the U.S. Army. Reeve acted quickly, and the militia was disbanded by October 1, 1867.

General Phillipe Régis de Trobriand took command of Fort Shaw on June 4, 1869. A steam engine (whether a second one or a replacement is unclear) was brought to the fort in 1869. Excessive drinking and desertion by his troops were a constant problem. General Trobriand and the 13th Infantry Regiment left Fort Shaw on June 11, 1870. His unit was replaced by the headquarters company and six companies of the 7th Infantry Regiment, commanded by Colonel John Gibbon.

=== Command of Colonel Gibbon and fighting in the Indian Wars ===
Gibbon worked to improve living conditions at Fort Shaw. He improved the roofing of the barracks buildings, had the exterior walls of all buildings plastered, expanded the storehouses, and expanded and improved the corrals and stables. Irrigation for the fort's vegetable garden was completed, and companies assigned to maintain each plot. In 1871, he obtained a plow for tilling the garden. He also worked to expand the fort's civilian workforce, adding carpenters, masons, and sawmill operators. Desertion and theft of fort supplies, both major problems, were also reduced.

Gibbon also worked to improve security in the area. He began surveying and constructing a road between Fort Shaw and Camp Baker (near present-day White Sulphur Springs) to provide better communications with that post and to better monitor the movements of Native American groups and bands. This so improved security in the area that Gibbon counseled against the construction of a blockhouse at Camp Baker because it would send a signal to whites that the area was still not free from Native American attack. Gibbon also used his troops to scout out the little-explored area of the Rocky Mountain Front. These explorations led to the rediscovery and accurate mapping of Lewis and Clark Pass.

The area around Fort Shaw was a hotbed of conflict between Native Americans and white settlers in the late 1860s. A series of Piegan Blackfeet and Sioux raids between 1865 and 1869 left several whites dead. In mid-1869, two innocent Piegan Blackfeet were killed in retaliation in broad daylight in the town of Fort Benton, Montana, about 55 miles (89 km) to the northeast of Fort Shaw. One of them was the brother of the Piegan leader Mountain Chief, who initiated a series of reprisals which killed about 25 white settlers. In response, General Philip Sheridan ordered Major Eugene Baker to take two companies of the 2d Cavalry Regiment from Fort Ellis and two companies of infantry from Fort Shaw and attack Mountain Chief's band of Piegans. Baker attacked the Piegans on the morning of January 23, 1870. Unfortunately, he attacked the wrong band: The Piegans were led by Heavy Runner, a Piegan Blackfeet who had signed a peace agreement with the United States. When Heavy Runner rushed out of his camp with his peace treaty in hand, he was shot dead. In what became known as the Marias Massacre, more than 173 Piegean Blackfeet (including 53 women and children) were murdered.

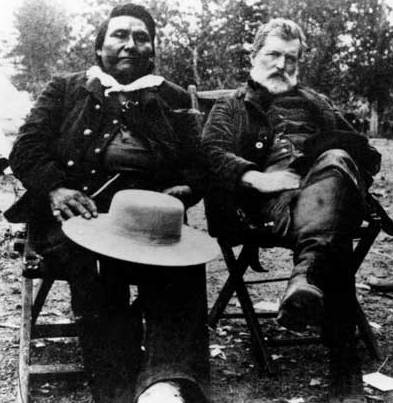
Chief Joseph of the Nez Perce and Colonel John Gibbon meet at the Big Hole National Battlefield in 1889.

Just five years later, in 1874, gold was discovered by the U.S. Army in the Black Hills of the Dakotas. A gold rush occurred in 1875 and 1876 in which thousands of white miners and settlers flooded the area in violation of several treaties guaranteeing that the Black Hills would belong to the Lakota people. Conflict between Native Americans and white settlers broke out. Responding to pleas from whites, President Ulysses S. Grant decided to clear the Black Hills of all native people. After an attack against a combined Sioux-Cheyenne village on the Powder River by General George Crook accomplished little in March 1876, General Sheridan decided on a three-pronged attack to occur in southwestern Montana in the summer of 1876. Colonel Gibbon was ordered to form a "Montana Column" from elements of at Fort Shaw and Fort Ellis, and to march south across the plains to ensure that no Native American tribes moved north or west of the Yellowstone River. After reaching the Yellowstone, he was to move downstream until he rendezvoused with a "Dakota Column", under the command of General Alfred Terry. Gibbon left Fort Shaw on March 17, 1877, with five companies (about 200 men and 12 officers), and reached Fort Ellis on March 22. In April, Gibbon left Fort Ellis with both infantry and cavalry (totalling about 450 men and officers), heading for the Yellowstone. On June 20, Gibbon's command rendezvoused with Terry at the mouth of the Rosebud River. General Terry ordered his subordinate, Lieutenant Colonel George Armstrong Custer, to proceed south along the Rosebud and then west to the Little Bighorn River. Custer was to follow the Little Bighorn River north to the Bighorn River, where he was to rendezvous with Gibbon and Terry—who were to proceed west along the Yellowstone to the Bighorn, and then south along the Bighorn to meet Custer. Subsequently, Gibbon's Fort Shaw soldiers did not participate in the Battle of the Little Bighorn on June 25–26, during which most of Custer's command was famously wiped out. Gibbon entered the valley of the Little Bighorn on June 27, where the Fort Shaw soldiers assisted in burying the dead.

Soldiers at Fort Shaw participated in another famous Indian battle in 1877. For many years, several bands of the Nez Perce people lived in the valley of the Wallowa River in northeast Oregon. But increasing white settlement in the area led to calls to have the Native Americans placed on a reservation. In May 1877, General Oliver O. Howard ordered all remaining Nez Perce onto a reservation with 30 days. Several young Native Americans killed some white settlers, leading to a reprisal by General Howard. Yet, in the Battle of White Bird Canyon on June 17, 1877, a force of about 80 Nez Perce warriors defeated a unit of 200 of Howard's artillery, cavalry, and infantry. More than 800 Nez Perce men, women, and children tried to flee over Lolo Pass into Montana to seek help from other tribes, which deeply alarmed whites in the Montana Territory. A hundred Nez Perce held off 500 U.S. Army troops at the Battle of the Clearwater on July 11–12. Colonel Gibbon hastily assembled a force of about 200 artillery, cavalry, and infantry and proceeded up the Bitterroot River into the Big Hole Basin to stop them. On August 9, Gibbon attacked with his infantry and artillery at dawn. But the Nez Perce captured his howitzer and Nez Perce sharpshooters killed 30 of his men and officers. The Battle of the Big Hole continued until August 10, as the Nez Perce pinned Gibbon's men down in a coulee. The band finally fled, 89 of their own (mostly women and children) dead. After a lengthy flight through Montana, the Nez Perce finally surrendered at the Battle of Bear Paw near Chinook, Montana, on October 5, 1877. Montana saw its last skirmishes with Native Americans in 1878.

=== Later commanders ===
In the summer of 1878, the 7th Infantry was moved to Saint Paul, Minnesota, and Fort Shaw became the headquarters of the 3rd U.S. Infantry Regiment under the command of Colonel John R. Brooke. Brooke was promoted to Lieutenant Colonel on March 20, 1879, and assigned to the 13th Infantry Regiment (then in the Dakotas). But undisclosed personnel issues kept Brooke at Fort Shaw. He was joined by Colonel Luther Prentice Bradley. There were six companies in the 3rd Infantry. Company A was assigned to Fort Benton. Companies C, E, F, and G were assigned to Fort Shaw. Company K was assigned to Fort Logan (the former Camp Baker). Companies B, D, H and I were assigned to Fort Missoula.

Life at Fort Shaw was increasingly peaceful. Company E of the 3rd Infantry was sent from Fort Shaw to Fort Ellis in the spring of 1879, and it was followed by Company C in the summer. (They stayed there until Fort Ellis closed in 1886, and then were transferred to Fort Custer, where they remained.) Companies A and K were reassigned to Fort Shaw in 1881. In the fall and summer of 1882 and 1883, at least two companies from Fort Shaw were kept in the field at all times, observing Native American movements and discouraging raids on white settlements south of the Piegan Blackfeet reservation. The peaceful life was not necessarily fun for the isolated soldiers, who often visited nearby communities to drink. In 1885, the first Independence Day celebrations occurred in Great Falls. Soldiers from Fort Shaw became roaring drunk during the day, and fired several cannonballs down Central Avenue (the city's main street) around midnight.

In April 1888, Colonel Brooke was promoted to brigadier general, and the 3rd Infantry transferred to forts in the Dakotas and Minnesota. The 25th Infantry Regiment, under the command of Colonel George Lippitt Andrews, took up station at Fort Shaw in May 1888 in its stead. By this time, Fort Shaw was no longer seen as a key fort in the Army's chain of military posts across Montana. Colonel Andrews, his headquarters company, and two companies of infantry resided at Fort Missoula, more than 200 miles (320 km) to the west over the Rocky Mountains. Just two companies of the 25th Infantry (I and K) resided at Fort Shaw, under the command of Lieutenant Colonel James J. Van Horn. These two companies were "skeletonized" in September 1890, leaving Fort Shaw with only a minimal military presence.

The construction of Fort Assinniboine (which cost $1 million to build) in 1879 led to the creation of a new center of U.S. military power in Montana far from the more settled central and southwestern parts of the state, and led to the eventual closure of Fort Shaw and Fort Ellis. (Note: The cost would be $34,553,571 in 2025 dollars.) Fort Shaw was abandoned by the U.S. Army on July 1, 1891.

== Civilian use ==
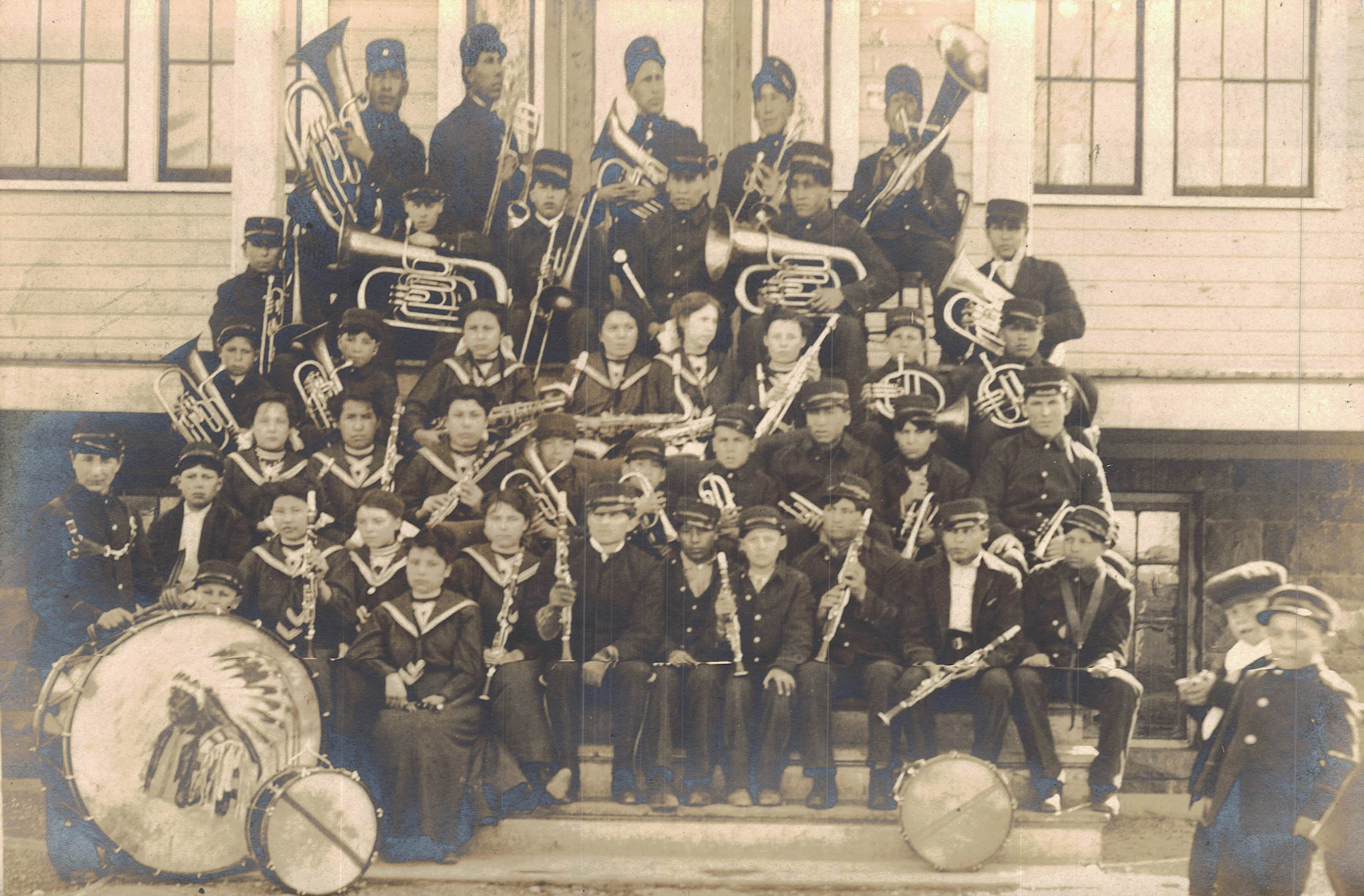
Ft. Shaw Band under Matthew Flyn, an Army man.

=== Fort Shaw Indian school ===
By 1892, the Fort Shaw military reservation totaled 29,841.5 acres (121 km^{2}). Ownership of Fort Shaw was transferred from the United States Department of War to the United States Department of the Interior on April 30, 1892. The Interior Department turned over 4,999.5 acres (20 km^{2}) to the Fort Peck Indian school on June 6, 1903. Another 4,364 acres (18 km^{2}) were turned over to the school for agricultural purposes on July 6, 1905. On July 22, 1905, President Theodore Roosevelt issued an executive order giving the Secretary of the Interior the authority to dispose of all the land of the former Fort Shaw Military Reservation, holding in reserve those acres in use by the Indian school.

By the 1880s, the United States government undertook a major initiative to pacify Native American tribes through nonviolent means. A key element in this effort was the creation of boarding schools. These schools, sometimes on reservations but just as often not, were originally run by religious groups. By the 1890s, however, the schools had been largely secularized and were being run by government employees and government-employed teachers. The goal of Indian boarding schools was two-fold: First, to strip Native American children of their language and culture, teach them the English language, and instill in them the values and cultural ways of white Americans; and second, to teach them academic subjects, vocational trades, and other skills that were valued by white American business and society.

The Fort Shaw school came into existence after the government boarding school on the Fort Peck Indian Reservation suffered severe fires in November 1891 and the fall of 1892. The school was modeled on Indian schools in Carlisle, Pennsylvania; Lawrence, Kansas; and Newkirk, Oklahoma, and was named the Fort Shaw Government Industrial Indian Boarding School, The school officially opened on December 27, 1892, with Dr. William Winslow as the school's superintendent, first teacher, and physician. It had 52 students, but by the end of 1893 enrollment had climbed to 176. Administrators and faculty were housed in the old officers' quarters, which students boarded in the former soldiers' barracks. Students ranged in age from five to 18, and came from tribes in Montana, Idaho, and Wyoming. Half of each day was spent learning English and in academic study. The rest of the day was spent working in the school's garden, stables, and pastures raising the meat and vegetables which supplied the school with food; in making uniforms and shoes for the children to wear; and in maintaining and repairing the school's buildings and furniture. (Note: By 1899, the school had 50 dairy cows and 500 head of cattle, with the goal of increasing the dairy herd to 100 and the beef cattle to 1,500 head.) The vocational curriculum was gender-specific. Girls learned to cook "white" food the "white" way, sew, clean house, make dairy products (butter, cream, skim milk) from raw milk, and engage in crocheting, lace-making, and other needlework. Boys were taught the essentials of farming and ranching, as well as skills such as blacksmithing, carpentry, construction, masonry, and woodworking. (Note: Among the school's more notable graduates was John Clarke (Kutay-puyis, Not Talking), a Piegan Blackfeet sculptor. Scarlet fever at the age of two left him a deaf-mute, and he learned woodcarving at Fort Shaw school and later St. John's School for the Deaf in Milwaukee, Wisconsin. His works were internationally exhibited and purchased by notable art collectors such as President Warren G. Harding, billionaire John D. Rockefeller, and Western artist Charles M. Russell. He is believed to be the first Blackfeet wood sculptor, and his work allegedly inspired the logo of the Great Northern Railway.) Sports were taught to both boys and girls. Girls played double ball, lacrosse, and shinny (informal ice hockey). Boys were taught baseball, football, and track.

Students at Fort Shaw usually spent their first two years at the school learning English and "white" cultural norms. Children were grouped in grades according to their skill levels, which meant that both very young children and young adults could be found in the same class. Students advanced to the next grade based on achievement, and there was no social stigma for students who stayed for a two or more years in the same grade. Fort Shaw's curriculum ended at the eighth grade, but students in their late teens (indeed, some as old as 25 years of age) could be found studying there.

Dr. Winslow resigned his position on September 9, 1898, and Frederick C. Campbell became Fort Shaw School's superintendent. At that time, the school had 300 students from every tribe in Montana as well as the Bannock, Colville, Kalispel, Paiute, and Shoshone tribes of neighboring Idaho, Washington, and Wyoming. Most students had a white father and Native American mother, and another many were there voluntarily a large number had been forcibly taken from their parents by government agents and forced to attend the "white" school against their wishes. (Note: Campbell noted in 1901 that only 17 percent of Fort Shaw's students had parents who were both full-blood Native Americans.) Senator Paris Gibson visited the school in 1901, at which time it had 30 administrators and teachers and 316 students. A girls' basketball team was organized at Fort Shaw School in 1902. Campbell became the girls' basketball coach. The girls' team began interscholastic play in November 1902 (defeating Butte Parochial High School), and on January 15, 1903, played the very first basketball game (men's or women's) in nearby Great Falls, Montana. (Fort Shaw lost to Butte Parochial, 15-to-6.) In 1903, the team twice defeated the women's basketball team from Montana Agricultural College, once in Great Falls (36-to-9) and again in Bozeman (20-to-0). The Fort Shaw girls defeated nearly every high school and college girls' basketball team in the state, as well as several high school boys' teams. The team ended its first year as undisputed (if unofficial) state champion. It was unable to reproduce that record in the 1903–04 season, as the team could not secure appointments for games with any other high school in the state that year.

In 1904, school superintendent Fred Campbell agreed to send his girls' basketball team to the Louisiana Purchase Exposition (better known as the St. Louis World's Fair) in St. Louis, Missouri. To fund their trip, the team stopped at numerous points along the way to play exhibition games against other high school and college girls' teams. After each game, the girls donned traditional native ceremonial garb and charged a fee (50 cents) for a program of dance, music, and recitations. Part of the United States' pavilion at the world's fair was a Model Indian School. The girls would live and take classes at the school, and twice a week would hold intra-squad exhibitions. The girls also agreed to take on all challengers. The girls departed from Fort Shaw on June 1, 1904. The 11 girls defeated every single team they played over the next five months, earning themselves the title "world champions". (Note: The members of the team were: Lizzie Wirth (Assinniboine); Nettie Wirth (Assinniboine); Sarah Mitchell (Assinniboine/Chippewa); Belle Johnson (Piegan Blackfeet); Genevieve Butch (Assinniboine); Minnie Burton (Lemhi Shoshone); Genevieve Healy (A'aninin); Katie Snell (Assinniboine); Emma Rose Sansaver (Métis/Chippewa-Cree); Flora Lucero (Chippewa/Cree); Rose LaRose (Shoshone/Bannock))

The Fort Shaw Indian school closed in 1910 due to low attendance.

=== Ownership by the town of Fort Shaw ===
After its closure as an Indian school, Fort Shaw was turned over to the Fort Shaw Public School District, and the buildings were used as a public school.

The name Fort Shaw was revived when it became the name of a station and later a small town on the Vaughn-Augusta branch line of the Great Northern Railroad and some distance from the fort remnants. Today there are some buildings from the old days of the fort and one serves as a historical museum that's only open during the summer.

Today, most of the existing buildings and grounds of Fort Shaw, with the exception of the school and playground are under a long-term lease by the Sun River Valley Historical Society.

== Commanding officers ==
The commanding officers at Fort Shaw changed over time. Not all officers were present even when assigned to the fort, as they often traveled with their troops or moved among the various forts, camps, and settlements under their jurisdiction.

1867–1870 — 13th Infantry Regiment

- General Phillipe Régis de Trobriand
- Colonel Isaac Van Duzen Reeve
- Lieutenant Colonel G. L. Andrews (post commandant)
- Major William Clinton

1870–1878 — 7th Infantry Regiment

- Colonel John Gibbon

1878–1888 — 3rd U.S. Infantry Regiment

- Colonel John R. Brooke
- Lieutenant Colonel George Gibsin

1888–1891 — 25th Infantry Regiment

- Lieutenant Colonel James J. Van Horn
- Lieutenant Colonel George Leonard Andrews (commanding from Fort Missoula)

== Fort Shaw historic site ==
In 1936, the state of Montana erected a historic marker at the site of Fort Shaw. The marker consists of a 5 by 6 feet (1.5 by 1.8 m) redwood board on which is text describing Fort Shaw and some of its history. The sign hangs on short chains from a redwood crossbar which itself is mortar-joined and bolted to upright redwood posts. The posts are set in a stone and mortar based about 2 feet (0.61 m) high. The painted sign was replaced with one in which the text was routed and painted white in the 1940s. It is one of the original historic highway markers erected by the state, and is one in the best condition as of 2008.

The National Park Service considered adding Fort Shaw to its system after proposals by the Sons and Daughters of Montana Pioneers in 1936 and 1938. However, after conducting a study, officials determined the site was "not of national significance." Fort Shaw is part of the Fort Shaw Historic District and Cemetery, which was added to the National Register of Historic Places on January 11, 1985. A portion of the fort remains standing as of 2009.

== Bibliography ==
- Angevine, Robert G. (2004). The Railroad and the State: War, Politics, and Technology in Nineteenth-Century America. Stanford, Calif.: Stanford University Press. ISBN 0804742391.
- Axelrod, Alan (2008). Profiles in Folly: History's Worst Decisions and Why They Went Wrong. New york: Sterling Publishing Company. ISBN 9781402747687.
- Billings, John S.; Mackall, Louis (1870). A Report on Barracks and Hospitals, With Descriptions of Military Posts. Washington, D.C.: Government Printing Office.
- Bradley, James H. (1896). "Lieutenant James H. Bradley's Journal of the Campaign Against the Hostile Sioux in 1876 Under the Command of General John Gibbon". Contributions to the Historical Society of Montana. II. Historical Society of Montana: 140–228.
- Bureau of Indian Affairs (1902). Annual Report of the Commissioner of Indian Affairs to the Secretary of the Interior. Washington, D.C.: U.S. Government Printing Office.
- Campbell, Frederick C. (1899). "Reports of Superintendents of Bonded Schools". Annual Reports of the Department of the Interior for the Fiscal Year Ended June 30, 1899. Indian Affairs, Part 1. Washington, D.C.: U.S. Government Printing Office.
- Federal Writers' Project (1949). Montana: A State Guide Book. New York: Hastings House. ISBN 9780403021765.
- Fifer, Barbara C. (2005). Montana Battlefields, 1806–1877: Native Americans and the U.S. Army at War. Helena, Mont.: Farcountry Press. ISBN 9781560373094.
- Fifer, Barbara C. (2008). Bad Boys of the Black Hills: And Some Wild Women, Too. Helena, Mont.: Farcountry Press. ISBN 9781560374350.
- Fletcher, Robert H.; Bradshaw, Glenda Clay; Axline, Jon; Shope, Irvin (2008). Montana's Historical Highway Markers. Helena, Mont.: Montana Historical Society Press. ISBN 9780972152235.
- Frazer, Robert W. (1965). Forts of the West: Military Forts and Presidios, and Posts Commonly Called Forts, West of the Mississippi River to 1898. Norman, Okla.: University of Oklahoma Press. ISBN 0806112506.
- Gray, John S. (1991). Custer's Last Campaign: Mitch Boyer and the Little Bighorn Reconstructed. Lincoln, Neb.: University of Nebraska Press. ISBN 080322138X.
- Harrod, Howard L. (1971). Mission Among the Blackfeet. Norman, Okla.: University of Oklahoma Press. ISBN 0806109661.
- Hungry Wolf, Adolf (2006). The Blackfoot Papers. Skookumchuck, British Columbia: Good Medicine Cultural Foundation. ISBN 9780920698808.
- Koschman, A.M.; Bergendahl, M.H. (1968). Principal Gold-Producing Districts of the United States (Professional Paper 610). Washington, D.C.: United States Geological Survey.
- Leeson, Michael A. (1885). History of Montana, 1739–1885. Chicago: Warner, Beers & Co.
- Long, Wallace J. (1983). The Military History of Fort Missoula. Friends of the Historical Museum at Fort Missoula.
- Malone, Michael P.; Roeder, Richard B.; Lang, William L. (1991). Montana: A History of Two Centuries. Seattle: University of Washington Press. ISBN 0295971207.
- Miller, David; Smith, Dennis; McGeshick, Joseph R.; Shanley, James; Shields, Caleb (2008). The History of the Fort Peck Assiniboine and Sioux Tribes, 1800–2000. Helena, MT: Montana Historical Society Press. ISBN 9780975919651.
- Peavy, Linda; Smith, Ursula (2005). "World Champions: The 1904 Girls' Basketball Team From Fort Shaw Indian Boarding School". In King, C. Richard (ed.). Native Athletes in Sport and Society: A Reader. Lincoln, Neb.: University of Nebraska Press. ISBN 9780803227538.
- Philbrick, Nathaniel (2010). The Last Stand: Custer, Sitting Bull, and the Battle of the Little Bighorn. New York: Viking. ISBN 9780670021727.
- Robison, Ken (2011). Cascade County and Great Falls. Charleston, S.C.: Arcadia Publishing. ISBN 9780738581927.
- Robison, Ken (2013). Montana Territory and the Civil War: A Frontier Forged on the Battlefield. Charleston, S.C.: The History Press. ISBN 9781626191754.
- Rockwell, Ronald V. (2009). The U.S. Army in Frontier Montana. Helena, Mont.: Sweetgrass Books. ISBN 9781591520658.
- Rodenbough, Theophilus F.; Haskin, William L., eds. (1896). The Army of the United States: Historical Sketches of Staff and Line With Portraits of Generals-in-Chief. New York: Maynard, Merrill.
- Sherris, Arieh (Ari); Pete, Tachini; Thompson, Lynn E.; Haynes, Erin Lynn (2013). "Task-Based Language Teaching Practices That Support Salish Language Revitalization". In Jones, Mari C.; Jones, Sarah Ogilvie (eds.). Keeping Languages Alive: Documentation, Pedagogy and Revitalization. Cambridge, UK: Cambridge University Press. ISBN 9781107029064.
