= Fort Shaw, Montana =

- CDP
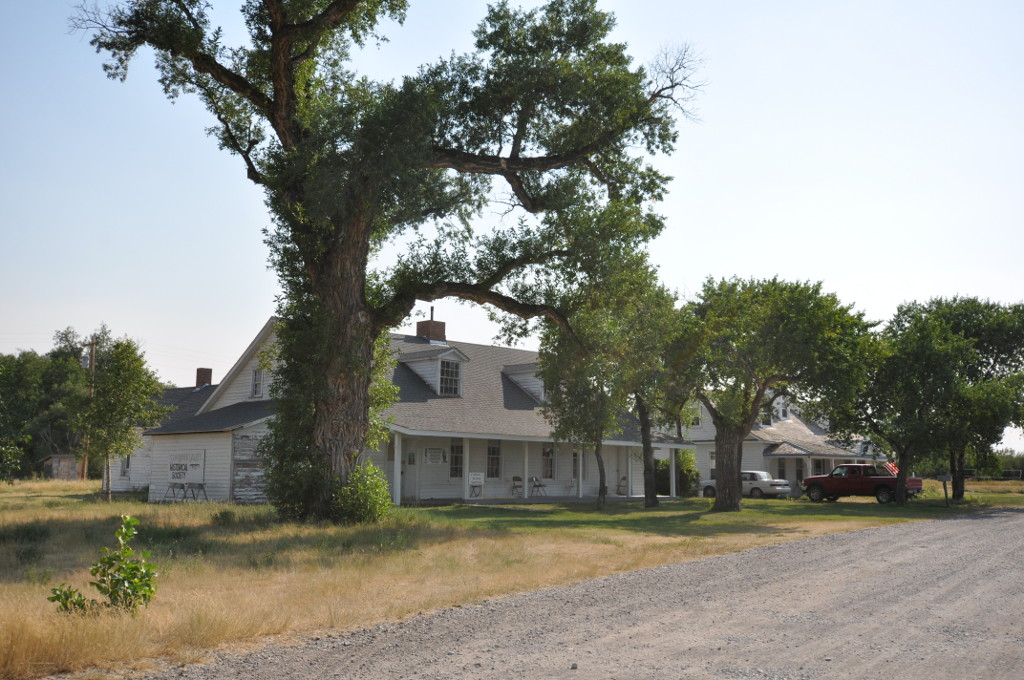

- Location of Fort Shaw, Montana
- Coordinates: 47°30′12″N 111°49′08″W
- Country: United States
- State: Montana
- County: Cascade

Area
  - Total: 5.68 sq mi (14.71 km^{2})
  - Land: 5.68 sq mi (14.71 km^{2})
  - Water: 0 sq mi (0.00 km^{2})
- Elevation: 3,527 ft (1,075 m)

Population (2020)
  - Total: 256
  - Density: 45/sq mi (17.4/km^{2})
- Time zone: UTC-7 (Mountain (MST))
  - Summer (DST): UTC-6 (MDT)
- ZIP code: 59443
- Area code: 406
- FIPS code: 30-28600
- GNIS feature ID: 2408243

Fort Shaw is a census-designated place (CDP) in Cascade County, Montana, United States. The population was 256 at the 2020 census, a decrease from 280 at the 2010 census. Named for a former United States military outpost, it is part of the Great Falls, Montana Metropolitan Statistical Area.

First called Camp Reynolds, Fort Shaw is named for Col. Robert G. Shaw of Boston, the first white officer to lead a unit of the United States Colored Troops in the American Civil War. The U.S. government established this fort on the Mullan Road in 1867. A community developed around it. The fort was decommissioned in 1891 and repurposed as an Indian boarding school.

The Fort Shaw Indian girls' basketball team won every game but one from 1902 to 1906. They played in exhibition matches at the 1904 Louisiana Purchase Exposition and earned the title of "World champions".

In 1906 the U.S. Reclamation Service laid out the townsite about 1 mile south of the old fort. The Fort Shaw Historic District and Cemetery is part of the National Register of Historic Places. Portions of the fort that survived are now part of a museum and the historical society offers tours.

== Geography ==
Fort Shaw is located on Montana Highway 200. The Sun River flows north of town. It is in an area known as the Sun River Valley.

According to the United States Census Bureau, the CDP has a total area of 5.6 square miles (15 km^{2}), all land.

== Demographics ==
Historical population
Census	Pop.	Note	%±
2020	256		—
U.S. Decennial Census

As of the census of 2000, there were 274 people, 101 households, and 73 families residing in the CDP. The population density was 48.6 inhabitants per square mile (18.8/km^{2}). There were 115 housing units at an average density of 20.4 per square mile (7.9/km^{2}). The racial makeup of the CDP was 97.81% White, 0.73% Native American, and 1.46% from two or more races. Hispanic or Latino of any race were 1.46% of the population.

There were 101 households, out of which 34.7% had children under the age of 18 living with them, 59.4% were married couples living together, 7.9% had a female householder with no husband present, and 27.7% were non-families. 25.7% of all households were made up of individuals, and 12.9% had someone living alone who was 65 years of age or older. The average household size was 2.70 and the average family size was 3.32.

In the CDP, the population was spread out, with 29.6% under the age of 18, 6.2% from 18 to 24, 25.9% from 25 to 44, 25.5% from 45 to 64, and 12.8% who were 65 years of age or older. The median age was 38 years. For every 100 females, there were 101.5 males. For every 100 females age 18 and over, there were 105.3 males.

The median income for a household in the CDP was $36,250, and the median income for a family was $45,357. Males had a median income of $34,688 versus $16,250 for females. The per capita income for the CDP was $17,381. About 7.4% of families and 9.3% of the population were below the poverty line, including 14.5% of those under the age of eighteen and 6.3% of those 65 or over.

== Education ==
Fort Shaw is part of the Sun River Valley School District. Fort Shaw Elementary School is located in town. Sun River Middle School and Simms High School are located in Simms.

== Infrastructure ==
The nearest airport is Great Falls International Airport.
