= St. Peter's Mission Church and Cemetery =

Historic site in Cascade County, Montana

Coordinates: 47°18′02″N 111°55′14″W

- U.S. National Register of Historic Places
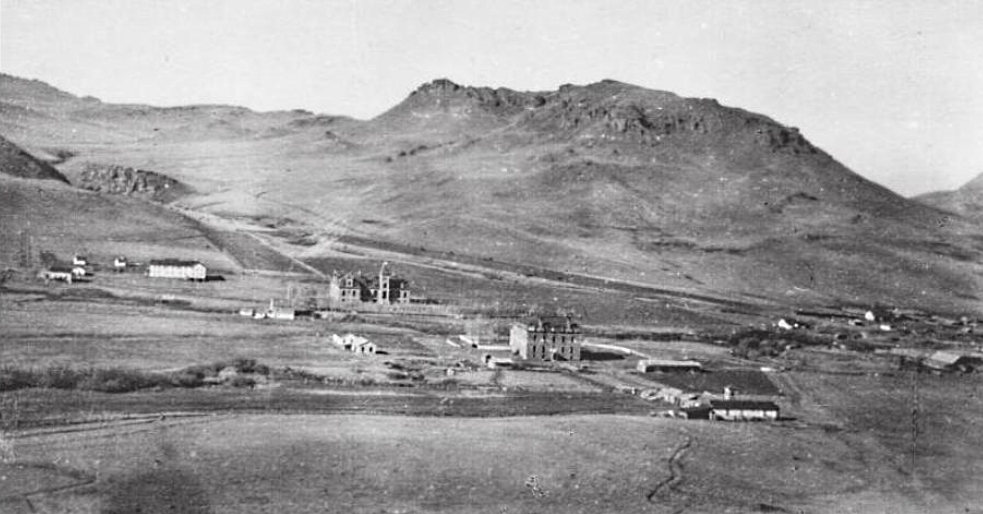
- St. Peter's Mission (prior to 1908)
- Location: On Birch Creek, 10.5 miles (16.9 km) west-northwest of Cascade, Montana
- Built: 1874
- Architectural style: Vernacular, Queen Anne, Second Empire
- NRHP reference No.: 84002452
- Added to NRHP: August 3, 1984

The St. Peter's Mission Church and Cemetery, also known as St. Peter's Mission and as St. Peter's-By-the-Rock is a historic Roman Catholic mission located on Mission Road 10.5 miles (16.9 km) west-northwest of the town of Cascade, Montana, United States. The historic site consists of a wooden church and "opera house" and a cemetery. Also on the site are the ruins of a stone parochial school for boys, a stone convent, and several outbuildings.

St. Peter's Mission was founded in the 1860s by priests of the Society of Jesus (better known as the Jesuits), a Catholic religious order. It moved to its final location on Birch Creek in 1881. Within a year the Jesuits constructed a small chapel, a chapel expansion, and log cabin residences. The log cabins were subsequently moved, and a one-story wooden dormitory and three-story wooden bell tower were built adjacent to the chapel. Ursuline nuns arrived in October 1884 and opened a girls' school in 1885. A post office opened at the mission the same year, and farming and cattle ranching began at the site. A four-story stone school/dormitory for boys and a three-story wooden priests' residence were constructed in 1887. A four-story convent and girls' school was finished in 1892, and a two-story wooden music building (the "opera house") in 1896.

Changes in federal funding for Native American parochial schools led the Jesuits to abandon St. Peter's Mission in 1898, but the Ursulines continued their educational efforts there. The boys' school, priests' residence, one-story chapel addition, and some outbuildings burned to the ground in January 1908. The Ursulines closed the boys' school and refocused their educational efforts at the nearby town of Great Falls, Montana. Education for girls continued at St. Peter's until November 1918, when the girls' school burned to the ground. The mission was abandoned, and the post office closed in 1938.

== Early missions ==
The first mission established in 1841 by the Jesuits in what would become Montana was St. Mary's Mission. The town of Stevensville grew around this site. In 1845, the Jesuits established St. Ignatius Mission, which would later evolve into the town of St. Ignatius.

In April 1859, Father Adrian Hoecken and Brother Vincent Magri established a mission at Priest Butte on the Teton River, on a site just southeast of the current town of Choteau, Montana. They built three log cabins, and were soon joined by Father Camillus Imoda. The Jesuits abandoned this site in March 1860.

The Jesuits moved their mission to the Sun River, about 8 miles (13 km) upriver from Fort Shaw, near what is now Simms, Montana. They immediately began to build cabins, but abandoned the site in August when agriculture in the area proved too difficult. Father Imoda returned in 1861, accompanied by Brother Francis DeKock. They spent the year ministering in Fort Benton, and in 1862 were joined by Father Joseph Menetrey and Brother Lucian Agostino. They moved the mission 2 miles (3.2 km) downstream, naming this mission St. Peter's, after the Apostle Peter. They built seven log cabins and some corrals. Imoda, Menetrey, Agostino, and DeKock settled at the new mission, joined by Father Joseph Giorda. But this location also proved difficult for agriculture, and the local Piegan Blackfeet were hostile. Three men were killed by the Piegans in early 1866. When a local herder, John Fitzgerald, was killed by the Blackfeet within sight of the mission on April 6, the Jesuits decided to move again. Joined by Father L. B. Palladino, J. H. Vail from the Sun River Agency (an Indian agency located near the present town of Sun River, Montana), and a Blackfeet guide, Fathers Imoda and Giorda began scouting a new site.

In April 1866, the Jesuits abandoned the 1862 site and moved to a location 2 miles (3.2 km) south of Bird Tail Rock (15 miles (24 km) south of the modern town of Simms, Montana). The mission closed almost immediately due to hostility from the Piegan Blackfeet.

Two factors caused St. Peter's Mission to reopen in 1874. First, the Roman Catholic Church in the United States established a Bureau of Catholic Indian Missions to coordinate, expand, and make more effective missionary work among the Native American tribes in the west. Second, the U.S. federal government moved the border of the Piegan Blackfeet reservation about 60 miles (97 km) northward. Although this deprived St. Peter's Mission of most of its Blackfeet students, it also made the mission much safer. St. Peter's Mission primarily enrolled Métis students for the next several years thereafter. Father Philip Rappagliosi joined St. Peter's Mission in mid-1875. By 1877, the mission consisted of two one-room log cabins, one of which functioned as a church. The small size of the establishment was not unusual, since St. Peter's Mission served only as a base of operations for the priests, most of whom traveled with nomadic bands of Blackfeet throughout the summer. Father Joseph Guidi joined the mission in 1875.

== Early history ==
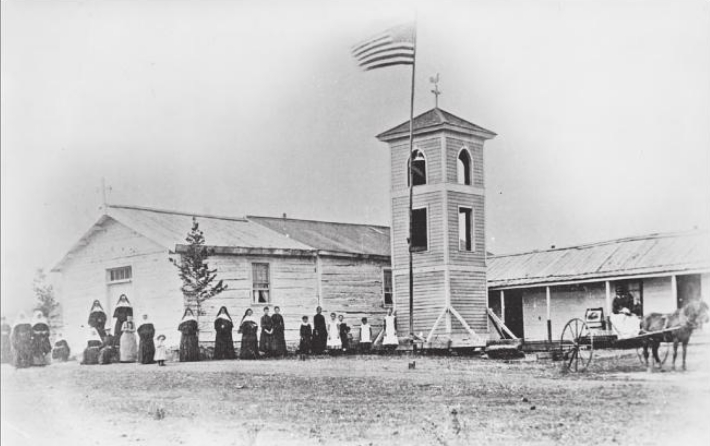
St. Peter's Mission in 1884, after construction of quarters for the Uruslines. "Stagecoach" Mary Fields is sitting in the wagon at right.

=== Early buildings ===
With the relocation of the border of the Blackfeet Indian Reservation as the federal government forced the tribe to give up more and more land, the Jesuits decided to move their mission again to remain close to the tribe they were proselytizing. The mission moved in 1881 to its final location on Birch Creek, at a point 10.5 miles (16.9 km) west-northwest of Cascade, Montana.

The first buildings at St. Peter's Mission were spartan. With assistance from some of the Métis and, occasionally, soldiers from nearby Fort Shaw, the priests built a one-story rectangular chapel out of logs, which were stripped of bark and roughly squared off by hand. For a time the chapel doubled as sleeping quarters for the priests. A second square-log building attached to the chapel was quickly constructed to serve as sleeping quarters and kitchen. This structure doubled the mission's size. By the end of 1881, the priests had constructed several small log cabins to serve as individual priestly residences. They attached these to the west end of the expanded chapel, creating an L-shaped structure.

St. Peter's Mission continued to expand in 1882. The log cabins were separated from the chapel and moved south of it, and a one-story clapboard dormitory for priests and male students was built in their place. A three-story clapboard bell tower was built where the chapel and dormitory met.

=== Early operations ===
In the 1880s, a shortage of Roman Catholic priests in Montana led the priests of St. Peter's Mission to travel widely throughout the area in the summer months to perform weddings, baptisms, and other ceremonies. Father Imoda planned from the beginning to expand the mission to include a day school or boarding school. To make it a success, he felt, it had to be run by nuns. Father Palladino described the intended curriculum as reading, spelling, and writing, with enough basic mathematics to allow for simple business transactions to be undertaken without being cheated. "Book learning" would be supplemented with industrial arts: Animal husbandry, farming, and ranching skills.

In 1883, Father Joseph Damiani offered Métis leader Louis Riel a teaching position at St. Peter's Mission. Riel, his wife Marguerite, and his son Jean-Louis were living with nomadic Métis. But with Marguerite pregnant with their second child, Riel decided to settle in one place to provide his children with more stability. In December 1883, Riel began teaching English, French, mathematics, and training in a variety of practical manual skills (wood carving, metal working, leather making, and so on) to 22 to 25 Métis boys.

The student body at St. Peter's Mission changed over time, however. A'aninin (known to whites by the mistranslated name "Gros Ventres") boarding students soon outnumbered the Métis day-students, and the Jesuits began to successfully encourage the Piegan Blackfeet to send their children to the school as boarding students as well.

== Arrival of the Ursulines and expansion ==
=== Bringing the Ursulines to St. Peter's ===
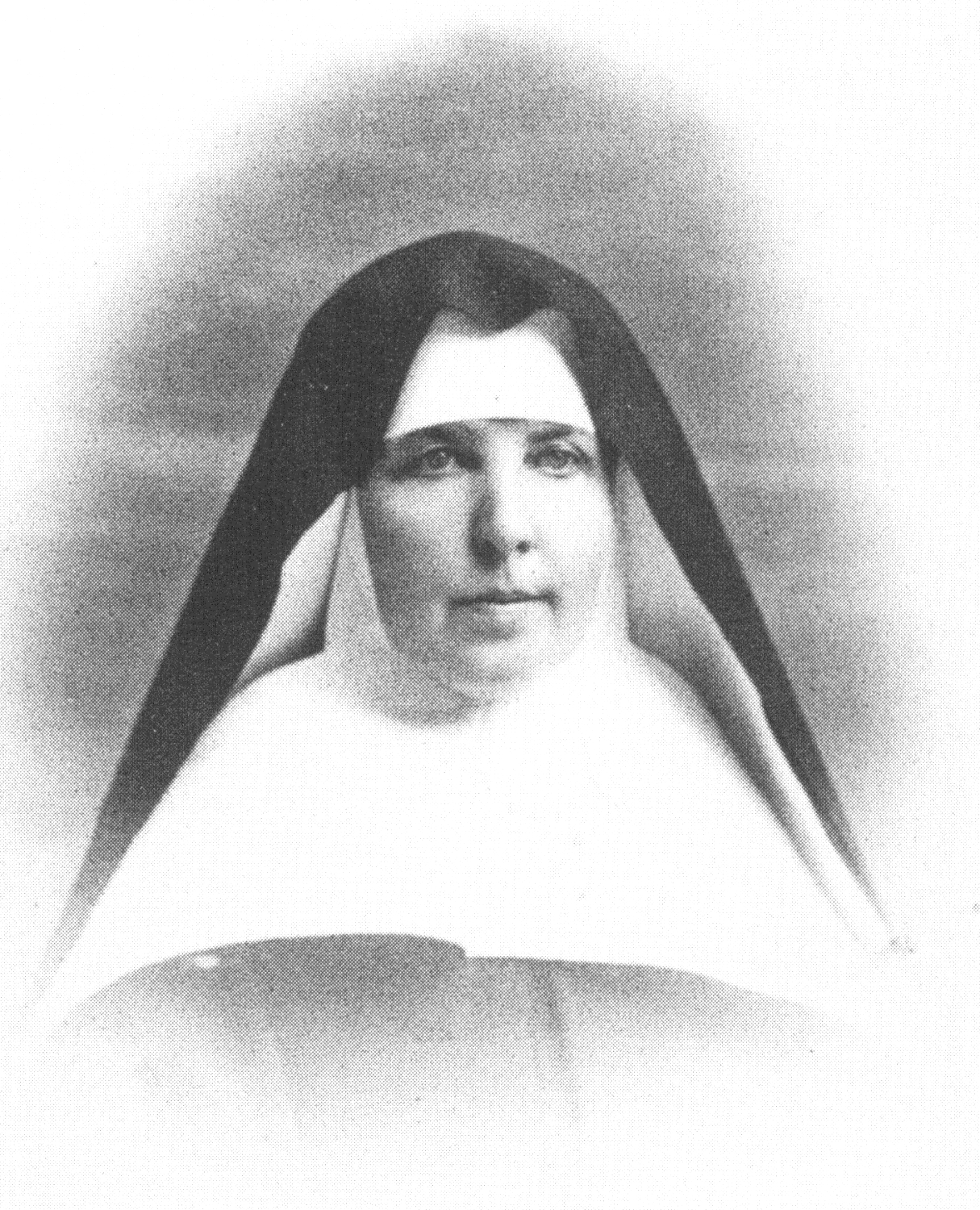
Mother Amadeus, photographed in early 1884.

Riel spent his time writing poetry and thinking about politics, in time concluding that he should work toward the establishment of a Métis republic in northwest Canada. On June 4, 1884, a delegation of Métis arrived at St. Peter's from Saskatchewan to ask Riel to return with them to assist in the Métis effort to secure treaty enforcement from the Canadian government. Riel agreed, and he and his family left St. Peter's on June 10, never to return.

Meanwhile, the new (and founding) Bishop of the Roman Catholic Diocese of Helena, Jean-Baptiste Brondel, invited the Ursuline religious order of women to join the Jesuits at St. Peter's Mission in January 1884. A sister in the Toledo chapter, Mother Mary Amadeus (Sarah Therese Dunne), (Note: Mother Amadeus entered the Ursuline convent in Toledo at age 18, and was 38 years old in 1884. Afflicted with arthritis and other health problems due to an accidental poisoning in childhood, she had never spent a single night outside the convent in 20 years.) led five Ursulines to St. Peter's in October. They quickly established a boarding school for girls (open to children of settlers and Native Americans). The Jesuits gave the nuns $200 in provisions, a farm, some cows, and some wagons to help them survive, and promised to pay them $200 a year to teach boys if more nuns could be brought to the mission. In 1885, the Jesuits began turning over the educational duties of St. Peter's Mission to the Ursulines, who opened St. Peter's Industrial School for Girls that year with 11 Blackfeet students.

Life for the Ursulines was not easy. Their housing was extremely primitive. In addition to their teaching duties, they also cooked, cleaned, sewed, did laundry, nursed the sick, and tried to generate money for their own activities by engaging in for-profit farming, ranching, poultry raising, egg farming, supplying rock, and timber cutting. In a letter to a colleague, Mother Amadeus expressed frustration with having to spend so much time taking care of the priests and with the Jesuit priests' refusal to fund-raise for the Ursulines while back east. Some Ursulines were unable to cope with the harsh life. In 1884, Sister St. Gertrude from the Brown County, Ohio, Ursulines joined St. Peter's. But she left in October 1885, "not able to bear the strain of missionary life", as Mother Amadeus said tactfully.

Illness affected the Ursulines, too. In April 1885, Mother Amadeus fell ill with pneumonia. As her condition worsened, word reached the Ursuline convent in Toledo. Mary Fields, an African American ex-slave who had formerly been employed by the Dunne family as a servant, worked at the convent. When Mother Stanislaus journeyed to Montana to nurse Mother Amadeus, Fields accompanied her. Amadeus recovered, and Fields decided to stay in Montana. For the next eight years, she helped the sisters with farming, constructing buildings, running the laundry, and driving the freight wagon to nearby Cascade. Known as "Stagecoach Mary," she cursed, smoked cigars, drank liquor, carried a loaded firearm, and fought anyone who gave her the slightest insult. In 1894 Bishop Brondel demanded that Fields leave the mission after she fought a duel in Helena with a man who insulted her. Estranged from the church by Brondel's decision, Fields moved to nearby Cascade. Mother Amadeus provided her with funds to open a restaurant. When the restaurant later failed, Mother Amadeus helped Fields win a job as a mail carrier.

The expansion of St. Peter's led to federal approval for a post office at the mission in 1885. After arriving in Montana, Mother Amadeus asked Bishop Brondel to give her control over the Ursulines, but he declined to do so. Amadeus repeatedly asked Mother Stanislaus, head of the Toledo chapterhouse (and who exercised authority over the Ursulines at St. Peter's), for more sisters to help with the work in Montana. Her requests were denied. She appealed to Richard Gilmour, Bishop of Cleveland, Ohio. When Mother Stanislaus complained, Mother Amadeus denied she was making an end-run around the chapterhouse, claiming instead that she was acting under instruction from Bishop Brondel. In February 1886, Bishop Gilmour ordered the Ursulines in Toledo to stop talking about how much they wished to teach in Montana, and ordered the St. Peter's Ursulines separated from the Toledo chapter.

=== Construction of the boys' school ===
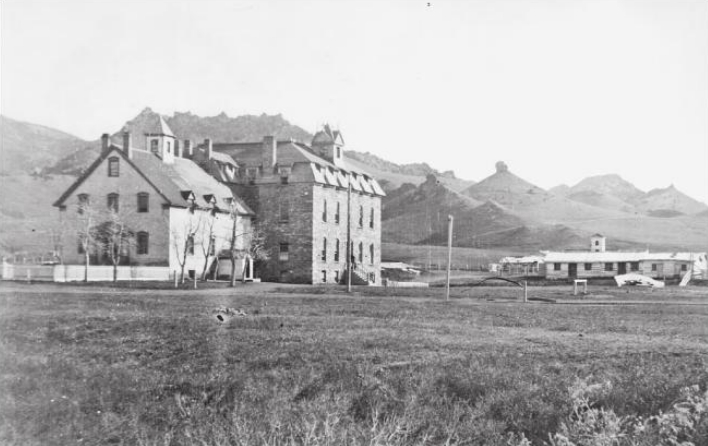
The 1887 buildings: The priests' residence (with picket fence) attached to the stone boys' school. In the background (right) is the original chapel, nuns' residence, and bell tower.

Federal funding for the Jesuit boys' school and private donations proved adequate to allow construction of two new buildings in 1887. The first was a boys' school. This four-story stone building featured a mansard roof, dormers, and square cupola above the front entrance. The building contained dormitory space, classrooms, smithy, cobbler shop, carpentry shop, and a dining room. A three-story wood frame priests' residence with centrally placed square cupola was attached to the boys' school on the south. A kitchen garden was planted west and south of these buildings.

Construction of the boys' school changed the way boys were educated at St. Peter's. Most instruction was now carried on indoors, in great contrast to the Native American way of life at the time (in which most time was spent outdoors). The boys were responsible for maintaining the kitchen garden, herding and feeding the small herd of beef cattle, and feeding and milking the dairy cattle, so some time each day was spent in the barns, corrals, or garden. Small fields, watered by irrigation ditches, were also maintained by the boys. The curriculum did not change throughout the year. Boys were expected to work in the fields even in winter, and the amount of time spent indoors did not vary (even during summer, when the growing season demanded that most of the day be spent outdoors).

The educational structure at St. Peter's changed in 1889, and this proved controversial. Most Jesuit missions in Montana were on Indian land, and it was common for white settlers in the area to pay tuition and have their children educated alongside Native Americans at Jesuit schools. The Jesuits believed this integrated educational system also prepared Native Americans for participation in white society. But as the borders of the Piegan Blackfeet territory shrank over time, St. Peter's Mission found itself standing on non-Indian ground. At the request of Bishop Brondel, Father Damiani made the highly controversial decision in 1889 to segregate the Native American children. Nonetheless, both whites and Native Americans credited the school with providing a clean, safe, warm place to live; three meals a day; and an excellent education. Piegan Blackfeet leaders later credited the mission with giving their tribe well-educated leadership other tribes lacked.

== Further expansion ==
=== Expansion of Ursuline presence ===
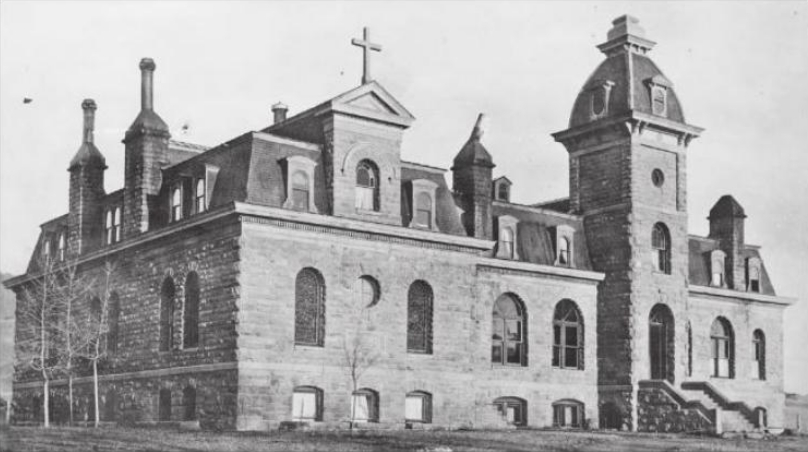
The Ursuline convent and girls' school, finished in 1896

Mother Amadeus was still agitating for additional independence. Although the Ursulines at St. Peter's won independence from the Toledo chapterhouse in 1886, the Ursulines were still subject to the authority of the priests and local bishop. Little support came from either source. Although the Ursuline mission in Montana had rapidly expanded, there were still too few nuns to do the work. In 1893, six Ursulines from Canada joined the St. Peter's mission on a temporary basis. Mother Amadeus tried to assert jurisdiction over them, claiming them as permanent residents. Angry, the six returned to Canada (even though Mother Amadeus refused to pay for their travel home). In 1898, convinced that mission work in Montana was ending, Mother Amadeus petitioned Bishop Brondel for permission to travel to Alaska to found new Ursuline convents, but he denied her request.

Since their arrival in Montana, the Ursulines had attempted to raise funds for the support of their missionary work at St. Peter's. These efforts bore fruit in 1888 when Philadelphia, Pennsylvania, heiress Katharine Drexel donated $5,000 to allow the nuns to build a convent and school. (Note: The mission's benefactress entered a convent in Pittsburgh in 1889 and in 2000 was canonized as Saint Katherine Drexel.) The three-story stone structure was built in a mixed Queen Anne and Second Empire architectural style. It featured a mansard roof, dormers, small towers capped with cupolas, and a centrally located four-story square domed tower over the entrance. The cornerstone for this building was laid on September 9, 1888, and it was occupied on January 1, 1892. The Ursulines called the new school Mount Angela Institute. In 1895, Drexel donated a small herd of cattle to the Ursulines at St. Peter's.

With the expansion of these facilities, the girls' education changed as well. In addition to religious instruction, the girls learned "modern" (that is, white) ways to cook, sew, and wash laundry. One of the old residential log cabins was turned into a bakery, and some girls learned how to bake with wheat flour and yeast. (Note: Native Americans in Montana did not grow wheat, and it was not naturally occurring. Plains Indians in Montana like Blackfeet harvested naturally growing Indian ricegrass, a gluten-free grass that (despite its name) is not related to rice. They often ground ricegrass into flour, and were not aware of yeast or other leavening agents. The A'aninin (Gros Ventres) traded with the Hidatsa of western North and South Dakota for corn, which could be ground into flour.) Unlike the boys, the girls spent all their time indoors.

The Ursulines also constructed an "opera house" in 1896. This L-shaped structure was 10 bays wide on its long edge, and the wing was three bays wide. The wood building contained an auditorium and stage for musical performances, and here the girls were taught dancing, embroidery, painting, wood carving, and how to play various musical instruments. The sisters also added a barn, corral, laundry, and workers' housing.

=== Departure of the Jesuits ===
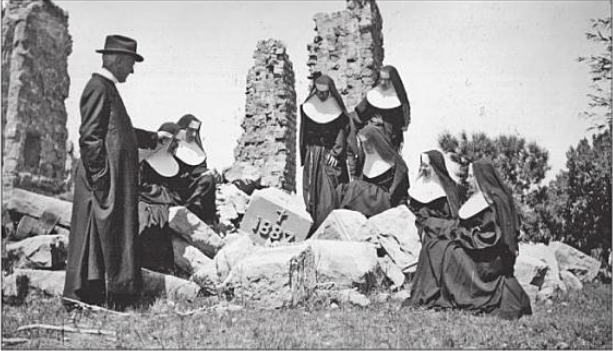
Remains of the boys' school and dormitory are surveyed in 1887 after the structure burned to the ground.

By 1895, the curriculum taught by the Jesuits and Ursulines was being questioned. Most Piegan Blackeet and A'aninin hated working indoors, no matter how well-constructed or decorated the schools and dormitories. Federal officials in charge of Indian education at the local level were aware of the Native Americans' hearty dislike of the schools, and by the mid-1890s most federal officials believed the indoor curriculum was inappropriate. (Indeed, by 1901, Commissioner of Indian Affairs William A. Jones announced the curriculum had failed.)

In 1896, the federal government began phasing out its financial support for parochial education for Native Americans. St. Peter's Mission was one of the first schools to lose its federal funding, even though it had more than 100 girls in classes and (just a short time earlier) 102 boys. With the loss of funding, the Jesuits and Ursulines concentrated their attention on Holy Family Mission. This mission, founded in the spring of 1886 by Father Damiani but not formally dedicated until October 25, 1890, was located on the Blackfeet reservation about 100 miles (160 km) north of St. Peter's. (For years, Holy Family was dependent on St. Peter's.)

The Ursulines took over the boys' educational program from the Jesuits. The refocusing of Jesuit energy on Holy Family Mission did not mean that the Jesuits abandoned St. Peter's Mission. It still acted as a base of operations and a residence until May 1898, when Father Damiani (Superior of St. Peter's since 1892) and the remaining three Jesuit priests announced they would abandon the mission. The diocesan clergy remained to care for the church and conduct Mass, while the Ursulines remained to oversee the educational function.

A major development in the international Ursuline organization in 1900 gave the St. Peter's nuns the independence of action they sought. For some years, a movement had existed to unify the hundreds of independent Ursuline chapterhouses into a single organization. A union would also give the Ursulines most of the independence they sought. Pope Leo XIII asked for Ursuline delegates to meet in Rome to consider creating an Ursuline Union. Mother Amadeus traveled to Rome to attend the meeting, in part because she advocated a union and in part because she believed she could win approval from the new organization for an expansion into Alaska. Mother Amadeus cast her eight convents' votes for the union, which was formed. (Note: Ursuline chapterhouses were not required to join the new Ursuline Union, but about half did so.) She won approval to go to Alaska from the Union's new Superior General, Mother St. Julien Aubrey. Additionally, the Ursuline Union divided the United States into two provinces and appointed Mother Amadeus provincial superior over the North Province.

== Leadership problems ==
In October 1902, Mother Amadeus traveled to Miles City, Montana, via train. Her east-bound train crashed head-on into a west-bound train. Her hip was broken, and Mother Amadeus spent nine weeks in a hospital in Helena. The primitive system of weights attached to her ankles (used as traction to keep the hip bones in place) did not work properly, and she walked with a severe limp and used a cane for the rest of her life.

Bishop Brondel died suddenly in 1903. His replacement, Bishop Mathias Lenihan, led the Roman Catholic Diocese of Great Falls, which was formed in 1904. Lenihan was intent on reining in what he saw as unruly nuns. In 1905, Mother Amadeus asked Bishop Lenihan for permission to take some nuns to Alaska to found a convent there. Lenihand refused to allow it. Mother Amadeus then found three Montana Ursulines not yet subject to Lenihan's authority, and escorted them to Seattle to see them off. During her long absence, Bishop Lenihan punished nuns at St. Peter's who supported Mother Amadeus, and encouraged those unhappy with her leadership to accuse her before Ursuline Union of fabricating majority support for the union's formation.

More positively, however, Mother St. Julien Aubrey, the Superior General of the Ursuline Union, visited St. Peter's Mission in June 1906.

== Fires and abandonment ==
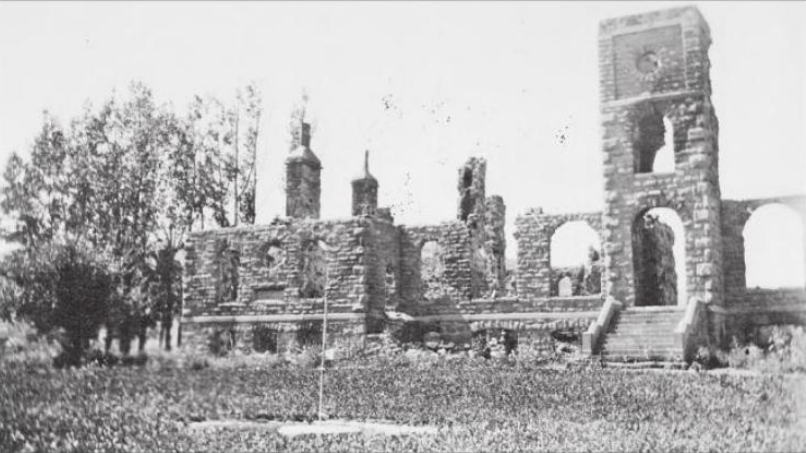
The stone Ursuline convent/girls' school building at St. Peter's Mission after the fire of 1918 that caused the mission's abandonment

In January 1908, the stone boys' school, the wooden priests' residence, the school for Native American girls (formerly the one-story nuns residence), and several outbuildings at St. Peter's Mission burned to the ground. Bishop Lenihan had asked the Ursulines to move their ministry to the nearby city of Great Falls, which was founded in 1883. The Ursulines decided to continue the mission at St. Peter's, but move the center of their activity to Great Falls. The Great Falls Townsite Company offered them any two city blocks. The Ursulines choose an area bordered by Central Avenue, 25th Street South, 2nd Avenue South, and 23rd Street South. The area was on a slight hill with a good view and relatively distant from the busy downtown commercial district.

Mother Amadeus left St. Peter's Mission in 1910, moving to Alaska, where she hoped to found a convent of Ursulines. She died there on November 10, 1919. The Ursulines buried her at St. Ignatius Mission.

St. Peter's Mission slowly fell into decay over the next eight years. After the Ursuline Academy in Great Falls opened in 1912, the white girls' school at St. Peter's closed.

At 2:30 A.M. on November 15, 1918, the stone convent/school burned to the ground. St. Peter's Mission was abandoned, and all Native American girls were transferred to other mission schools.

The St. Peter's post office closed in 1938.

== Location ==
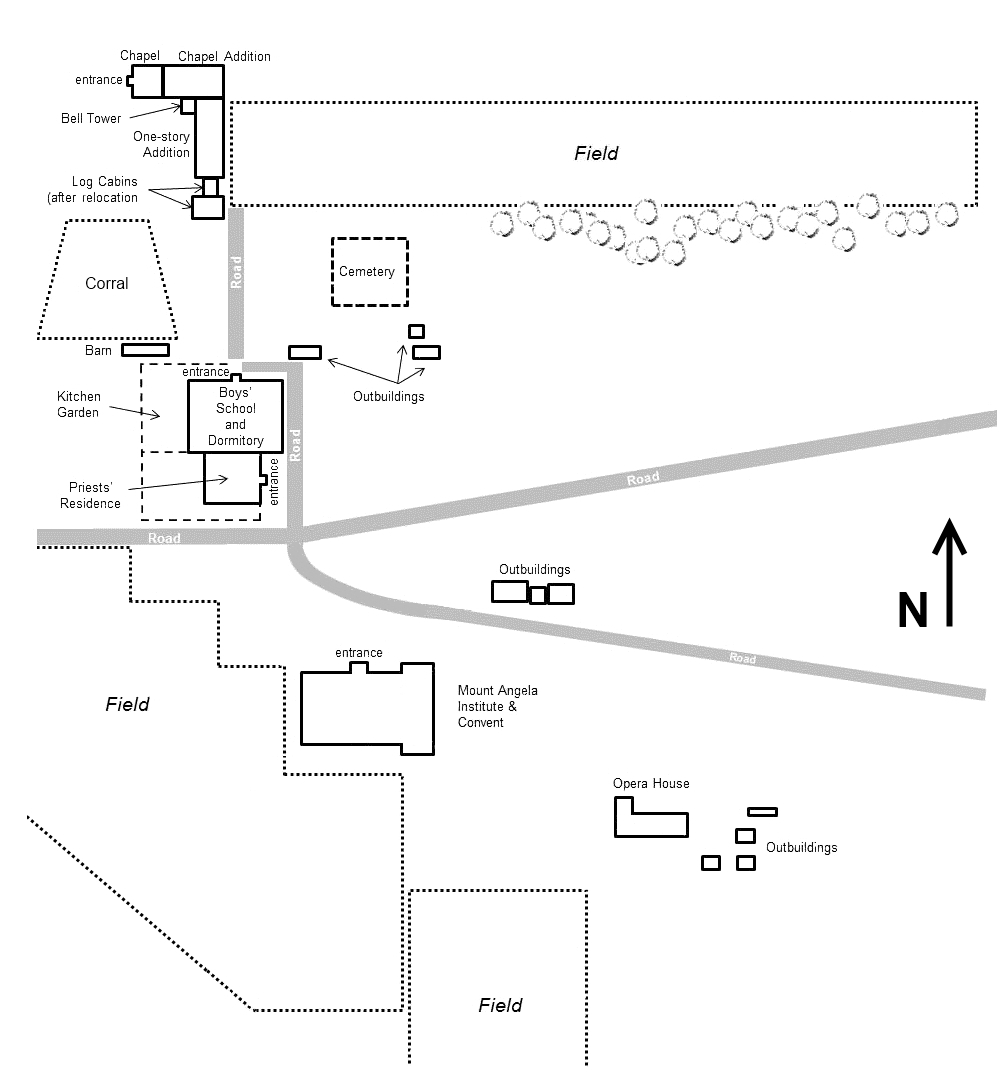
Map of St. Peter's Mission (not to scale) circa 1907.

To visit the St. Peter's Mission site, drive on Interstate 15 south from Great Falls, Montana. Leave the interstate highway at exit 256. The first intersection is with Mission Road (also known as the Simms-Cascade Road). Turn right (north) onto Mission Road/Simms-Cascade Road. Drive about 10 miles (16 km) on this gravel road. Mission Road diverges to the left. Drive another 8 miles (13 km) to St. Peter's Mission. (If you reach Trout Creek Road, you have driven too far.) A small sign by the side of the road marks the entrance gate to the site, and provides a limited history of St. Peter's Mission.

As of 2012, the mission site was on the Klinker Ranch, about 600 feet (180 m) south of the road. Visitors need to open and close two gates to reach the site. (Cattle graze in the area, so it is important to close the gate.) Roadside (shoulder) parking is available, but very limited.

Two buildings at St. Peter's Mission remain standing. The expanded chapel is in relatively good condition, and recently has been painted by the owners of the land on whose property it now stands. At some point in the past, a two-story bell tower was built in front of the chapel's entrance so that now visitors pass through the base of this non-historic bell tower to access the church. The red wooden "opera house" is still standing, although now it is used as a barn. A corral connects the opera house to an original log cabin, which is used for feed storage. A modern building has been constructed adjacent to this log cabin.

Most of what remains of St. Peter's Mission are the foundations of prior buildings, and many of these are crumbling or in serious disrepair. On the edge of a copse of trees are the remains of the boys' school and dormitory. A portion of some stone walls containing windows and doorways remains standing. A small, decrepit log cabin abuts these ruins.

The cemetery is behind and to the right of the chapel, uphill from the ruins of the mission. It was surrounded by a buck fence in 2011 to keep cattle away. Some of the graves in the cemetery are quite tall and others are enclosed by a small, ornate iron fence, but many lie flush in the ground or hidden among the high grass.

Visitors are advised to wear long pants and hiking boots in the area, due to the presence of prairie rattlesnakes.

== See also ==
- List of Jesuit sites

== Bibliography ==
- Aarstad, Rich; Arguimbau, Ellen; Baumler, Ellen; Porsild, Charlene L.; and Shovers, Brian. Montana Place Names: From Alzada to Zortman. Helena, Mont.: Montana Historical Society Press, 2009.
- Bryan, William L. Montana's Indians: Yesterday and Today. Helena, Mont.: American & World Geographic Pub., 1996.
- Butler, Anne M. Across God's Frontiers: Catholic Sisters in the American West, 1850–1920. Chapel Hill, N.C.: University of North Carolina Press, 2012.
- Capace, Nancy. Encyclopedia of Montana. Santa Barbara, Calif.: Somerset, 2000.
- Dries, Angelyn. "Amadeus, Mary." In Biographical Dictionary of Christian Missions. Gerald H. Anderson, ed. Grand Rapids, Mich.: Wm. B. Eerdmans Publishing, 1999.
- Dusenberry, Verne. The Montana Cree: A Study in Religious Persistence. Norman, Okla.: University of Oklahoma Press, 1998.
- Erickson, Cornelia Flaherty. Go With Haste Into the Mountains: A History of the Diocese of Helena. Helena, Mont.: Catholic Diocese of Helena, 1984.
- Federal Writers' Project. Montana: A State Guide Book. New York: Hastings House, 1949.
- Flintham, Lydia Sterling. "Leaves From the Annals of the Ursulines." Catholic World. December 1897, pp. 319–339.
- Fowler, Loretta. The Columbia Guide to American Indians of the Great Plains. New York: Columbia University Press, 2003.
- Harrod, Howard L. Mission Among the Blackfeet. Norman, Okla.: University of Oklahoma Press, 1971.
- Johansen, Bruce E. and Pritzker, Barry. Encyclopedia of American Indian History. Santa Barbara, Calif.: ABC-CLIO, 2008.
- Kohl, Martha. I Do: A Cultural History of Montana Weddings. Helena, Mont.: Montana Historical Society Press, 2011.
- Korn, Danna and Sarros, Connie. Gluten-Free Cooking for Dummies. Hoboken, N.J.: John Wiley & Sons, 2011.
- Mahoney, Irene. Lady Blackrobes: Missionaries in the Heart of Indian Country. Golden, Colo.: Fulcrum Publishing, 2006.
- McKevitt, Gerald. Italian Jesuits in the American West, 1848–1919. Stanford, Calif.: Stanford University Press, 2007.
- Palladino, Lawrence B. Indian and White in the Northwest; or, A History of Catholicity in Montana. Baltimore: J. Murphy & Co., 1894. Accessed 2013-12-26.
- Porter, Francis Xavier and Scott, Kristi D. Ursuline Sisters of Great Falls. Charleston, S.C.: Arcadia Publishing, 2012.
- Rappagliosi, Philip and Bigart, Robert. Letters From the Rocky Mountain Indian Missions. Lincoln, Neb.: University of Nebraska Press, 2003.
- Rockwell, Ronald V. The U.S. Army in Frontier Montana. Helena, Mont.: Sweetgrass Books, 2009.
- Schoenberg, Wilfred P. A Chronicle of the Catholic History of the Pacific Northwest, 1743–1960. Spokane, Wash.: Gonzaga Preparatory School, 1962.
- Schoenberg, Wilfred P. Jesuits in Montana, 1840–1960. Portland, Ore.: Oregon-Jesuit, 1960.
- Schoenberg, Wilfred P. "Historic St. Peter's Mission: Landmark of the Jesuits and the Ursulines Among the Blackfeet." Montana: Magazine of Western History. 11:1 (Winter 1967), pp. 68–85.
- Schrems, Suzanne. Uncommon Women, Unmarked Trails: The Courageous Journey of Catholic Missionary Sisters in Frontier Montana. Norman, Okla.: Horse Creek Publications, 2003.
- Shirley, Gayle C. More Than Petticoats: Remarkable Montana Women. 2nd ed. Guilford, Conn.: Globe Pequot, 1995.
- Small, Lawrence F. Religion in Montana: Pathways to the Present. Billings, Mont.: Rocky Mountain College, 1995.
- Vaughn, Robert. Then and Now, or, Thirty-Six Years in the Rockies. Helena, Mont.: Farcountry Press, 2001.
- Wagner, Tricia Martineau. African American Women of the Old West. Guilford, Conn.: TwoDot, 2007.
- Walter, Dave and Schneider, Bill. Montana Campfire Tales, 2nd: Fourteen Historical Narratives. Guilford, Conn.: Globe Pequot, 2011.
- West, Carroll Van. "Acculturation By Design: Architectural Determinism and The Montana Indian Reservations, 1870–1930." Great Plains Quarterly. 7:2 (Spring 1987), 91–102.
- Wooten, Dudley G. "A Noble Ursuline." Catholic World. August 1920, pp. 588–602.
