= Ebony Horsewomen, Inc. Equestrian and Therapeutic Center =

Mental health center in Hartford, Connecticut

Ebony Horsewomen, Inc. Equestrian and Therapeutic Center is an equine therapeutic mental health center in Hartford, Connecticut. Founded in 1984, Ebony Horsewomen, Inc. is the only African-American organization in the country doing intensive equine-assisted psychotherapeutic work with adults, families, military veterans, and children. Ebony Horsewomen, Inc. hosts comprehensive and interactive equine therapeutic training workshops for mental health professionals as well as equine youth programs such as the Junior Mounted Patrol Unit, through which mounted community ambassadors help patrol Hartford's historic Keney Park, and the Saturday Saddle Club, in partnership with the University of Connecticut 4-H Club.

== Organization history ==
Ebony Horsewomen, Inc. Equestrian and Therapeutic Center is a nationally recognized 501(c)(3) nonprofit equine therapeutic organization founded by CEO Patricia E. Kelly, a veteran of the United States Marines and long-time community leader who initially started the organization as an equestrian club for Black women equestrians. Patricia Kelly wanted to help improve the quality of life in her community, so Ebony Horsewomen soon became a full-service equine therapeutic center housing horses, small therapy animals, and agriculture. The organization was founded in 1984 and is located in Hartford's historic 693-acre Keney Park area in the North End. Ebony Horsewomen Equestrian and Therapeutic Center is nationally recognized and has won numerous awards for helping empower youth. Patricia Kelly is in the National Cowgirl Hall of Fame and Museum, an inductee in the National Multicultural Western Heritage Museum Hall of Fame, and a CNN Top 10 Hero who has made appearances on The Queen Latifah Show and The Dr. Oz Show to discuss the work Ebony Horsewomen does in their community.

== Programs ==
Ebony Horsewomen offers workshops for mental health professionals, equine-assisted psychotherapy for families, youth, first responders, and military veterans, therapeutic riding lessons, and equine youth programs. Participants in these programs have access to fully equipped horse stables, a cooking cottage, outdoor riding rings, and a heated indoor riding arena for year-round therapy and lessons. In addition, the facility is in close proximity to a variety of small farm animals, which creates a nurturing learning environment and enhances the overall experience.

== Mary Fields Horse & Heritage Museum ==
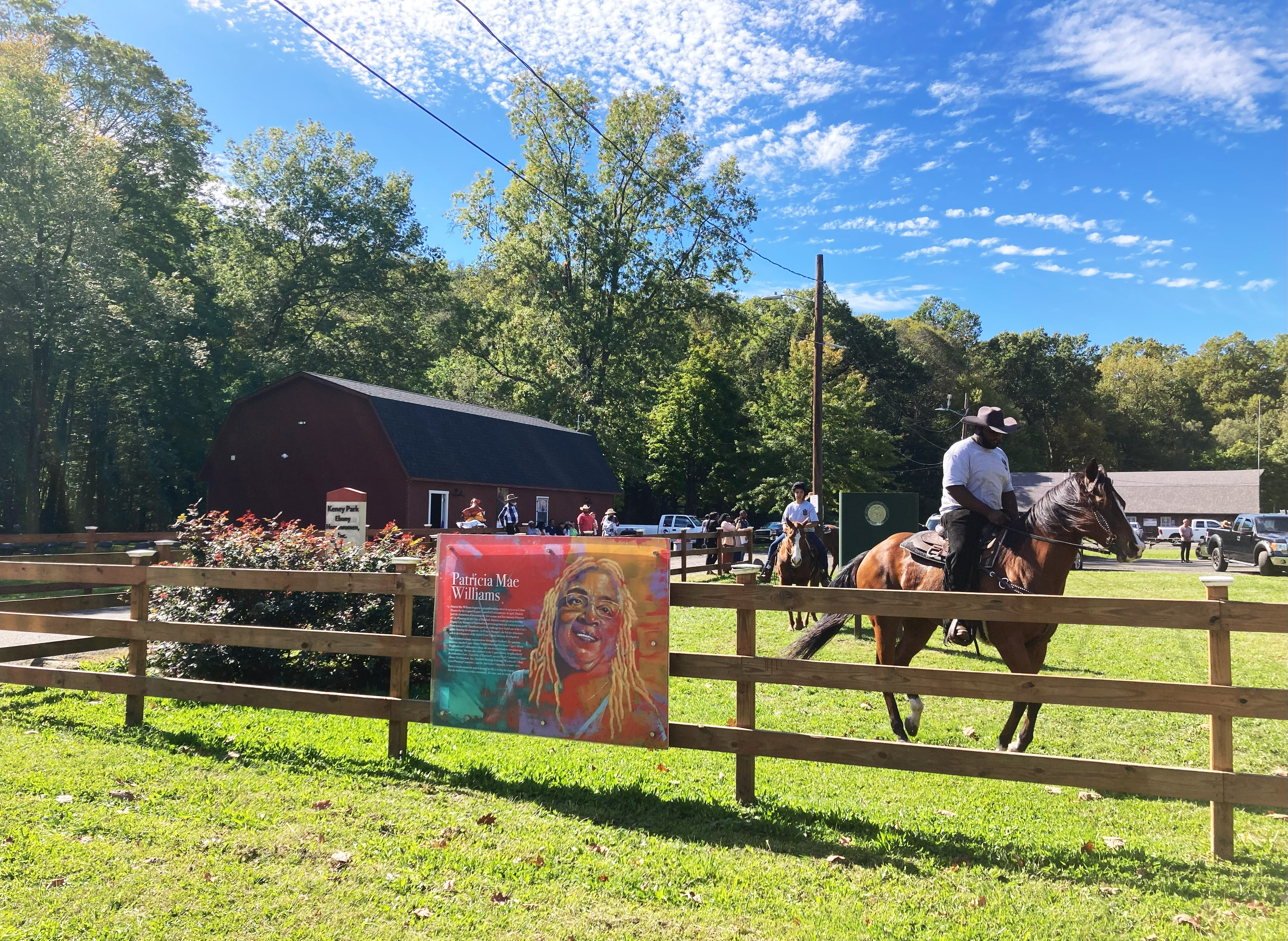
Horseback riders celebrate the grand opening of the Mary Fields Horse & Heritage Museum at Ebony Horsewomen's campus.

The Mary Fields Horse & Heritage Museum opened to the public in October 2025. Located on the Ebony Horsewomen campus, the museum honors the legacy of Black Cowboys and Indigenous horsemen and women. The museum is named for “Stagecoach Mary” Fields, a Black woman who worked as a mail carrier in Montana between 1895 and 1903.
