= Mary Fields =

American mail carrier (c. 1832 – 1914)

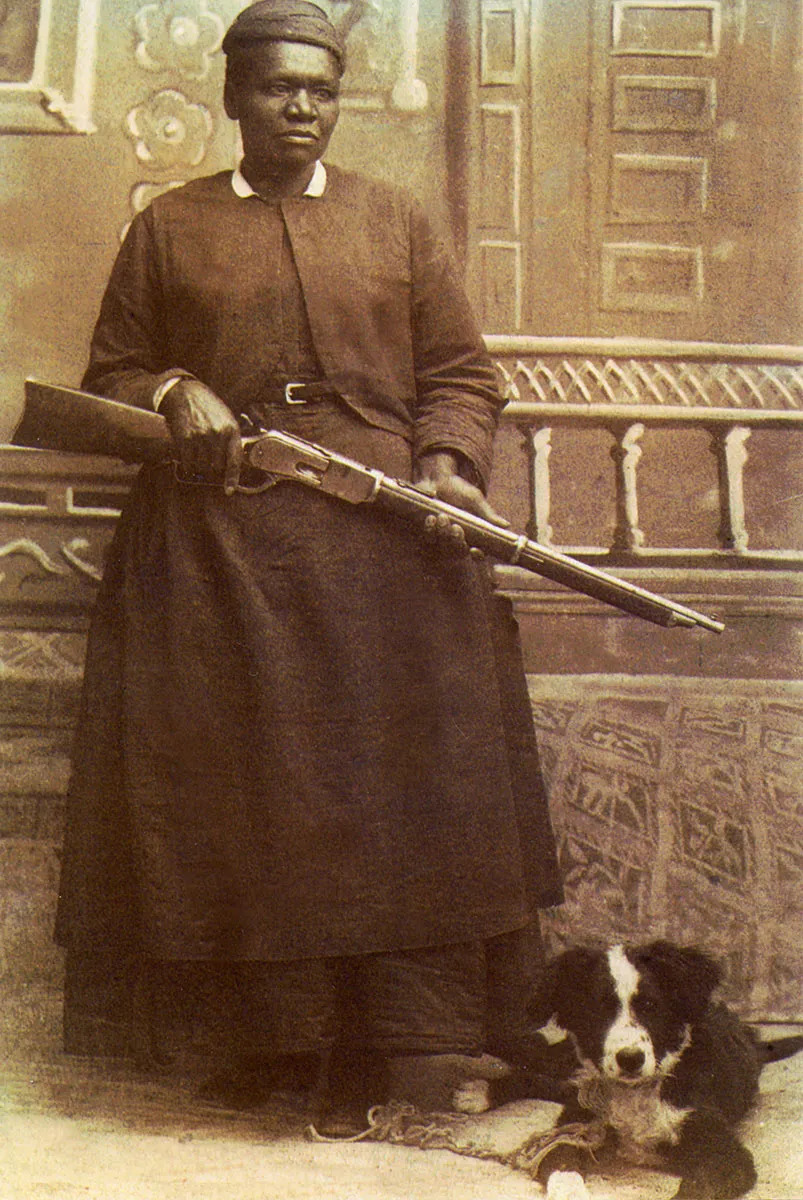
- Fields c. 1895
- Born: c. 1832; Hickman County, Tennessee, US
- Died: December 5, 1914 (aged 81–82); Great Falls, Montana, US
- Occupations: Freighter, cook, domestic worker, star route mail carrier
- Known for: First African-American woman star route mail carrier in the U.S.

Mary Fields (c. 1832 – December 5, 1914), also known as Stagecoach Mary and Black Mary, was an American mail carrier who was the first Black woman to be employed as a star route postwoman in the United States.

Fields had the star route contract for the delivery of U.S. mail from Cascade, Montana, to Saint Peter's Mission. She drove the route for two four-year contracts, from 1895 to 1899 and from 1899 to 1903. Author Miantae Metcalf McConnell provided documentation discovered during her research about Mary Fields to the United States Postal Service Archives Historian in 2006. This enabled the USPS to establish Mary Fields' contribution as the first African-American female star route mail carrier in the United States.

== Biography ==
=== Early life and career ===
Fields was born into slavery in Hickman County, Tennessee, c. 1832. After the American Civil War ended in 1865, she was emancipated and found work as a chambermaid on board the Robert E. Lee, a Mississippi River steamboat. There, she encountered Judge Edmund Dunne and ultimately worked in his household as a servant. After Dunne's wife died, he sent Fields and his late wife's five children to live with his sister Mother Mary Amadeus in Toledo, Ohio where she was Mother Superior of an Ursuline convent.

In 1884, Mother Amadeus was sent to Montana Territory to establish a school for Native American girls at St. Peter's Mission, west of Cascade. Learning that Amadeus was stricken with pneumonia, Fields hurried to Montana to nurse her back to health. Amadeus recovered, and Fields stayed at St. Peter's. Fields took on multiple roles regarded as "men's work" at the time such as maintenance, repairs, fetching supplies, laundry, gardening, hauling freight, growing vegetables, tending chickens, and repairing buildings, and eventually became the forewoman.

Native Americans called Fields "White Crow", because "she acts like a white person but has black skin". Life in a convent was placid, but Fields' hearty temperament and habitual profanity made the religious community uncomfortable. In 1894, after several complaints and an incident with a disgruntled male subordinate that involved gunplay, the bishop barred her from the convent. Fields moved to Cascade where she opened a tavern, but profits waned due to allowing the cash-poor to dine free. It closed due to bankruptcy about 10 months later.

=== Postal service ===
By 1895, at sixty years old, Fields secured a job as a Star Route Carrier which used a stagecoach to deliver mail in the unforgiving weather and rocky terrain of Montana, with the help of nearby Ursuline nuns, who relied on Mary for help at their mission. This made her the first African-American woman to work for the U.S. Postal Service. She carried multiple firearms, most notably a .38 Smith & Wesson under her apron to protect herself and the mail from wolves, thieves and bandits, driving the route with horses and a mule named Moses. She never missed a day, and her reliability earned her the nickname "Stagecoach Mary" due to her preferred mode of transportation. If the snow was too deep for her horses, Fields delivered the mail on snowshoes, carrying the sacks on her shoulders. In one instance, she stayed up all night to fight off a pack of wolves who had knocked over her vehicle. And another time she was forced to walk back and forth until morning to avoid dying of frostbite, as she had gotten stuck in a blizzard. Mary Fields was resilient and dedicated to her work as a mail carrier.

She was not an employee of the United States Post Office Department, which did not hire or employ mail carriers for star routes, but rather awarded star route contracts to persons who proposed the lowest qualified bids. These people, in accordance with the department's application process, posted bonds and sureties to substantiate their ability to finance the route. Once a contract was awarded, the contractor could then drive the route themselves, sublet the route, or hire an experienced driver. Some individuals obtained multiple star route contracts and conducted the operations as a business.

=== Children ===
In contrast with her outwardly rough appearance and her drinking, smoking, and gun-wielding habits, Fields loved children. Though she never had her own, children adored her and parents in her area often hired her to babysit. From her life as an enslaved woman in Tennessee, to her later years in Montana when she offered her babysitting services for $1.50 a day, Mary Fields spent much of her life with kids. Though at times her rough and tumble reputation got in the way of this passion, as parents knew her as a rowdy saloon goer, and did not want their children under her care.

=== Later life ===
She was a respected public figure in Cascade, and the town closed its schools to celebrate her birthday each year. When Montana passed a law forbidding women to enter saloons, the mayor of Cascade granted her an exemption. In 1903, at the age of 71, Fields retired from star route mail carrier service. The townspeople's adoration for Fields was evident when her home was rebuilt by volunteers after it caught fire in 1912. She continued to babysit many Cascade children and owned and operated a laundry service from her home.

=== Death ===
Fields died in 1914 at Columbus Hospital in Great Falls. She was buried outside of Cascade.

== Personal life ==
Fields was Catholic, though she preferred the company (and activities) of local men to the sisters and their religious trappings.

== Legacy and representations in popular culture ==
=== Films ===
- In the documentary South by Northwest, "Homesteaders" (1976), Fields is played by Esther Rolle.
- In the TV movie The Cherokee Kid (1996), Fields is played by Dawnn Lewis.
- In the TV movie Hannah's Law (2012), she is played by Kimberly Elise.
- In the short Western film, They Die By Dawn (2013), Fields is played by Erykah Badu.
- In the film The Harder They Fall (2021), she is played by Zazie Beetz.
- In the film Outlaw Posse (2024), she is played by Whoopi Goldberg.
- In the TV series Hell On Wheels (2011), she was played by Amber Chardee Robinson.

=== Print ===
- In 1959, actor and Montana native Gary Cooper wrote an article for EBONY in which he stated: "Born a slave somewhere in Tennessee, Mary lived to become one of the freest souls ever to draw a breath, or a .38."
- "Stagecoach" Mary Fields, a screenplay by Georgianne Landy-Kordis
- A biography for children, Fearless Mary: The True Adventures of Mary Fields, American Stagecoach Driver by Tami Charles
- Stagecoach Mary, a collection of supernatural tales in pulp-fiction style by Jess Nevins
- "The Life and Legend of Mary Fields", Source: Sunny Nash, Mother Amadeus and Stagecoach Mary True West Magazine, 1996, True West Publications, Cave Creek AZ.
- A biographical book, Mary Fields: The Story of Black Mary by James A. Franks. ISBN 0-9657173-4-8
- African American Women of the Old West by Tricia Martineau Wagner, Twodot, Helena, Montana.

=== Music ===
Fields is the subject of Michael Hearst's song "Stagecoach Mary", as part of his 2015 Extraordinary People project.

=== Television ===
In the TV AMC series, "Hell On Wheels" (2011–2016), Fields is played by Amber Chardae Robinson, featured in five episodes during 2015–2016, season five.

=== Museums ===
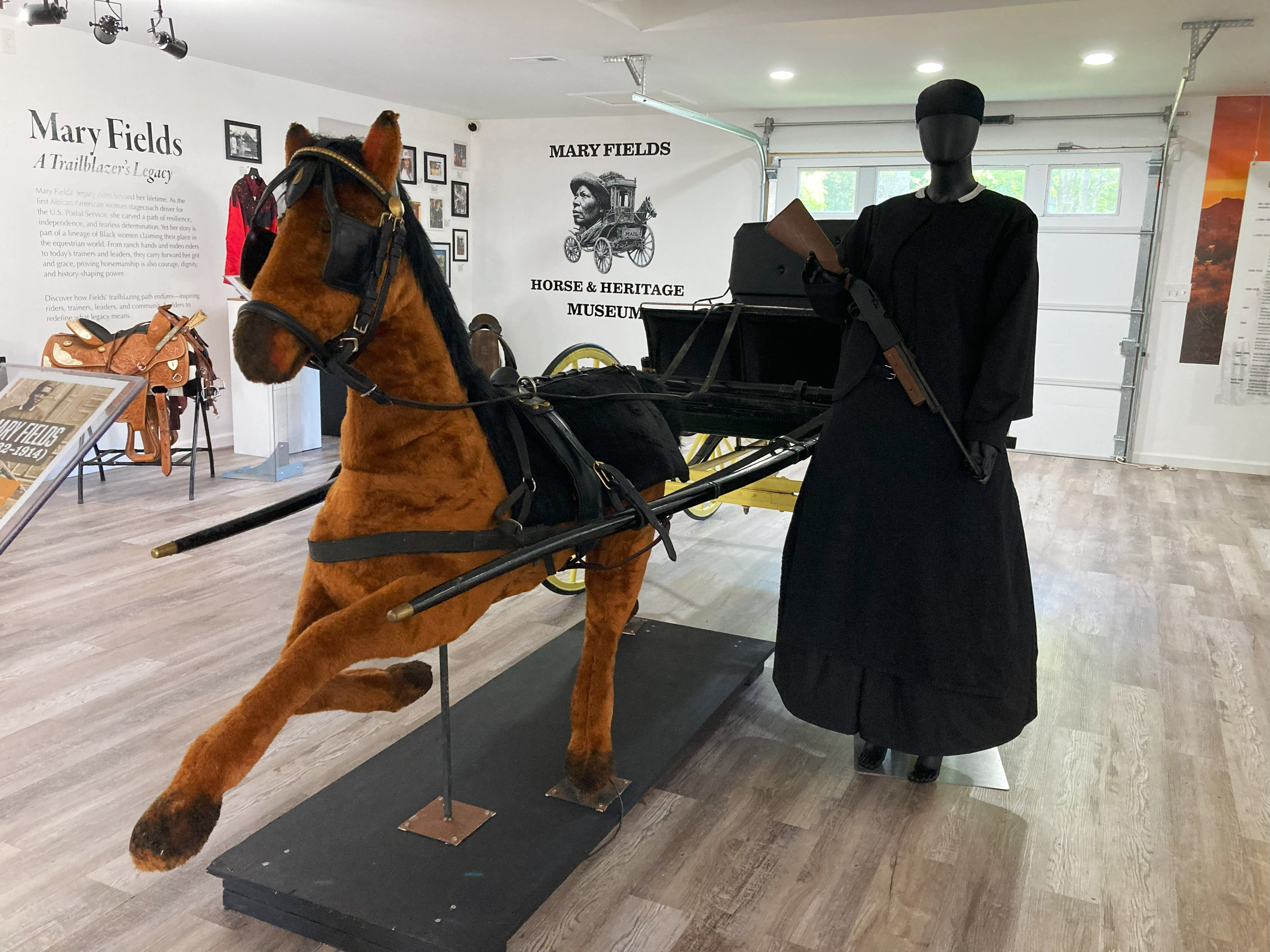
Mary Fields Horse & Heritage Museum (Hartford, CT)

The Mary Fields Horse & Heritage Museum opened to the public in October 2025. The museum, which is located in Hartford, Connecticut on the campus of the Ebony Horsewomen, Inc. Equestrian and Therapeutic Center, honors the legacy of Black Cowboys and Indigenous horsemen and women.

=== Places ===
Asteroid 7091 Maryfields, discovered by Kenneth Lawrence and Eleanor Helin at Palomar in 1992, was named in her honor. The official naming citation was published by the Minor Planet Center on 8 November 2019 (M.P.C. 118218).
