= Mother Mary Amadeus of the Heart of Jesus =

American Roman Catholic nun (1846–1919)

Mother Mary Amadeus of the Heart of Jesus OSU
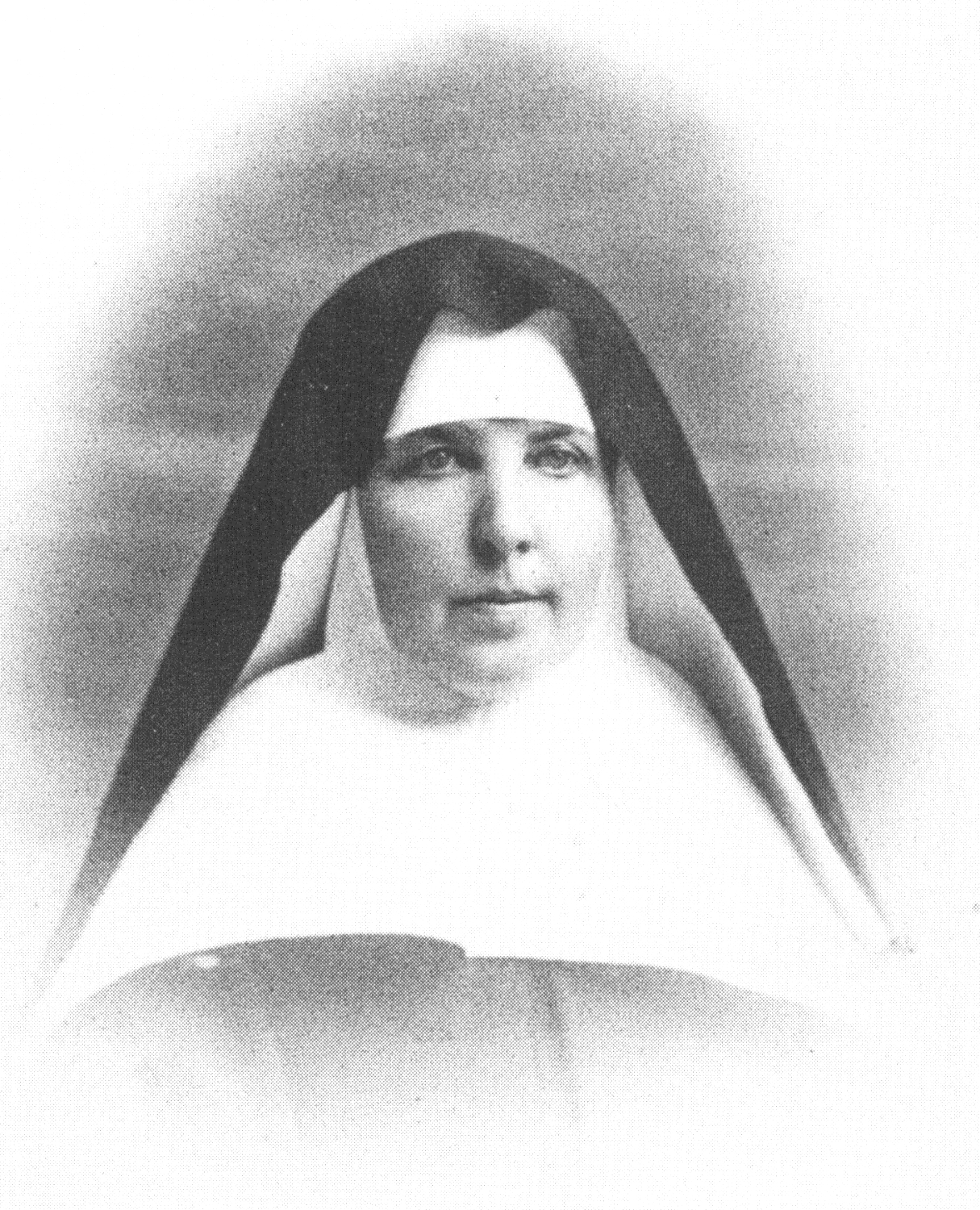

Personal life
- Born: July 2, 1846 Akron, Ohio
- Died: November 10, 1919 (aged 73) Seattle, Washington

Religious life
- Religion: Roman Catholic

Mother Mary Amadeus of the Heart of Jesus (July 2 1846 - November 10 1919) was an American Roman Catholic nun, and founder of the Ursuline Missions of Montana and Alaska.

== Youth and entry into religious life ==
She was born Sarah Therese Dunne on Courthouse Hill, Akron, Ohio, July 2, 1846. Her parents were Eleanor and John Dunne, and they were both born in Ireland. One of her four siblings was the Arizona Territory Supreme Court Justice Edmund Francis Dunne. She made her first holy communion at the young age of eight. At age 10 she entered the school of the Ursuline Sisters of Cleveland.

== Work in the missions ==
She is the founder of the Ursuline missions in Montana and Alaska. In 1884 the founding Bishop of the Roman Catholic Diocese of Helena, Montana, Jean-Baptiste Brondel, invited the Ursulines to work with the Jesuits at St. Peter's Mission Church, and Mother Mary Amadeus came with five Ursulines she had chosen. They founded a boarding school for girls that was open to both settler and native American children. When she became ill in 1885, she was cared for by "Stagecoach Mary" Fields.

== Later life and death ==
She died after a long illness at the Novitiate House of her community in Seattle, Washington, on November 10, 1919.
