= Tom Shinny =

Irish hurler

Personal information
- Native name: Tomás Ó Sionnaigh (Irish)
- Born: 1899 Fedamore, County Limerick, Ireland
- Died: 8 May 1963 (aged 63–64) Dooradoyle, Limerick, Ireland

Sport
- Sport: Hurling
- Position: Goalkeeper
Club
- Years: Club
- Fedamore
Club titles
- Limerick titles: 1
Inter-county
- Years: County
- 1925–1936: Limerick
Inter-county titles
- Munster titles: 0
- All-Irelands: 1
- NHL: 1

Thomas Shinny (1899 – 8 May 1963) was an Irish hurler who played as a goalkeeper for the Limerick senior team.

Born in Fedamore, County Limerick, Shinny first arrived on the inter-county scene at the age of twenty-five when he first linked up with the Limerick senior team. He made his senior debut during a tournament game in 1925. Shinny went on to enjoy a lengthy inter-county career, and won one All-Ireland medal and one National Hurling League medal.

Shinny represented the Munster inter-provincial team at various times, winning two Railway Cup medals on the field of play and a third as a substitute. At club level he won one championship medal with Fedamore.

His retirement from inter-county hurling came following the conclusion of the 1935–36 National Hurling League.

== Playing career ==
=== Club ===
Shinny was in goal for Fedamore when the club reached the club championship decider in 1927. A 5–1 to 1–3 defeat of Young Irelands gave him a Limerick Senior Hurling Championship medal.

=== Inter-county ===
Following some impressive performances for his club, Shinny joined the Limerick senior team and was first choice goalkeeper for the team's unsuccessful Thomond Feis campaign in 1926.

Shinny played for Limerick at a time when the team's fortunes were at a low ebb, with Cork dominating the provincial series. He retired from inter-county hurling in 1930.

In 1934, Limerick were held to a draw by Dublin in the All-Ireland decider. Three days before the replay regular goalkeeper Paddy Scanlan was taken ill and was forced to withdraw from the team. Shinny made a sensational return as goalkeeper. The replay turned out to be an even closer affair than the first game, with both sides level with two minutes to go. Points from Mick Mackey and Jackie O'Connell and a remarkable four goals from Dave Clohessy secured a 5–2 to 2–6 victory for Limerick. The win gave Shinny an All-Ireland medal in the golden jubilee year of the Gaelic Athletic Association.

Shinny remained on the team for another few years as sub goalkeeper. He won a National Hurling League medal in 1936 as Limerick remained undefeated during their eight-game campaign. Shinny retired from inter-county hurling shortly after this victory.

=== Inter-provincial ===
Shinny also lined out with Munster in the inter-provincial series of games, and enjoyed much success during a brief career. He won his first Railway Cup medal as a non-playing substitute in 1928 as Munster defeated arch rivals Leinster by 2–2 to 1–2.

In 1929 Shinny broke onto the starting fifteen as first choice goalkeeper. A 5–3 to 3–1 defeat of Leinster once again gave him a second Railway Cup medal. Munster made it three-in-a-row in 1930, with Shinny collecting a third winners' medal following a 4–6 to 2–7 defeat of Leinster once again.

== Honours ==
=== Player ===
Fedamore

- Limerick Senior Club Hurling Championship (1): 1927

Limerick

- All-Ireland Senior Hurling Championship (1): 1934
- National Hurling League (1): 1935–36

Munster

- Railway Cup (3): 1928 (sub), 1929, 1930
