= Camp Cooke (Montana) =

U.S. Army military post in the Montana Territory

- Fergus County, Montana

Location
- Coordinates: 47°43′58″N 109°40′34″W

Site history
- Built: July 10, 1866
- Built by: U.S. Army
- Demolished: April 1870

Garrison information
- Past commanders: Major William Clinton (1866–67), Lieutenant Colonel George L. Andrews (1867–70)
- Garrison: 13th Infantry Regiment

Camp Cooke also known as Fort Claggett was a U.S. Army military post on the Missouri River in Montana Territory. The camp was established on July 10, 1866, just upstream from the mouth of the Judith River by the 13th Infantry Regiment. By 1867 Camp Cooke had a strength of approximately 400 men. The army established the post to protect steamboat traffic en route to Fort Benton. The boats carried passengers and freight to supply swiftly growing boom towns at the site of rich gold strikes in the western mountains of the Montana Territory.

The location of the fort was along the upper Missouri River as it crossed the broad eastern plains of Montana, far from the gold camps and boom towns in southwest Montana. The fort was also located deep in the remote badlands, called the Missouri Breaks, which parallels the Missouri River for hundreds of miles. Once the fort was constructed the garrison had little to do. Except for the high water months of May, June and July, Missouri River steamboat traffic was limited. As a result, soldiers were dispatched from Camp Cooke to other more strategic locations in the Montana Territory. Detachments from Camp Cooke guarded major transportation routes in Southwestern Montana, including the roads between Fort Benton and Helena. They built Fort Shaw along that route in 1867 in the Sun River Valley. Other detachments from Camp Cooke built Fort Ellis near Bozeman, Montana in the upper Gallatin Valley, which guarded the critical east-west over land route over Bozeman Pass. Camp Cooke was abandoned less than four years after it was built on March 31, 1870, in response to constant well-founded complaints that the location of the post was too remote.

== Purpose of Camp Cooke ==
The purpose of Camp (Fort) Cooke was to provide protection to Missouri River traffic and settlers in the Montana Territory who were traveling up the Missouri to the goldfields. Following the gold strikes at Bannack, 1862 (Grasshopper Gulch); Virginia City, 1863 (Alder Gulch); Helena, 1864 (Prickly Pear Creek and Last Chance Gulch); and the spectacular gold strikes in 1865 at the Montana Bar and other sites in Confederate Gulch, immigrants poured into the Montana Territory. The gold fields were in southwestern Montana, in the intermontane valleys. The immigrants had to cross the extensive eastern Montana plains, to reach the gold fields. The primary access route to the gold fields was up the Missouri River by steamboat to the head of navigation at Fort Benton. A secondary route for overland travelers was over the Bozeman Trail which branched off from the Oregon Trail in Wyoming Territory, skirted the eastern edge of the Big Horn Mountains after which the trail continued up the Yellowstone River valley to reach the Montana goldfields via the Bozeman Pass.

Settlers and miners traveling to the Montana goldfields crossed territory that Indian tribes considered theirs. These lands were occupied by the Blackfoot, Gros Ventre, Assiniboine, Lakota Sioux, Northern Cheyenne, and Crow tribes. The Missouri River steamboats and the resulting freight routes fanning out from the Missouri River, and the overland immigrant trains coming up the Bozeman Trail, drove off the buffalo and other game on which the Indian depended. In reaction, the Indians retaliated by mounting small scale, scattered, guerrilla type attacks and raids. The Indians attacked steamboats and freight wagons. They attacked parties of overland immigrant and mail carriers. They stole livestock and killed travelers and settlers as opportunity presented.

== First army post in Montana Territory ==
As reports of thefts of livestock and killings by Indians accumulated, the newspapers that had sprung up in the swiftly growing mining and trading communities of the Montana Territory demanded that the U.S. Army provide protection. Petitions and letters went east to Washington. In response the army established Camp Cooke on the Missouri River in the Montana Territory on July 10, 1866. To protect the Bozeman Trail, the army had established forts in Dakota Territory at Fort Reno (1865) and Fort Phil Kearny (1866). On August 12, 1866, the army established Fort C.F. Smith on the Big Horn River just inside the boundary of Montana Territory. Thus, by the narrow margin of one month, Camp Cooke became the first U.S. Army post in the Montana Territory.

== Naming Camp Cooke ==
Camp Cooke was named in honor of Brig. Gen. Philip St. George Cooke. In 1866 he was in command of the Department of the Platte, which then included the Montana Territory.

== Locating Camp Cook ==
Inspector General D.B. Sackett was sent to Montana to select a site for the military outpost to protect the traffic on the Missouri River. The logical site was Ft. Benton, the head of navigation on the Missouri River. However Sackett judged that Ft. Benton had sufficient resources to defend itself, and the considered the area lacked materials for the construction of a post, and also lacked sufficient range for the maintenance of its livestock. He recommended a site at the mouth of the Musselshell River, where a small community existed. As an alternative Sackett suggested the mouth of the Judith River.

== Remote location of Camp Cooke ==
The Montana Territory gold strikes were located in the intermontane valley region of southwestern Montana, far removed from Camp Cooke. Camp Cooke was in the broad-reaching eastern plains of Montana. Geographically the post was isolated from the western part of the territory. Further, the post was located deep within a several hundred mile stretch of the Missouri River known as the Missouri Breaks, which are steeply eroded badlands bordering the river and separating it from the surrounding eastern Montana plains.

== Protect river traffic ==
Camp Cooke was located on the south side of the Missouri River, just upstream from the mouth of the Judith River. This location was along the Missouri River, a major artery of commerce from the early 1860s to the late 1880s. In this period steamboats brought traffic and passengers to Fort Benton in the Montana Territory. Fort Benton was the head of Missouri River navigation in the Montana Territory. However steamboat traffic on this section of the Missouri was limited to a few months of "high water", which occurred when seasonal runoff of snow melt from the prairies and mountains of Montana made upriver steamboat navigation to Fort Benton possible. Except for the months of May, June and July, steamboat traffic was virtually nonexistent. Downstream from Camp Cooke was the Dauphine Rapids, which were difficult-to-impossible to traverse after the river began to fall after the spring floods. During low water season on the Missouri, most freight and passengers were offloaded down stream from Camp Cooke, at Cow Island and carried by freight wagon to Fort Benton. These freight routes did not pass close to Camp Cooke.

== Abandonment of Camp Cooke ==
Because of its isolation Camp Cooke was abandoned on 31 March 1870, although a rapidly growing infestation of rats at the post helped prompt the decision.

== Visiting the Site of Camp Cooke ==
The Missouri Breaks have resisted settlement and so the site of Camp Cooke remains remote to this day. The site cannot be easily visited. It can be reached by canoeing/floating down the river through the Missouri Breaks, in the section now designated a wild and scenic river and part of the Missouri Breaks National Monument. The site of Camp Cooke is located at River Mile 86.8 Right. Today there are only the foundations of some of the buildings and the usual rubble that remains after buildings were taken away, torn down or simply deteriorated and fell in on themselves.

== Sources ==
Huckabee, Rodger Lee, "Camp Cooke: The First Army Post in Montana – Success and Failure on the Missouri" (2010). Boise State University Theses and Dissertations. Paper 153.
