= Shinney =

Game from North America

Shinney is a game from North America.

"For Salish Indians, shinney was a game for women." A shinney ball is made of "buffalo hair, sand, suede and sinew." For other Montana tribes, everyone played, according to the International Traditional Games Society in East Glacier.

Jeremy Red Eagle of Helena introduces some of the level 1 participants to shinney and double ball, which he describes as “another way of fighting without fighting.” The smallest fields were the length of three football fields, he tells the younger people getting ready to play, and the longest could go three miles. That was the distance between the goals, often tree branches, that competitors would travel while using sticks to try to hurl or catch a ball or balls over or under the goals or, in the case of double ball, wrap around the branch. In reality, however, the fields had no boundaries. There are stories, Red Eagle says, of teams with 100 players apiece, and while they are physical games, there were rules, he adds: “Men can’t get rough with women, and women can’t get rough with kids.”

The game is most similar to modern day hockey or lacrosse. Many different types were played in different Native American tribes.
