= List of mountains in Teton County, Montana =

There are at least 44 named mountains in Teton County, Montana.

- Antelope Butte, 47°58′42″N 112°38′47″W, el. 5,253 feet (1,601 m)
- Arsenic Mountain, 47°40′58″N 112°48′59″W, el. 8,487 feet (2,587 m)
- Bennie Hill, 48°04′44″N 112°49′45″W, el. 7,661 feet (2,335 m)
- Bloody Hill, 48°02′23″N 112°52′07″W, el. 8,015 feet (2,443 m)
- Bosseler Ridge, 47°49′02″N 111°43′18″W, el. 4,012 feet (1,223 m)
- Bum Shot Mountain, 48°04′29″N 112°51′41″W, el. 7,533 feet (2,296 m)
- Castle Reef, 47°39′45″N 112°42′11″W, el. 8,327 feet (2,538 m)
- Cave Mountain, 47°54′13″N 112°44′48″W, el. 7,474 feet (2,278 m)
- Choteau Mountain, 47°56′01″N 112°42′46″W, el. 8,386 feet (2,556 m)
- Chute Mountain, 47°47′15″N 112°41′39″W, el. 7,654 feet (2,333 m)
- Clay Hill, 47°47′53″N 112°22′02″W, el. 4,272 feet (1,302 m)
- Crab Butte, 47°52′44″N 112°39′33″W, el. 5,725 feet (1,745 m)
- Crooked Mountain, 48°06′25″N 112°54′18″W, el. 7,267 feet (2,215 m)
- Ear Mountain, 47°49′25″N 112°41′25″W, el. 8,527 feet (2,599 m)
- Elk Hill, 47°41′06″N 112°52′42″W, el. 5,607 feet (1,709 m)
- Floweree Butte, 47°31′21″N 111°57′04″W, el. 4,108 feet (1,252 m)
- Grass Hill, 47°43′01″N 112°44′29″W, el. 8,153 feet (2,485 m)
- Horse Hill, 47°43′23″N 112°52′32″W, el. 5,646 feet (1,721 m)
- Hurricane Mountain (Montana), 48°06′21″N 112°51′41″W, el. 7,290 feet (2,220 m)
- Indian Head Rock (Montana), 47°52′37″N 112°41′13″W, el. 5,784 feet (1,763 m)
- Moehler Hill, 47°37′34″N 112°03′52″W, el. 3,911 feet (1,192 m)
- Mount Drouillard, 48°05′06″N 112°55′29″W, el. 8,179 feet (2,493 m)
- Mount Field, 48°07′05″N 112°59′00″W, el. 8,560 feet (2,610 m)
- Mount Frazier, 48°01′05″N 112°45′06″W, el. 8,261 feet (2,518 m)
- Mount Lockhart, 47°55′24″N 112°50′59″W, el. 8,668 feet (2,642 m)
- Mount Patrick Gass, 48°01′58″N 112°52′35″W, el. 8,405 feet (2,562 m)
- Mount Sentinel, 48°07′33″N 112°55′33″W, el. 7,621 feet (2,323 m)
- Mount Werner, 47°59′49″N 112°44′36″W, el. 8,038 feet (2,450 m)
- Mount Wright, 47°58′41″N 112°50′52″W, el. 8,858 feet (2,700 m)
- Mule Hill, 47°42′51″N 112°52′32″W, el. 5,384 feet (1,641 m)
- Nunemaker Hill, 47°41′29″N 112°20′08″W, el. 4,327 feet (1,319 m)
- Old Baldy, 47°51′13″N 112°49′22″W, el. 9,085 feet (2,769 m)
- Old Man of the Hills, 48°03′11″N 112°46′21″W, el. 8,182 feet (2,494 m)
- Pine Butte, 47°50′20″N 112°32′22″W, el. 5,007 feet (1,526 m)
- Poker Butte, 47°52′27″N 112°23′50″W, el. 4,373 feet (1,333 m)
- Priest Butte, 47°45′09″N 112°07′52″W, el. 4,160 feet (1,270 m)
- Rattlesnake Butte, 47°45′24″N 112°09′32″W, el. 4,390 feet (1,340 m)
- Rocky Mountain, 47°48′45″N 112°48′01″W, el. 9,377 feet (2,858 m)
- Sevenmile Hill, 47°42′53″N 112°13′24″W, el. 4,544 feet (1,385 m)
- Spring Hill, 48°01′52″N 112°25′00″W, el. 4,593 feet (1,400 m)
- Sulphur Hill, 47°44′18″N 112°52′32″W, el. 5,535 feet (1,687 m)
- Teton Buttes, 47°48′45″N 112°21′52″W, el. 4,452 feet (1,357 m)
- Teton Peak, 47°53′18″N 112°50′22″W, el. 8,399 feet (2,560 m)
- Wind Mountain, 47°52′31″N 112°42′53″W, el. 6,699 feet (2,042 m)

== See also ==
- List of mountains in Montana
- List of mountain ranges in Montana
