= Arod Lakes =

Set of lakes in Montana, United States

- Arod Lake, Middle Lake, Round Lake,Lower Eyruad Lake, Eyruad Lakes
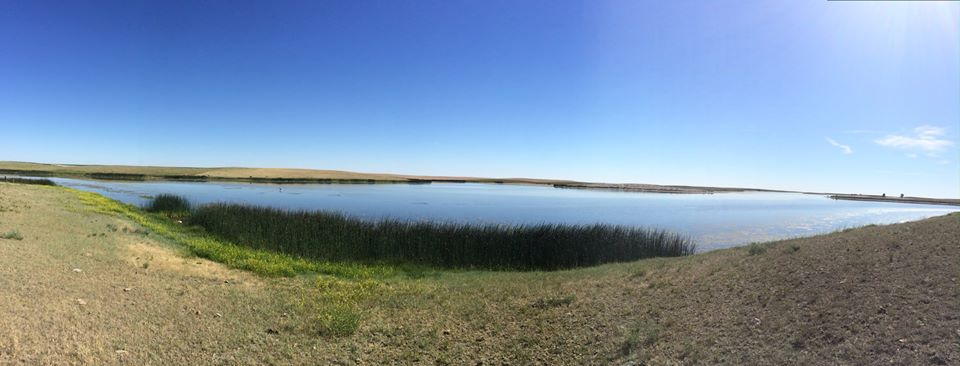
- One of three lakes in Arod Lake WPA outside Choteau, Montana
- Interactive map of Arod Lakes
- Location: Choteau, Montana
- Coordinates: 47°59′46″N 112°01′16″W
- Etymology: Eyruad family, landowner outside of Choteau, Montana. The spelling of the original lakes' name eventually morphed from Eyruad Lakes to Arod Lakes
- Managing agency: Montana Department of Fish, Wildlife, and Parks
- Surface area: 41.1 acres (16.6 ha)
- Surface elevation: 3,754 ft (1,144 m)

Arod Lakes, also known as Eyruad Lakes, or the Arod Lakes Wildlife Production Area is a set of lakes outside of Choteau, Montana. The lakes offer fishing and other recreational activities, and crucial land for wildlife production.

== History ==
The land was purchased in 1992. Arod Lakes WPA was established in 1993 when the Montana Department of Fish, Wildlife, and Parks purchased the land from some local farmers. Later after, they improved the area with the addition of ponds, canals, a restroom, access roads, a fishing access area, and informational signs. Additionally, they also seeded over 500 acres with tall wheatgrass, intermediate wheatgrass, alfalfa, and sweetclover to provide coverage for wildlife.

== Set-up ==
Arod Lakes WPA consists of three main lakes and small unnamed ponds and canals. The three lakes are:

- Arod Lake
- Round Lake
- Middle Lake (sometimes known as Lower Eyruad Lake)

Although each lake does have its own separate name, all three are commonly referred to as the Arod Lakes.

== Wildlife ==
Arod Lakes contain two fish species: the Northern Pike and Yellow Perch. The lakes are specifically known for having sizeable amounts of both fish species.

In addition to fish, many other species of waterfowl and mammals can be seen near the lakes, including the Grizzly Bear, mule deer, white-tailed deer, ring-necked pheasants, snow geese, gray partridge, California gulls, Canada geese, and white pelicans.

== See Also ==
- Freezeout Lake
- Priest Butte Lake
