= Choteau Mountain =

Mountain in Montana, US

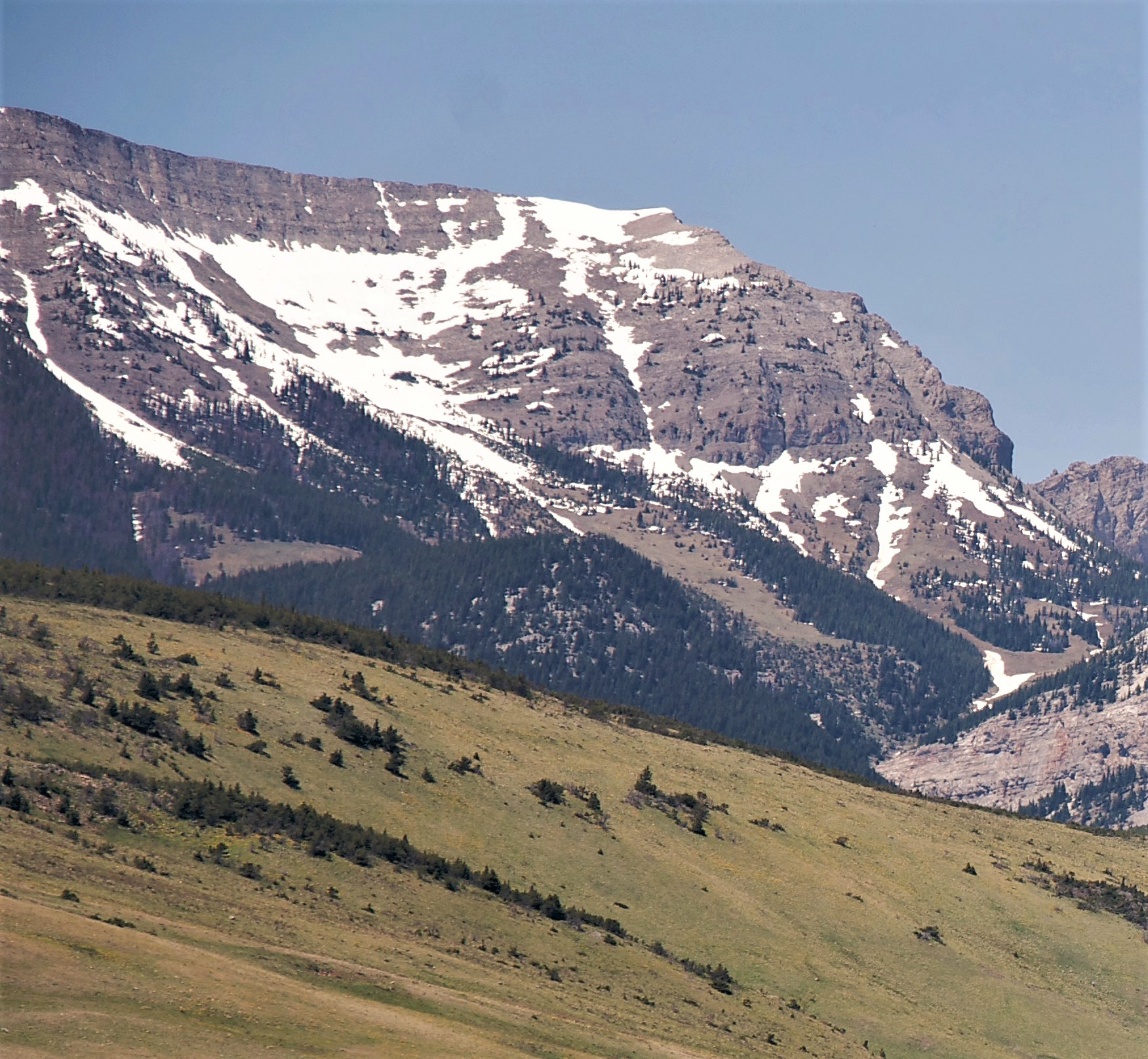
- Southeast aspect

Highest point
- Elevation: 8,398 ft (2,560 m)
- Prominence: 798 ft (243 m)
- Parent peak: Peak 8413 (Guthrie Peak)
- Isolation: 1.13 mi (1.82 km)
- Coordinates: 47°56′00″N 112°42′46″W

Naming
- Etymology: Pierre Chouteau Jr.

Geography
- Location within Montana Location within the United States
- Location: Teton County, Montana, U.S.
- Parent range: Rocky Mountains; Rocky Mountain Front; Sawtooth Range
- Topo map: USGS Cave Mountain

Geology
- Rock type: limestone

Choteau Mountain is an 8,398-foot (2,560-metre) mountain summit located in Teton County, Montana.

== Description ==
Choteau Mountain is located along the Rocky Mountain Front, which is a subset of the Rocky Mountains. It is situated 26 miles northwest of the town of Choteau, in the Lewis and Clark National Forest. Precipitation runoff from the mountain drains into tributaries of the Teton River. Topographic relief is significant as the southwest aspect rises 3,200 feet (980 meters) above the river in two miles, and the east aspect rises 3,700 feet (1,100 meters) above the prairie.

== Geology ==
Choteau Mountain is composed of sedimentary rock laid down during the Precambrian to Jurassic periods. Formed in shallow seas, this sedimentary rock was pushed east and over the top of younger rock during the Laramide orogeny. The Lewis Overthrust extends over 280 miles (450 km) from Mount Kidd in Alberta, south to Steamboat Mountain which is located 46 miles south of Choteau Mountain, which places Choteau Mountain within the southern part of the Lewis Overthrust.

== Climate ==
Based on the Köppen climate classification, Choteau Mountain is located in a subarctic climate zone characterized by long, usually very cold winters, and mild to warm summers. Winter temperatures can drop below −10 °F with wind chill factors below −30 °F.

== Gallery ==
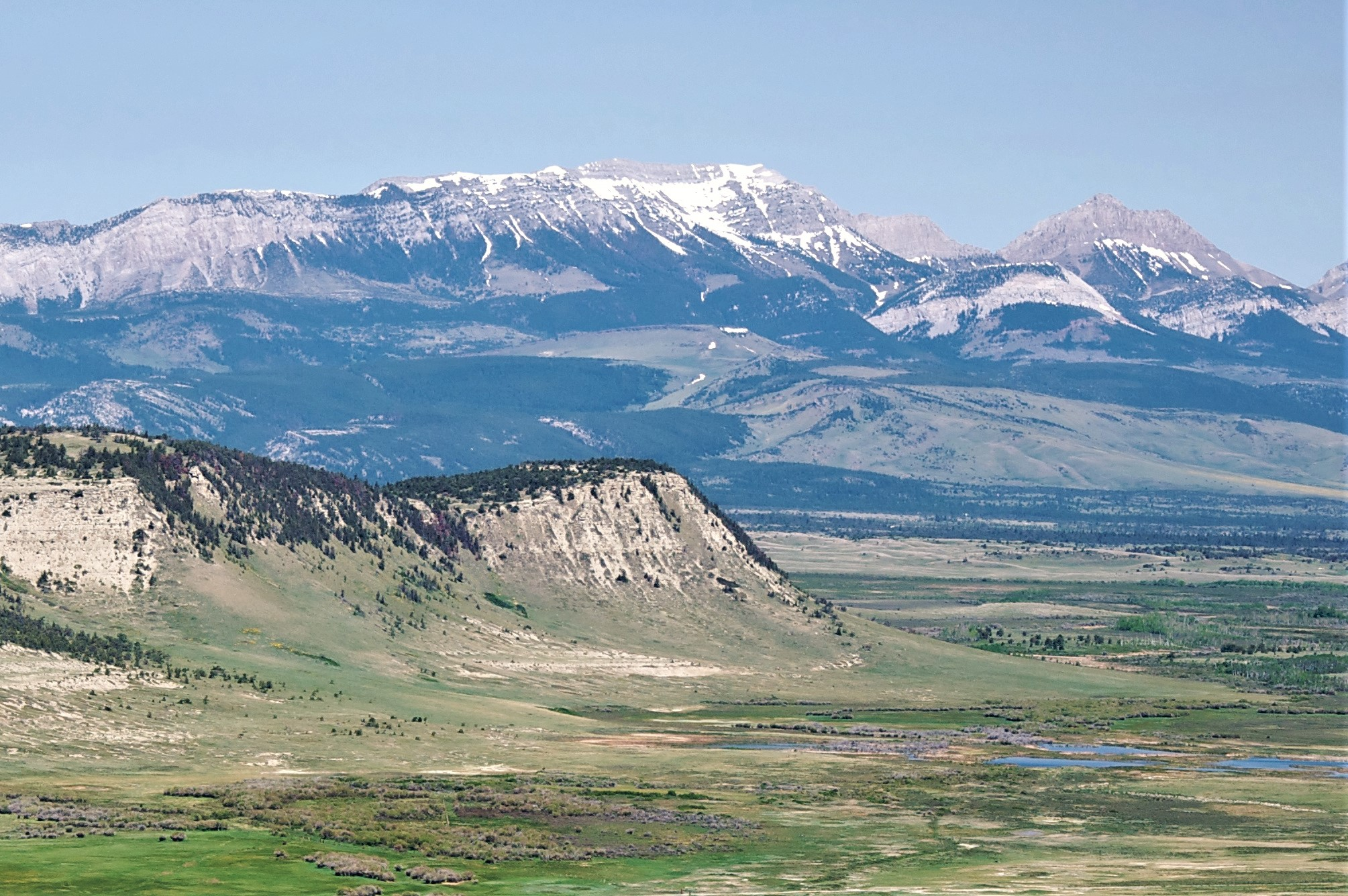
Aerial view of Choteau Mountain centered on horizon, with Guthrie Peak (right)

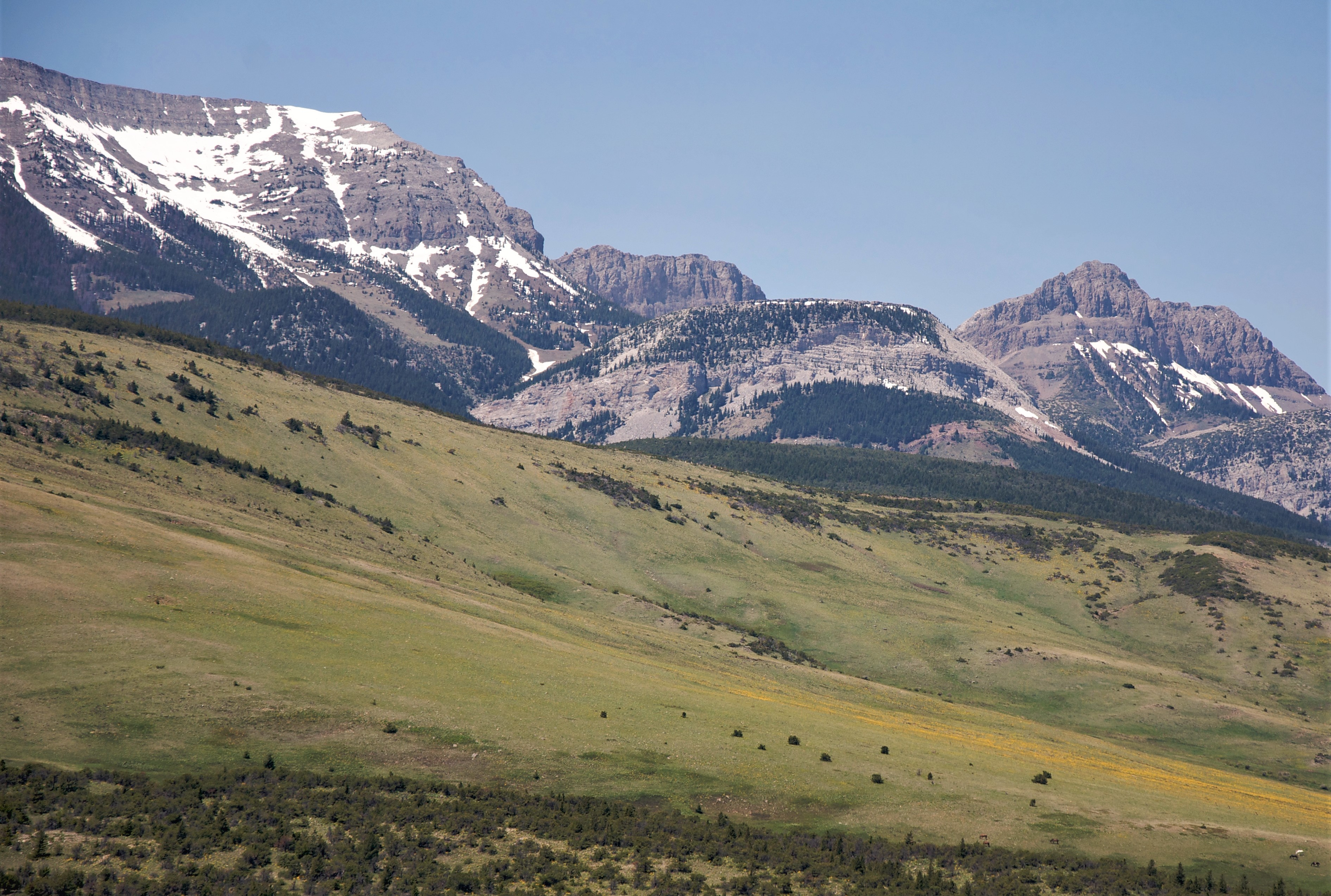
Choteau Mountain (left), with parent Guthrie Peak (right)

== See also ==
- Geology of the Rocky Mountains
