= Rattlesnake Butte (Montana) =

Butte in Montana, United States

Highest point
- Elevation: 4,390 feetwww.topozone.com/montana/teton-mt/summit/rattlesnake-butte-28/
- Coordinates: 47.755752°N 112.159925°W

Naming
- Etymology: Abundance of rattlesnakes on the butte

Geography
- Location: Choteau Montana
- District: Teton County, Montana

Rattlesnake Butte is a butte in Teton County, Montana. The butte is located in-between Fairfield and Choteau on US 89, and offers recreational opportunities.

== History ==
Before settlement of the area, Rattlesnake Butte and other nearby landmarks were often used for directional help by Native Americans. It is also possible the butte was used for other purposes by Native Americans. In 1906, rock from Priest Butte and Rattlesnake Butte was quarried and used in the building of the Teton County Courthouse.

== Geology ==
Rattlesnake Butte and other buttes in the area were likely formed by the weathering of ridges and terraces of the Virgelle Formation, a sandstone formation. It is also possible that the butte was part of a sandstone table that broke off due to erosion.

The butte contains very steep rocky, grassy, and barren sides and a flat and grassy top.

== Twin Butte ==
- Priest Butte is Rattlesnake Butte's sister butte.

== See also ==
- Priest Butte Lake
- Freezout Lake
- Lake Choteau
