= Castle Reef =

Mountain in Montana, United States

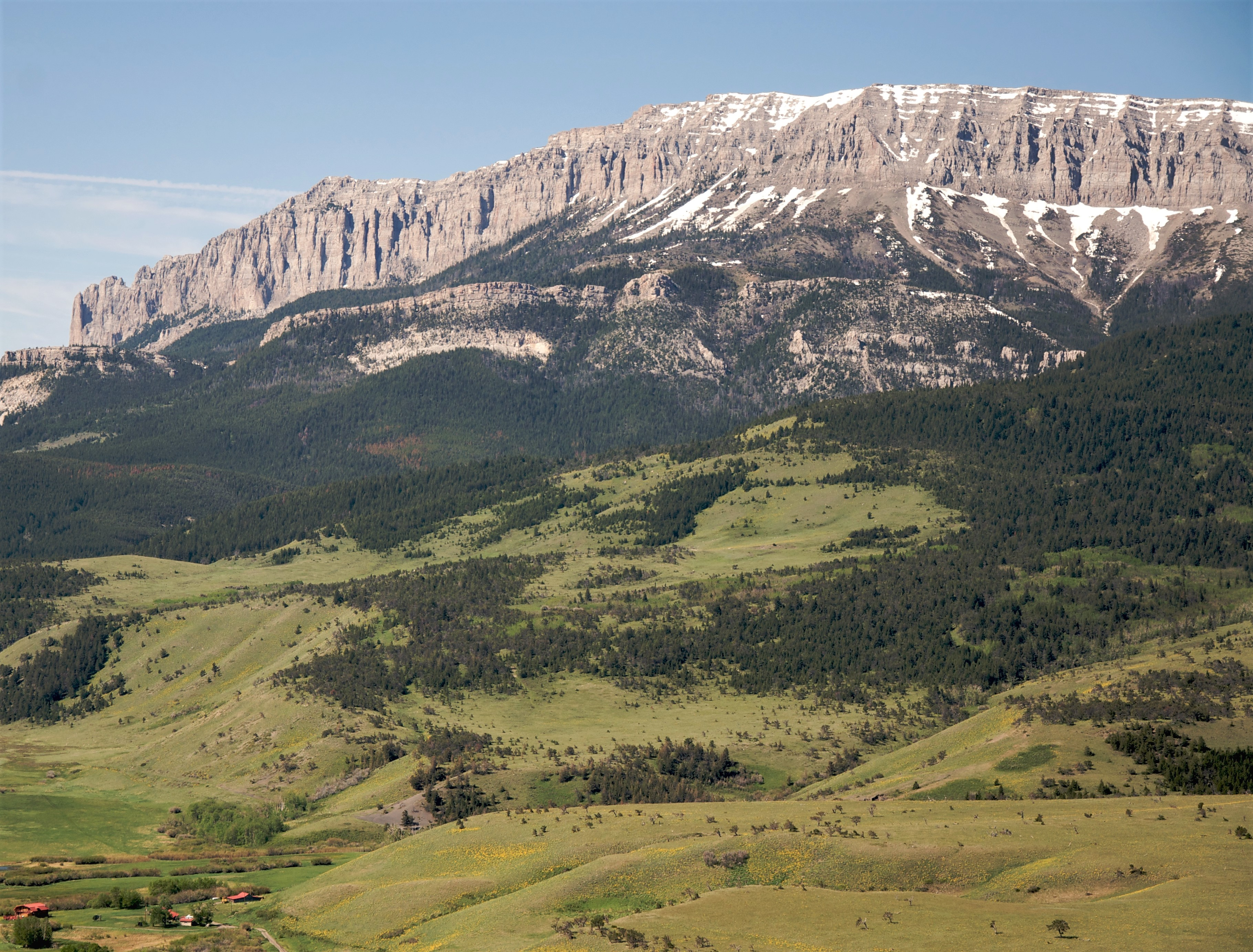
- Northeast aspect

Highest point
- Elevation: 8,330 ft (2,539 m)
- Prominence: 1,410 ft (430 m)
- Parent peak: Peak 8453
- Isolation: 5.01 mi (8.06 km)
- Coordinates: 47°39′45″N 112°42′11″W

Geography
- Location within Montana Location within the United States
- Location: Teton County, Montana, U.S.
- Parent range: Rocky Mountains; Rocky Mountain Front
- Topo map: USGS Castle Reef

Geology
- Rock age: Mississippian
- Rock type(s): dolomite, limestone

Castle Reef is an 8,330-foot (2,539-metre) mountain summit located in Teton County of the U.S. state of Montana.

== Description ==
Castle Reef is located in the Rocky Mountain Front, which is a subset of the Rocky Mountains. It is situated 26 miles west-southwest of Choteau, in Lewis and Clark National Forest. Precipitation runoff from the mountain drains into tributaries of the Sun River. Topographic relief is significant as the east aspect rises nearly 4,000 feet (1,200 meters) above the prairie. Neighbors include Sawtooth Ridge seven miles to the south, and Ear Mountain 11 miles to the north.

== Geology ==
Castle Reef is composed of sedimentary rock laid down during the Precambrian to Jurassic periods. Formed in shallow seas, this sedimentary rock was pushed east and over the top of younger rock during the Laramide orogeny. The Lewis Overthrust extends over 280 miles (450 km) from Mount Kidd in Alberta, south to Steamboat Mountain which is located 25 miles south of Castle Reef, which places Castle Reef within the southern extent of the Lewis Overthrust. The Castle Reef Formation takes its name from Castle Reef, as it is the type locality.

== Climate ==
Based on the Köppen climate classification, Castle Reef is located in a subarctic climate zone characterized by long, usually very cold winters, and mild to warm summers. Winter temperatures can drop below −10 °F with wind chill factors below −30 °F.

== See also ==
- Geology of the Rocky Mountains
