= Sawtooth =

Sawtooth may refer to:

== Science and technology ==
- Tooth of a saw blade (original meaning)
- Sawtooth wave, a type of waveform
- Sawtooth (cellular automaton)
- Tokamak sawtooth, a phenomenon in plasma physics
- Sawtooth, code name for the Power Mac G4
- Sawtooth coriander, a herb also called Culantro
- Sawtooth eel
- Sawtooth Software

== Arts and media ==
- Sawtooth (film), a 2004 American thriller and drama film
- Sawtooth (album), an album by British electronic musician Jonny L

== Places ==
- The Sawtooth, between Mount Evans and Mount Bierstadt in Colorado, United States
- Sawtooth Bridges, rail viaducts on Northeast Corridor in Kearny, New Jersey
- Sawtooth City, Idaho, United States
- Sawtooth National Forest, Idaho, United States
- Sawtooth National Recreation Area, Idaho, United States
- Sawtooth Wilderness, Idaho, United States

== See also ==
- Sawtooth Range (disambiguation)
