= Teton Pass Ski Area =

Ski area in Montana, United States

- Location in the United States Location in Montana
- Location: Teton County, Montana, U.S.
- Nearest city: Choteau
- Coordinates: 47°55′41″N 112°48′55″W
- Vertical: 1,000 ft (305 m)
- Top elevation: 7,200 ft (2,195 m)
- Base elevation: 6,190 ft (1,887 m)
- Skiable area: 114 acres (0.46 km^{2})
- Trails: 26
- Longest run: 0.95 mi (1.5 km)
- Lift system: 1 double chair 1 rope tow
- Snowfall: 250 in (21 ft; 6.4 m)
- Website: Ski Teton Mt.com

Teton Pass Ski Area is an alpine ski area located along the Rocky Mountain Front in northwestern Montana, west of Choteau and east of the Continental Divide. Formerly known as Rocky Mountain Hi in the 1990s, it was bought by New Zealand native Nick Wood in July 2010.

For the 2011–12 season, the resort was unable to obtain insurance and thus did not open its facilities. The resort closed again in 2017 and remained so until 2019 when it was purchased by its former manager and Choteau resident, Charles Hlavac. Initially listed for $3,000,000, it eventually sold for just $345,000.

The resort was forced to close early for the 2023–2024 season. Due to low snowfall and warm temperatures, they were only able to open for four days over the season. The owner opted to close to prevent further financial harm to the resort.

Each year the resort holds the Jack-N-Jill SkiMo Race which is the championship for the Big Sky Skimo Cup Series. SkiMo is short for ski mountaineering, a high-endurance sport in which skiers climb up the mountain on skis and then descend.

In April 2025, Teton Pass Ski Area gained national attention via YouTube. Dude Perfect featured the ski resort in a video titled, "Stranded in Artic Wilderness | Winter Survival Games". The video currently sits at around 8,800,000 views.
