= Old Man of the Hills =

Mountain in Montana, United States

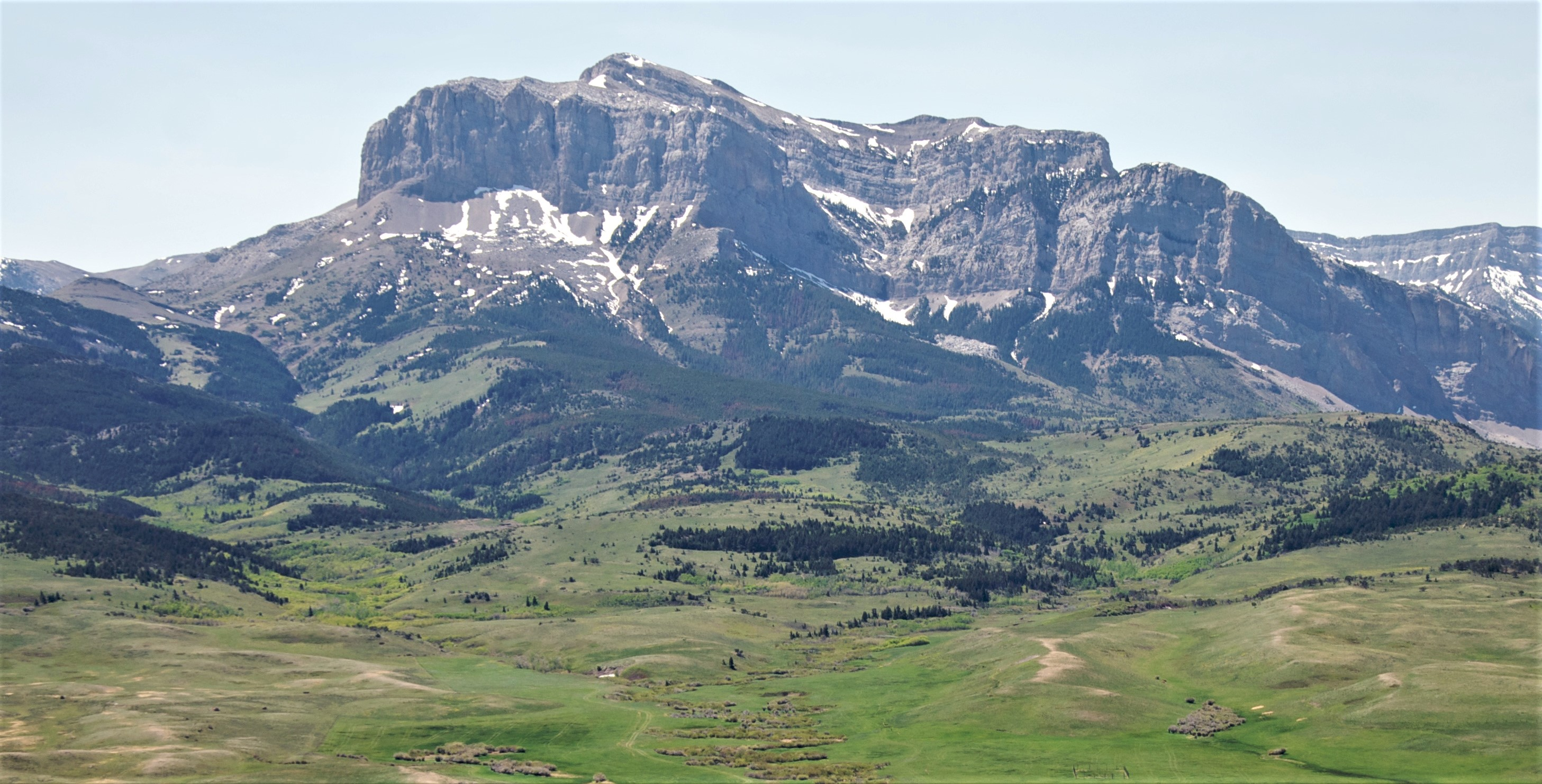
- East aspect

Highest point
- Elevation: 8,229 ft (2,508 m)
- Prominence: 1,549 ft (472 m)
- Parent peak: Mount Frazier (8,315 ft)
- Isolation: 2.59 mi (4.17 km)
- Coordinates: 48°03′10″N 112°46′22″W

Geography
- Location within Montana Location within the United States
- Location: Teton County, Montana, U.S.
- Parent range: Rocky Mountains; Rocky Mountain Front
- Topo map: USGS Walling Reef

Geology
- Rock type: Limestone

Old Man of the Hills is an 8,229-foot (2,508-metre) mountain summit located in Teton County of the U.S. state of Montana.

== Description ==
Old Man of the Hills is located along the Rocky Mountain Front, which is a subset of the Rocky Mountains. It is situated seven miles east of the Continental Divide, along the Bob Marshall Wilderness boundary, on land managed by Lewis and Clark National Forest. The nearest town is Choteau, 32 miles to the southeast, and the nearest higher neighbor is Mount Frazier, 2.6 miles to the south-southeast. Precipitation runoff from the mountain drains into headwaters of Dupuyer Creek, and eventually makes its way to the Marias River. Topographic relief is significant as the summit rises 2,800 feet (850 meters) above the creek in one mile (1.6 km).

== Geology ==
Old Man of the Hills is composed of sedimentary rock laid down during the Precambrian to Jurassic periods. Formed in shallow seas, this sedimentary rock was pushed east and over the top of younger rock during the Laramide orogeny. The Lewis Overthrust extends over 280 miles (450 km) from Mount Kidd in Alberta, south to Steamboat Mountain which is located 55 miles south of Old Man of the Hills, which places Old Man of the Hills within the southern part of the Lewis Overthrust.

== Climate ==
Based on the Köppen climate classification, Old Man of the Hills has an alpine subarctic climate characterized by long, usually very cold winters, and mild to warm summers. Winter temperatures can drop below −10 °F with wind chill factors below −30 °F.

== See also ==
- Geology of the Rocky Mountains
