= Old Baldy (Montana) =

Double summit mountain in Montana

- Variant name: Twin Peak
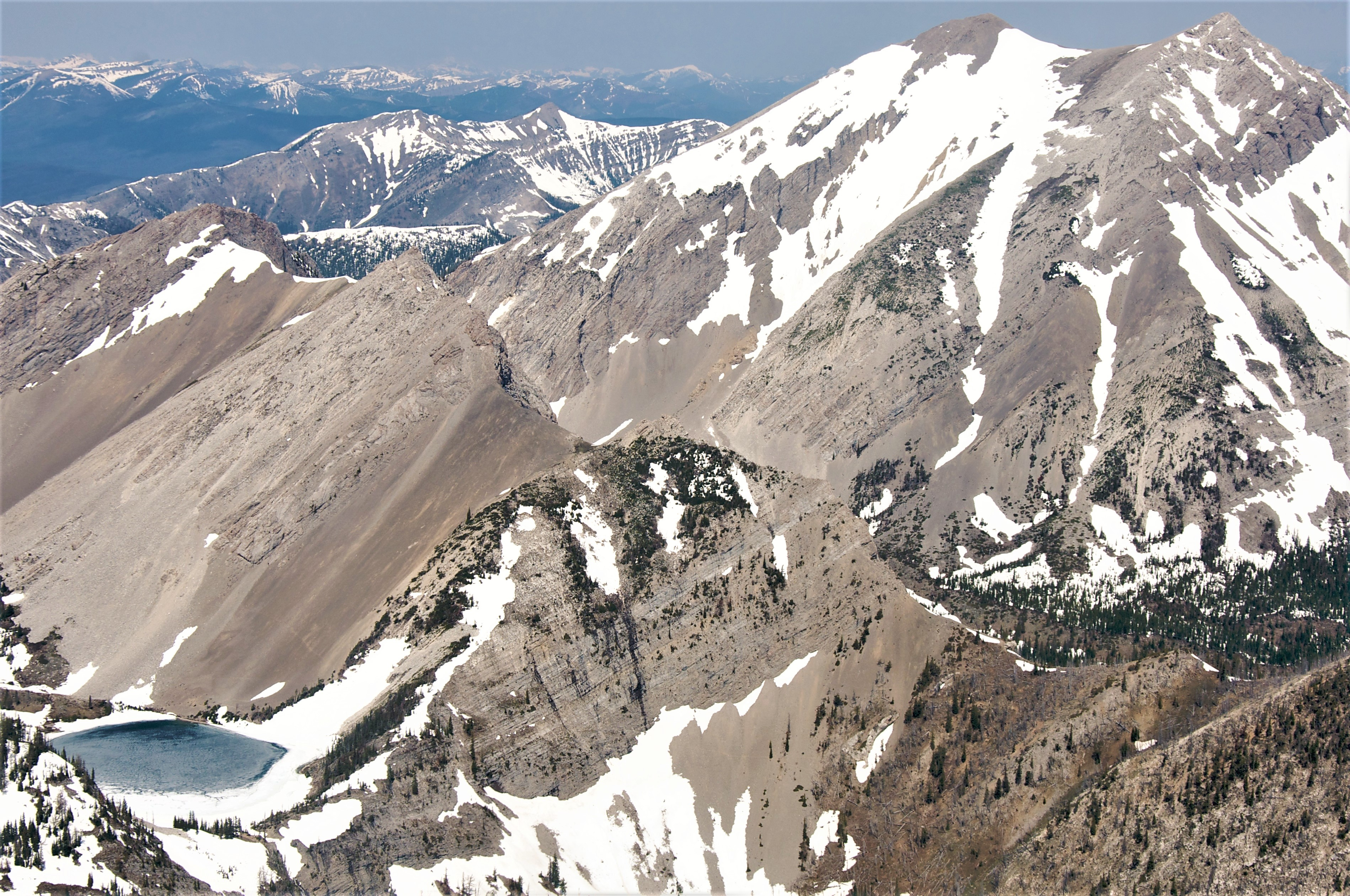
- Aerial view of southeast aspect, upper right. (Our Lake in lower left)

Highest point
- Elevation: 9,156 ft (2,791 m)
- Prominence: 1,356 ft (413 m)
- Parent peak: Rocky Mountain (9,392 ft)
- Isolation: 3.03 mi (4.88 km)
- Coordinates: 47°51′14″N 112°49′23″W

Geography
- Location within Montana Location within the United States
- Location: Teton County, Montana, U.S.
- Parent range: Rocky Mountains; Rocky Mountain Front; Sawtooth Range
- Topo map: USGS Our Lake

Geology
- Rock age: Mississippian
- Rock type(s): dolomite, limestone

Old Baldy is a 9,156-foot (2,791-metre) double summit mountain located in Teton County of the U.S. state of Montana.

== Description ==
The west summit is slightly higher than the 9,150-foot east summit, and approximately 1,000 feet distance separates the two. Old Baldy is located along the Rocky Mountain Front, which is a subset of the Rocky Mountains. It is situated 11 miles east of the Continental Divide, in the Bob Marshall Wilderness, on land managed by Lewis and Clark National Forest. The nearest town is Choteau, 29 miles to the east, and nearest access is the South Fork Teton Road 109. Precipitation runoff from the east side of the mountain drains into headwaters of South Fork Teton River, and the west side drains into tributaries of the North Fork Sun River. Topographic relief is significant as the east aspect rises 3,350 feet (1,020 meters) above South Fork Teton River in two miles. The Old Baldy name was officially adopted by the United States Board on Geographic Names on December 31, 1959.

== Geology ==
Old Baldy is composed of sedimentary rock laid down during the Precambrian to Jurassic periods. Formed in shallow seas, this sedimentary rock was pushed east and over the top of younger rock during the Laramide orogeny. The Lewis Overthrust extends over 280 miles (450 km) from Mount Kidd in Alberta, south to Steamboat Mountain which is located 40 miles south of Old Baldy, which places Old Baldy within the southern extent of the Lewis Overthrust.

== Climate ==
Based on the Köppen climate classification, Old Baldy is located in a subarctic climate zone characterized by long, usually very cold winters, and mild to warm summers. Winter temperatures can drop below −10 °F with wind chill factors below −30 °F.

Rocky Mountain (Montana) is a nearby peak to the south of Old Baldy. There is no weather station, but this climate table contains interpolated data.

Climate data for Rocky Mountain (MT) 47.8077 N, 112.8018 W, Elevation: 8,533 ft (2,601 m) (1991–2020 normals)
| Month | Jan | Feb | Mar | Apr | May | Jun | Jul | Aug | Sep | Oct | Nov | Dec | Year |
|---|---|---|---|---|---|---|---|---|---|---|---|---|---|
| Mean daily maximum °F (°C) | 23.8 (−4.6) | 24.3 (−4.3) | 30.1 (−1.1) | 35.4 (1.9) | 44.4 (6.9) | 52.5 (11.4) | 63.4 (17.4) | 63.1 (17.3) | 53.5 (11.9) | 39.3 (4.1) | 28.3 (−2.1) | 22.5 (−5.3) | 40.1 (4.5) |
| Daily mean °F (°C) | 17.2 (−8.2) | 16.5 (−8.6) | 21.1 (−6.1) | 26.2 (−3.2) | 34.7 (1.5) | 42.2 (5.7) | 51.9 (11.1) | 51.7 (10.9) | 43.2 (6.2) | 31.3 (−0.4) | 21.9 (−5.6) | 16.2 (−8.8) | 31.2 (−0.5) |
| Mean daily minimum °F (°C) | 10.6 (−11.9) | 8.7 (−12.9) | 12.2 (−11.0) | 16.9 (−8.4) | 25.0 (−3.9) | 32.0 (0.0) | 40.4 (4.7) | 40.2 (4.6) | 32.8 (0.4) | 23.3 (−4.8) | 15.4 (−9.2) | 9.9 (−12.3) | 22.3 (−5.4) |
| Average precipitation inches (mm) | 5.39 (137) | 4.90 (124) | 4.84 (123) | 4.47 (114) | 4.39 (112) | 4.81 (122) | 1.82 (46) | 1.78 (45) | 2.53 (64) | 3.82 (97) | 4.97 (126) | 5.54 (141) | 49.26 (1,251) |
Source: PRISM Climate Group

== See also ==
- Geology of the Rocky Mountains
