= Sawtooth Range =

Sawtooth Range, Sawtooth Ridge, and Sawtooth Mountains may refer to:

- Sawtooth Range (Alaska) in Alaska, United States
- Sawtooth Range (San Bernardino County) in California, United States
- Sawtooth Range (San Diego County) in California, United States
- Sawtooth Range (Colorado) in Colorado, United States
- Sawtooth Range (Idaho) in Idaho, United States
- Sawtooth Range (Montana) in Montana, United States
- Sawtooth Range (British Columbia) in the Monashee Mountains of British Columbia, Canada
- Sawtooth Range (Nunavut) in Nunavut, Canada
- Sawtooth Ridge (California, Hoover Wilderness), on the Sierra Crest (38.105251°N 119.395466°W)
- Sawtooth Ridge (California, Tahoe National Forest), in the Lake Tahoe Basin (39.251398°N 120.177212°W)
- Sawtooth Ridge, Montana, United States
- Sawtooth Mountains (Arizona) in Arizona, United States
- Sawtooth Mountains (California) in eastern San Diego County, California, United States
- Sawtooth Mountain (Colorado) in Colorado, United States
- Sawtooth Mountains (Minnesota) in Minnesota, United States
- Sawtooth Mountain (Utah) in Utah, United States
- Sawtooths, a mountain range in San Bernardino County, California

Sawtooth Peak may refer to summits such as:

- Sawtooth Peak (California, Sierra topographic front), on the Sierra Crest (35°49′25″N 117°59′57″W)
- Sawtooth Peak (California, Sequoia National Park), in the Mineral King region (36°27′19″N 118°33′18″W)
