= Sawtooth Ridge =

Mountain ridge in Montana, United States

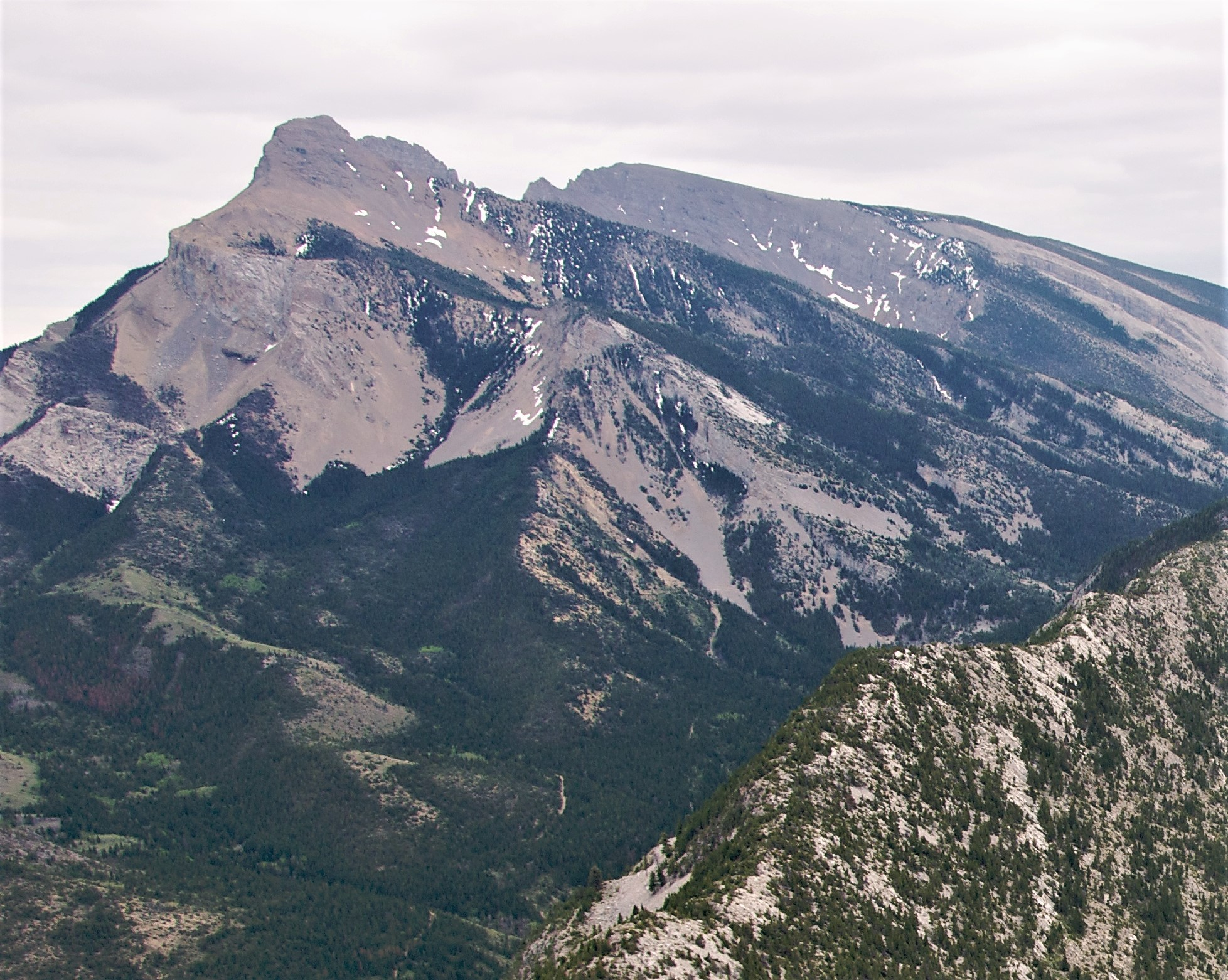
- Aerial view of northwest aspect

Highest point
- Elevation: 8,179 ft (2,493 m)
- Prominence: 2,299 ft (701 m)
- Parent peak: Fairview Mountain (8,246 ft)
- Isolation: 6.57 mi (10.57 km)
- Coordinates: 47°33′49″N 112°40′39″W

Geography
- Location within Montana Location within the United States
- Location: Lewis and Clark County; Montana, United States
- Parent range: Rocky Mountains; Rocky Mountain Front
- Topo map: USGS Sawtooth Ridge

Geology
- Rock age: Mississippian
- Rock type: Limestone

Sawtooth Ridge is an 8,179-foot (2,493-metre) mountain ridge located in Lewis and Clark County, Montana.

== Description ==
Sawtooth Ridge is located along the Rocky Mountain Front, which is a subset of the Rocky Mountains. It is situated 45 miles west of Great Falls, in the Sun River Wildlife Management Area. Precipitation runoff from this landform drains into tributaries of the Sun River. Topographic relief is significant as the east aspect rises approximately 3,700 feet (1,100 meters) above the prairie. Castle Reef is 6.94 miles to the north, but Fairview Mountain is considered to be the nearest higher neighbor, 6.57 miles to the south-southwest.

== Geology ==
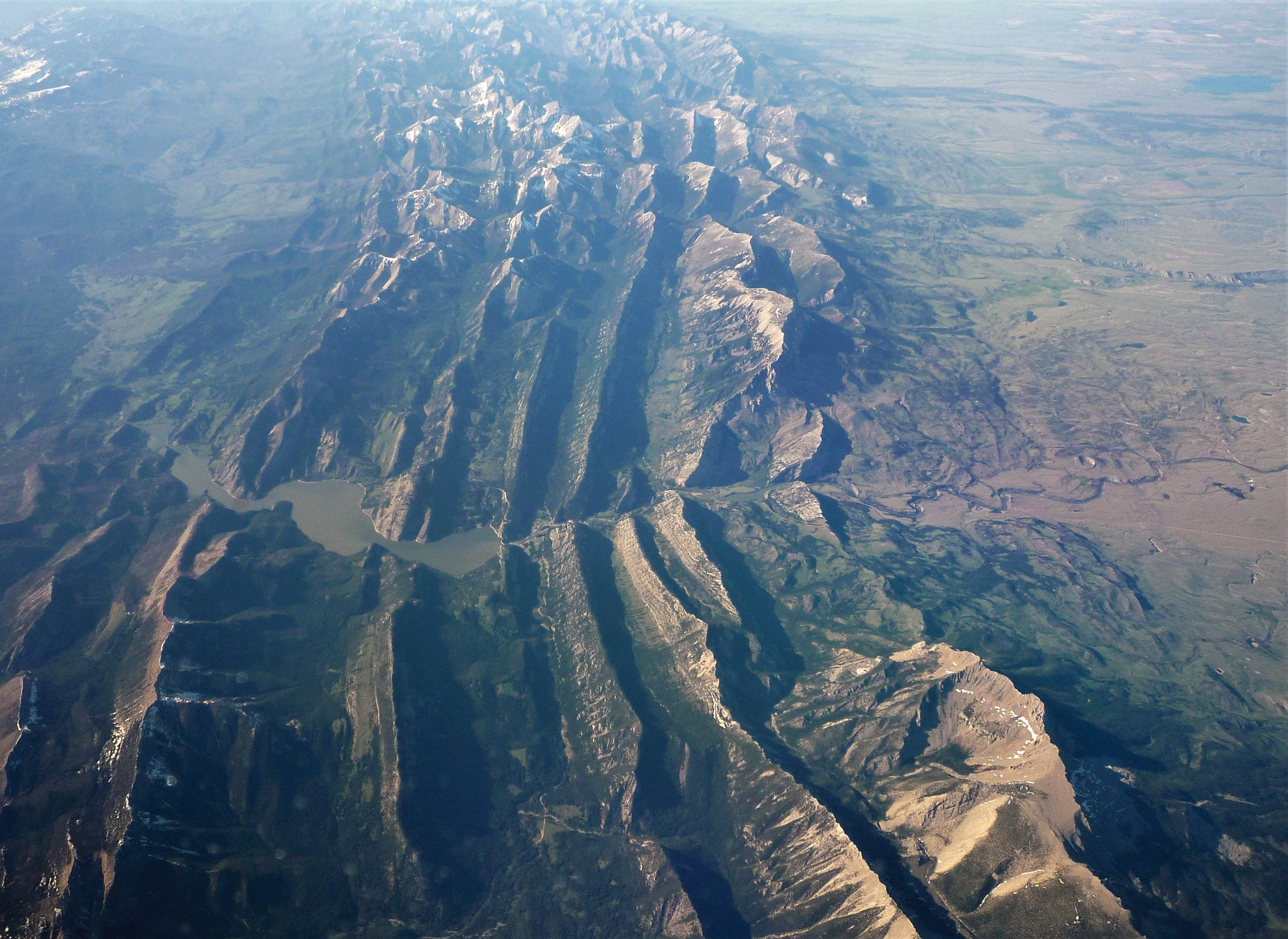
Aerial view of Lewis Overthrust, looking north. Sawtooth Ridge prominent in lower right corner.

Sawtooth Ridge is composed of sedimentary rock laid down during the Precambrian to Jurassic periods. Formed in shallow seas, this sedimentary rock was pushed east and over the top of younger rock during the Laramide orogeny. The Lewis Overthrust extends over 280 miles (450 km) from Mount Kidd in Alberta, south to Steamboat Mountain which is located 18 miles south of Sawtooth Ridge, which places Sawtooth Ridge within the southern extent of the Lewis Overthrust.

== Climate ==
Based on the Köppen climate classification, Sawtooth Ridge has an alpine subarctic climate characterized by long, usually very cold winters, and mild to warm summers. Winter temperatures can drop below −10 °F with wind chill factors below −30 °F.

== See also ==
- Geology of the Rocky Mountains
