= Ear Mountain (Montana) =

Mountain in Montana, United States

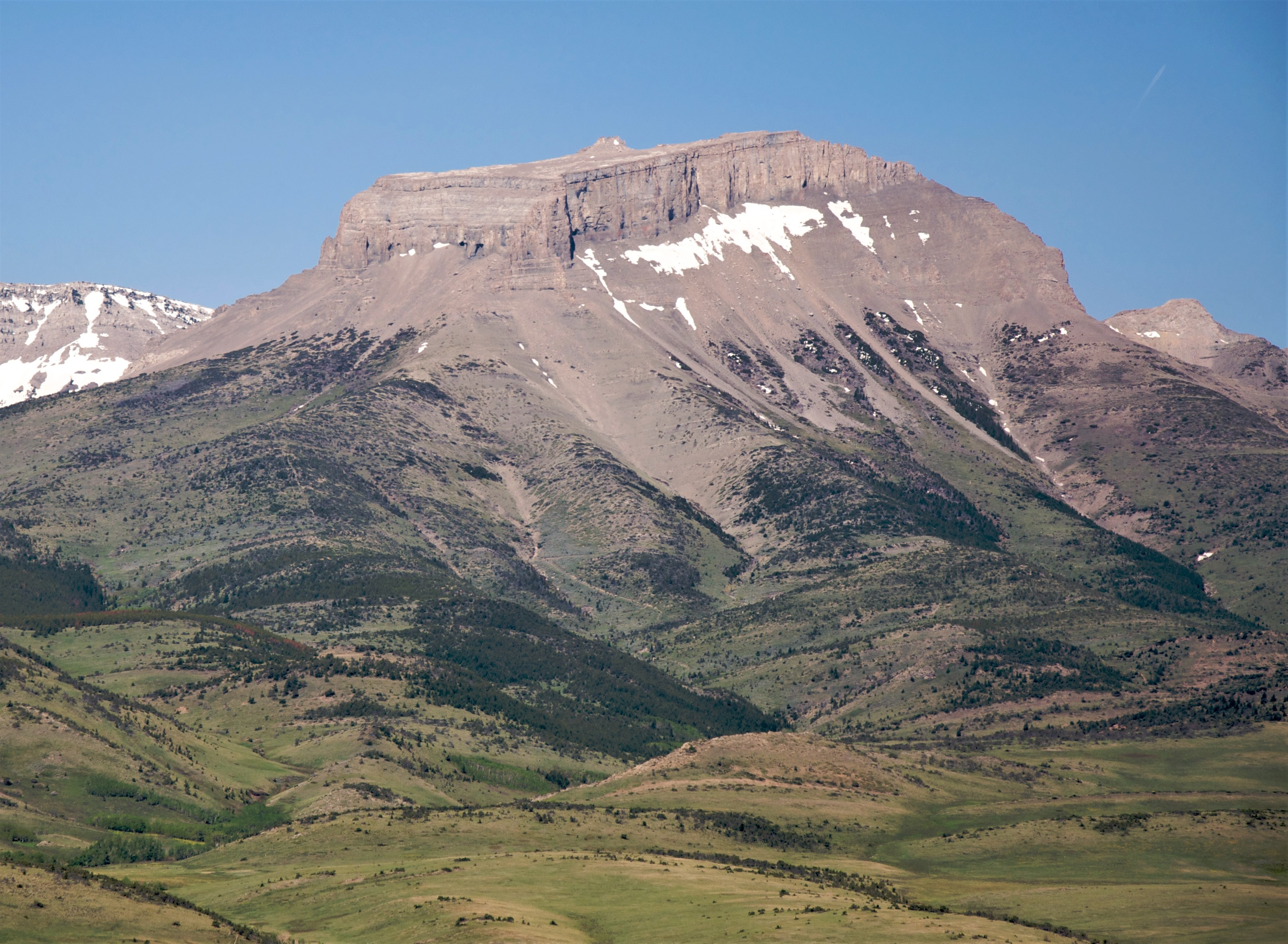
- East aspect

Highest point
- Elevation: 8,560 ft (2,610 m)
- Prominence: 1,440 ft (440 m)
- Parent peak: Peak 9147
- Isolation: 4.55 mi (7.32 km)
- Coordinates: 47°49′24″N 112°41′24″W

Geography
- Location within Montana Location within the United States
- Location: Teton County, Montana, U.S.
- Parent range: Rocky Mountains; Rocky Mountain Front
- Topo map: USGS Ear Mountain

Ear Mountain is an 8,560-foot (2,610-metre) mountain summit located in Teton County of the U.S. state of Montana.

== Description ==
Ear Mountain is located in the Rocky Mountain Front, which is a subset of the Rocky Mountains. It is situated 23 miles west of Choteau, along the common border shared by Bureau of Land Management and Lewis and Clark National Forest. The Ear Mountain Wildlife Management Area is located nearby, to the east of the mountain. Precipitation runoff from the mountain drains into tributaries of the Teton River. Topographic relief is significant as the southwest aspect rises 2,000 feet (610 meters) above South Fork Willow Creek in 0.7 mile, and the east aspect rises 4,000 feet (1,200 meters) above the plains.

== Climate ==
Based on the Köppen climate classification, Ear Mountain is located in a subarctic climate zone characterized by long, usually very cold winters, and mild to warm summers. Winter temperatures can drop below −10 °F with wind chill factors below −30 °F.

== See also ==
- Geology of the Rocky Mountains

== Gallery ==
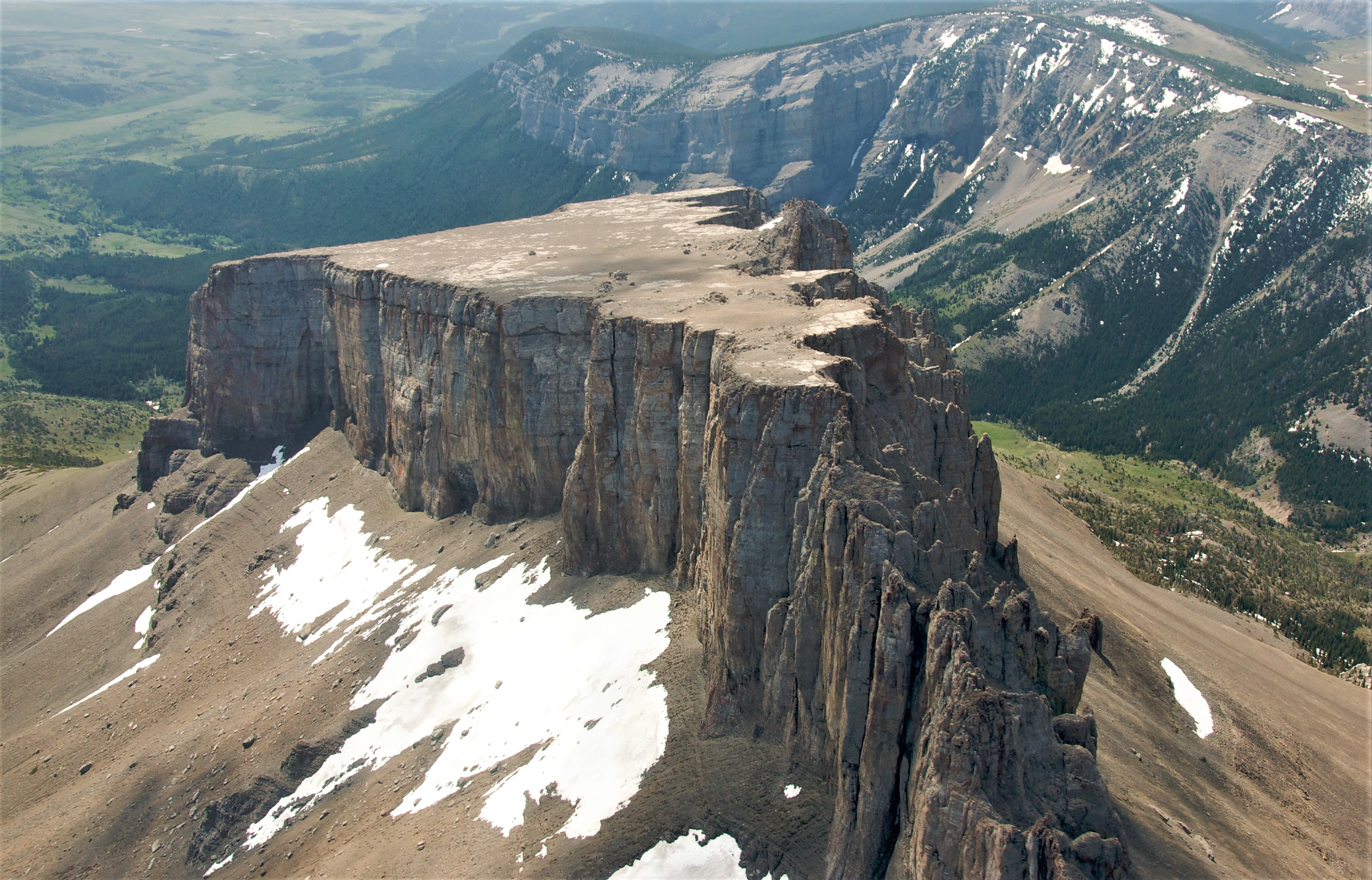
Aerial view of summit, looking south

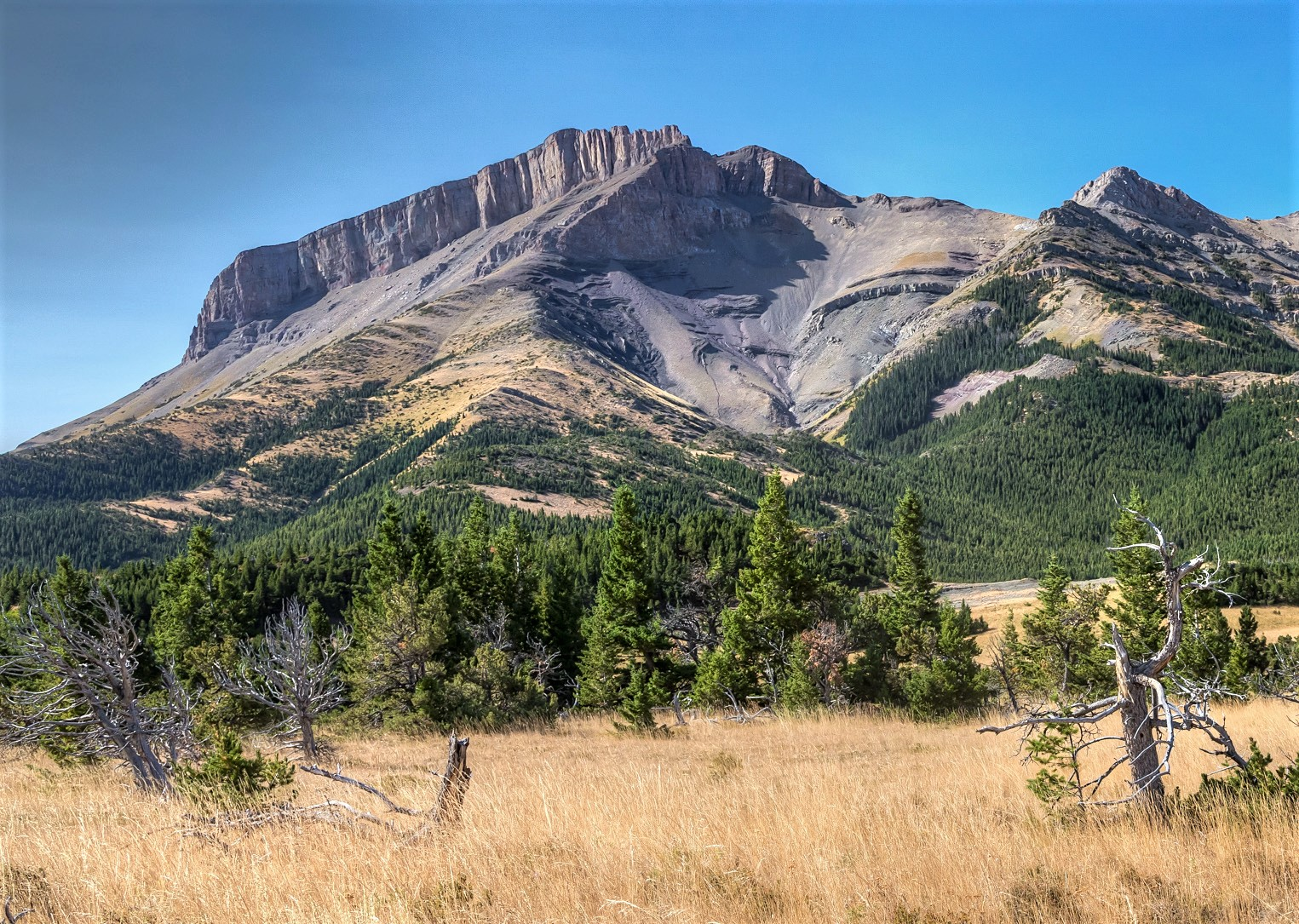
Ear Mountain from the north side

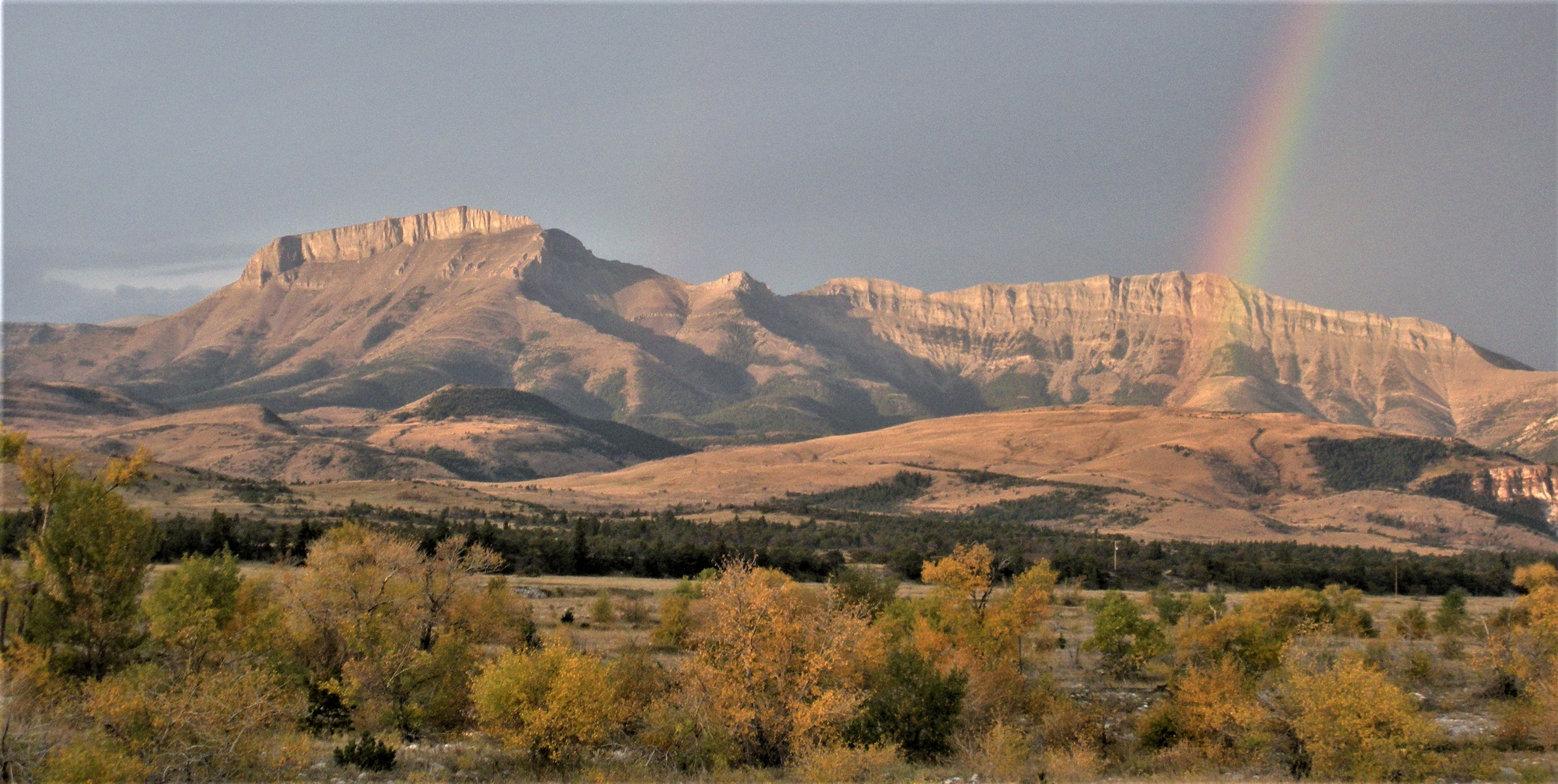
Ear Mountain (left) from the east
