= KUDI =

Radio station in Choteau, Montana

- Choteau, Montana; United States
- Frequency: 88.7 MHz
- Branding: "New Life Radio"

Programming
- Format: Christian contemporary

Ownership
- Owner: Hi-Line Radio Fellowship, Inc.

Technical information
- Licensing authority: FCC
- Facility ID: 176530
- Class: A
- ERP: 330 watts
- HAAT: 138 metres (453 ft)
- Transmitter coordinates: 47°45′21″N 112°09′42″W

Links
- Public license information: Public file; LMS
- Webcast: Listen Live

KUDI (88.7 FM) is a radio station licensed to serve the community of Choteau, Montana. As of August 2022, the station is owned by Hi-Line Radio Fellowship, Inc., and airs a Christian contemporary format.

== History ==
The KUDI call sign was assigned by the FCC on November 10, 2008, to New Life Community Church in Choteau, Montana. (They had previously been used between 1957 and 1976 on 1450 AM in Great Falls.) The new station, located at 88.7 on the FM band, adopted a Christian radio format for talk, news, religious programming, and contemporary Christian music.

On April 14, New Life Community Church donated the call letters, station, and all station assets to MOTA Ministries of Fairfield, Montana. The transaction was consummated on December 4, 2019.

Effective August 2, 2022, MOTA Ministries sold KUDI to Hi-Line Radio Fellowship, Inc. for $15,000.
