= Cracon du Nez (Montana) =

Coordinates: 47°52′31.50″N 110°35′50.94″W

The Cracon du Nez (also known as Gross Condunez) occasionally also misspelled (on Google Maps and Google Earth) as the Crocon du Nez, is a sharp sided ridge that divides the Teton River and the Missouri River in Chouteau County, Montana (47.874719° -110.598212°), at a point where the increasing erosion at a large bend of the Missouri River has caused the two rivers to be a mere third of a mile (about 650 yards) apart. The Cracon du Nez ridge is an example of Missouri River stream bank erosion developing toward a future "stream capture" of the Teton River flow. A trail runs along the top of the ridge, where in 1865 Little Dog, a chief of the Piegan Blackfoot tribe was ambushed and killed by rebellious and jealous warriors from his own Piegan band. An abandoned railroad tunnel runs under the ridge, part of the former Montana Central Railway branch line of the Great Northern railroad running from Havre to Fort Benton, Great Falls, Helena and Butte. U.S. Highway 87 passes by the ridge and allows the traveler to see the Cracon du Nez. The name is derived from the French and means bridge of the nose, and was probably given by the French boatmen who comprised keelboat crews in the fur trade in the upper Missouri River in Montana during the early decades of the 1800s.

== Name ==
The name "Cracon du Nez" also called the "Gross Condunez" is derived from the French and is translates to the "bridge of the nose" or "large nose". The name is attributed to French boatmen who commonly comprised keelboat crews traveling on the upper Missouri River in the very early days of the fur trade (the first decades of the 1800s).

== Geography and geology of the Cracon du Nez ==
The Cracon du Nez is a ridge located between the Missouri and Teton Rivers at a site that is 9 river miles below Fort Benton, Montana on the Missouri River.

The remarkable feature of this ridge is that the Teton and the Missouri Rivers are both flowing eastward in parallel valleys, and at this point the Missouri bends toward the Teton valley until the two rivers are only about 650 yards (a third of a mile) apart (measured in a straight line). At this point, the Missouri River water is at an elevation of about 2600 feet, but the waters of the Teton River are higher, at an elevation of 2640 feet. The top of the ridge is about 2750 feet.

The sharp sided ridge keeps the two rivers apart. However, the course of the Missouri is a sharp bend toward the north, toward the valley of the Teton River, causing the very strong Missouri River current to be forcefully directed toward the Cracon du Nez ridge on the river's north bank, resulting in aggressive undercutting and eroding of the ridge separating the two rivers. The Cracon du Nez ridge is of a soft clay substance. As a consequence, the Missouri river is causing the entire hillside below the main ridge to be undergoing slumping and sliding into the Missouri River.

Unless the Missouri River changes course, its current will eventually wear away the ridge over many years, and at that time the Teton River, being at a higher elevation, will be diverted into the Missouri River in a process called "stream capture", or "stream piracy" by geologists.

After flowing against the ridge of the Cracon du Nez, the Missouri River turns back and continues in a serpentine fashion to the east until river mile 22, at which time the Marias joins the Missouri. The Teton River also flows eastward in its valley in a meandering fashion for about 8 more river miles (about 6 miles in a straight line) until it empties into the Marias River, which then flows into the Missouri River in an 1 additional river mile.

== History events at the Cracon du Nez ==
=== Lewis and Clark ===
The Lewis and Clark expedition camped near here on 11 June 1805. They called the Teton the Tansey River, a name that did not stick.

=== James Willard Schultz and the death of Little Dog, Piegan Chief ===
In his book "Floating on the Missouri" James Willard Schultz reports that the ridge was a site of an event critical in Piegan history. He states that along the crest of the Cracon du Nez ridge ran an old Indian trail. Here in 1865 the Piegan Chief, "Little Dog", met his death, murdered by his own people. The Piegans were bitter enemies of the whites, and while they traded at the fur trading forts along the Missouri River, they ranged as far south as the California Trail in search of scalps and plunder. Of the whole Piegan/Blackfoot tribe only Little Dog was the white man's friend and he tried to maintain peace with them, demanding that his Piegan warriors not kill whites, and at times even killing one or two of the most bloodthirsty Piegans who appeared to defy him. Little Dog was a favorite of the factor at the fort of the American Fur Company who gave him presents. Little Dog's Piegan warriors not only feared him as he ruled them with an iron hand, but they were also jealous of the many favors and gifts showered on him. One day four or five of the boldest warriors held a secret counsel and determined that if the tribe were to maintain their record for scalps and plunder, they must kill the chief. The Piegan camp was at the mouth of the Marias River, located to the east of the Cracon du Nez ridge, and the warriors knew the chief was visiting the factor at his fort up river to the west, and so he would have to return by the trail along the ridge of the Cracon du Nez. There they lay in wait for him. "At dusk he came riding leisurely along, humming his favorite war song. As one man they leveled their rifles and fired at thim, and he fell from his horse without a cry or groan, stone dead. Strange to related, every one of his murderers died within a year; some in battle, some by disease, and one by a fall running buffalo." Relieved from the restraint of Little Dog's unbending will, Schultz reports the Piegan returned to a systematic warfare against lone trappers and hunters, the "woodhawks" along the river, travelers on the trails and others. According to Schultz, these escalation of events eventually led to Col. E.M. Baker and his two companies of infantry to massacre a village of Piegans on the Marias River, (The Marias Massacre).

James Willard's Schultz tale of "Little Dog" may be taken as having a reliable basis in truth, as he made the comments while floating down the Missouri River in a boat, accompanied by his Blackfoot Piegan wife, who was the niece of Chief "Little Dog".

== Abandoned railroad grade through the ridge ==
The tunnel of an abandoned railroad passes under the ridge. The tunnel is part of the abandoned grade of the Montana Central Railway. This was a branch line off the former Great Northern Railway (later absorbed into the Burlington Northern Santa Fe Railroad or BNSF), as it left the main line at Havre and ran to Fort Benton, and on to Great Falls, Helena, with a terminus in the mining city of Butte, Montana. This line was built in order to allow ore from the different Butte mines (and particularly those not affiliated with Anaconda and its smelter) to be brought through Helena to Great Falls where the multiple dams on the Missouri River generated electric current used in plants to reduce and refine the ore, and the connecting rail road line then allowed the resulting products to be conveyed to Havre, when they went either east or west to the industrial centers on the east or west coast of the U.S. traveling on the Great Northern, also known as "Jim Hill's Big Railroad".

== Visiting the site today ==
Between Fort Benton, Montana and Havre, Montana U.S. Highway 87 passes down the Teton Valley in the local of the Cracon du Nez, passing between the ridge and the Teton River. From this highway there is an excellent view of the sharp ridge from the north (Teton Valley side).
