= Mount Frazier (Montana) =

Mountain in Montana, United States

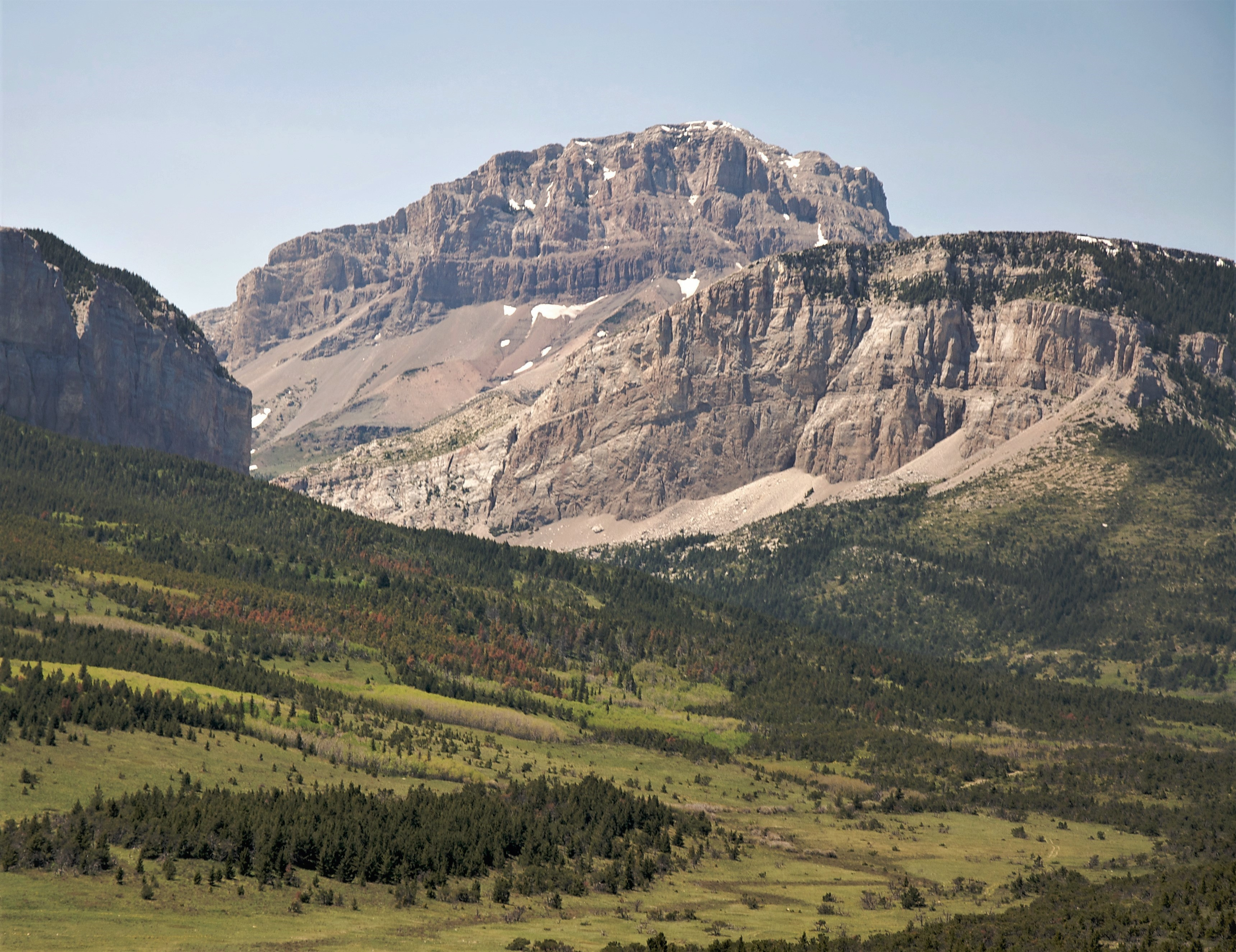
- East aspect

Highest point
- Elevation: 8,315 ft (2,534 m)
- Prominence: 1,315 ft (401 m)
- Parent peak: Peak 8333
- Isolation: 3.26 mi (5.25 km)
- Coordinates: 48°01′04″N 112°45′07″W

Geography
- Location within Montana Location within the United States
- Location: Teton County, Montana, U.S.
- Parent range: Rocky Mountains; Rocky Mountain Front
- Topo map: USGS Walling Reef

Geology
- Rock type: Limestone

Climbing
- Easiest route: West ridge class 2

Mount Frazier is an 8,315-foot (2,534-metre) mountain summit located in Teton County of the U.S. state of Montana.

== Description ==
Mount Frazier is located along the Rocky Mountain Front, which is a subset of the Rocky Mountains. It is situated seven miles east of the Continental Divide, along the Bob Marshall Wilderness boundary, on land managed by Lewis and Clark National Forest. The nearest town is Choteau, 30 miles to the southeast, and Old Man of the Hills is 2.6 miles to the north-northwest. Precipitation runoff from the mountain drains into Blackleaf Creek and Dupuyer Creek, and eventually makes its way to the Missouri River. Topographic relief is significant as the summit rises 2,700 feet (820 meters) above the South Fork of Dupuyer Creek in one mile (1.6 km).

== Geology ==
Mount Frazier is composed of sedimentary rock laid down during the Precambrian to Jurassic periods. Formed in shallow seas, this sedimentary rock was pushed east and over the top of younger rock during the Sevier orogeny. The Lewis Overthrust extends over 280 miles (450 km) from Mount Kidd in Alberta, south to Steamboat Mountain which is located 53 miles south of Mount Frazier, which places Mount Frazier within the southern part of the Lewis Overthrust.

== Climate ==
Based on the Köppen climate classification, Mount Frazier has an alpine subarctic climate characterized by long, usually very cold winters, and mild to warm summers. Winter temperatures can drop below −10 °F with wind chill factors below −30 °F.

== See also ==
- Geology of the Rocky Mountains
