= Choteau Airport =

Airport in Montana, United States

- IATA: none; ICAO: KCII; FAA LID: CII

Summary
- Airport type: Public
- Owner: Choteau City and Teton County
- Serves: Choteau, Montana
- Elevation AMSL: 3,947 ft (1,203 m)
- Coordinates: 47°49′42″N 112°10′06″W
- Interactive map of Choteau Airport

Runways
Direction	Length		Surface
Direction	ft	m	Surface
5/23	3,700	1,128	Asphalt
14/32	5,000	1,524	Asphalt

Statistics (2011)
- Aircraft operations: 3,100
- Based aircraft: 12
- Source: Federal Aviation Administration

Choteau Airport (ICAO: KCII, FAA LID: CII) is a public use airport located one nautical mile (2 km) northeast of the central business district of Choteau, a city in Teton County, Montana, United States. The airport is owned by the city and county. It is included in the National Plan of Integrated Airport Systems for 2011–2015, which categorized it as a general aviation airport.

Although many U.S. airports use the same three-letter location identifier for the FAA and IATA, this facility is assigned CII by the FAA but has no designation from the IATA.

== Facilities and aircraft ==
Choteau Airport covers an area of 495 acres (200 ha) at an elevation of 3,947 feet (1,203 m) above mean sea level. It has two asphalt paved runways: 14/32 is 5,000 by 75 feet (1,524 x 23 m) and 5/23 is 3,700 by 60 feet (1,128 x 18 m).

For the 12-month period ending July 22, 2011, the airport had 3,100 aircraft operations, an average of 258 per month: 87% general aviation, 10% air taxi, and 3% military. At that time there were 12 aircraft based at this airport: 92% single-engine, and 8% ultralight.

== See also ==
- List of airports in Montana
