= Castle Reef Dolomite =

Ggeologic formation in Montana, US

- Stratigraphic range: Carboniferous
- Type: Formation

Location
- Region: Montana
- Country: United States

The Castle Reef Dolomite is a geologic formation in Montana. It preserves fossils dating back to the Carboniferous period. Castle Reef is the type locality.

== See also ==
- List of fossiliferous stratigraphic units in Montana
- Paleontology in Montana
