= Priest Butte Lake =

Lake near Choteau, Montana

- Location: Near Choteau
- Coordinates: 47.758°N 112.112°W
- Type: Lake
- Etymology: Priest Butte
- Surface area: 475.9 acres (192.6 ha)
- Surface elevation: 3,798.2 feet (1,157.7 m)

Location
- Interactive map of Priest Butte Lake

Priest Butte Lake is a lake in the U.S. state of Montana in Teton County between Fairfield and Choteau. The lake is part of the Freezout Lake Wildlife Management Area managed by Montana Department of Fish, Wildlife and Parks.

== History ==
Priest Butte Lake was added following the formation of the Freezout Lake Wildlife Management Area in 1953.

== Species ==
Seven species of fish have been found and documented in the lake by Montana Department of Fish, Wildlife and Parks: brassy minnow, brook stickleback, common carp, fathead minnow, lake chub, white sucker and yellow perch.

== See also ==
- Choteau Montana
- Freezeout Lake
- US-89
- Priest Butte
- Fairfield, Montana
