= Freezeout Lake =

Lake in Montana, United States

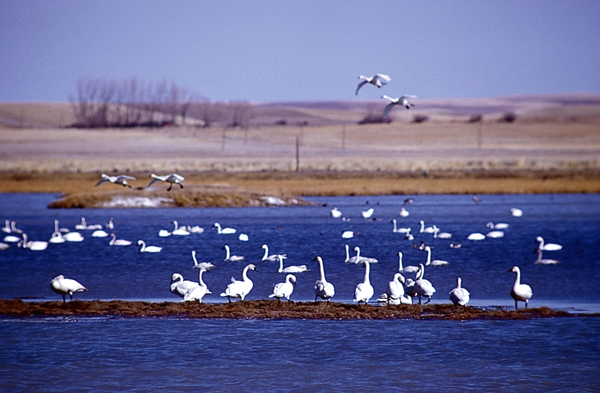
- Waterfowl on the lake
- Interactive map of Freezeout Lake
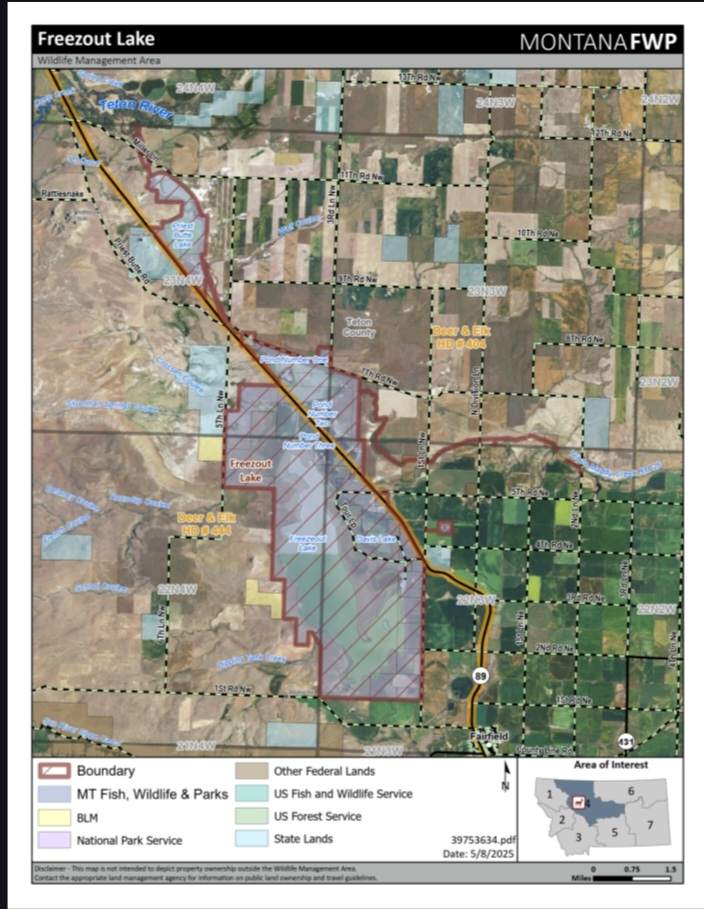
- A PDF of Freezout Lake Wildlife Management Area
- Location: Between Fairfield and Choteau, Montana
- Coordinates: 47.661°N 112.053°W
- Type: Lake
- Etymology: See History Section
- Primary inflows: Irrigation ditches and natural sources
- Managing agency: Montana Department of Fish, Wildlife and Parks
- Surface elevation: 3,795 ft (1,157 m)
- References: https://myfwp.mt.gov/fwpPub/landsMgmt/siteDetail.action?lmsId=39753634

Freezeout Lake is a waterbody located in the U.S. state of Montana, in Teton County between Fairfield and Choteau. Both the lake and the surrounding Freezout Lake Wildlife Management Area are managed by Montana Department of Fish, Wildlife and Parks. The lake is known for its waterfowl population and management, as well as its opportunities for hunting and birdwatching.

The lake's water levels are kept consistent by the irrigation ditches and natural sources that feed the lake. In addition to helping waterfowl by keeping water levels steady, islands were made to assist waterfowl in making nesting and roosting sites.

== History ==
No one knows the exact origin of the lake's name, but many possibilites have been noted by Montana Fish, Wildlife and Parks. One suggestion is that soldiers at Fort Shaw were caught in a blizzard, and because of the incident the area became known as "Freezout Flat". Another possible namesake could be what the locals called an unsuccessful attempt to farm or ranch on the flat—a "freezeout". Lastly, a stage station established in 1885, known as "Camp Freezout" or "Freezout Way Station" (from freezeout, a form of poker played there), could also have been a possible namesake.

Before the lake was acquired by Montana Fish, Wildlife and Parks, it had been a natural sump and basin. It was often noted that the lake would go dry. However, when the Greenfield Irrigation District was formed, the water levels increased due to the irrigation water in addition to natural sources. During this time, it was noted that nearby railroad tracks and roads would flood. The lake was bought in 1953 by Montana Fish, Wildlife and Parks and formed into the Freezout Lake Wildlife Management Area. In addition to the lake, surrounding ponds and Priest Butte Lake were added later to the area. The three lakes in the wildlife management area are Freezeout Lake, Davis Lake, and Priest Butte Lake; the six unnamed ponds are numbered 1–6.

== Species ==
Freezeout Lake contains a variety of fish, waterfowl, and mammal species.

The most common waterfowl species at Freezeout Lake include mallard, gadwall, northern shoveler, teal species, northern pintail, American wigeon, Canada goose and American coot.

Nine fish species have been reported as being found in Freezeout Lake by Montana Fish, Wildlife and Parks: brassy minnow, brook stickleback, common carp, fathead minnow, lake chub, longnose dace, rainbow trout, white sucker, and yellow perch. Many mammals have been reported and are allowed to be hunted in the area by licensed trappers. Those include muskrats, mink, raccoons, foxes, coyotes, and skunks.

== Climate concerns ==
Due to low snowpack since 2025, the lake's water level has been abnormally low. Consequently, migratory waterfowl are moving on more quickly, and there is a below-average number of birds.

== Special events ==
- Wild Wings – An annual birding event every March during spring migration

== See also ==
- Priest Butte
