= Priest Butte =

Mountain in Montana, United States

Preist Butte
- Summit Elevation: 4,209.6 feet/1283 meters
- Etymology: A Jesuit Mission further north of Choteau
- Coordinates: 47°45′09″N 112°07′52″W
- Type: Butte

Priest Butte is a butte in Teton County in the U.S. state of Montana. It is located west of Priest Butte Lake on US-89 between Fairfield and Choteau.

== History ==
Priest Butte was named after a Jesuit Mission further north of Choteau on the Blackfeet Indian Reservation. Development began around the butte when some Jesuit priests built a log cabin in 1859 at the base to evangelize the Blackfeet Indians in the area. Although the attempt was unsuccessful, the Jesuits still used the butte, and it was even noted during this time that local Jesuit Easter services would be done on top of the butte. However, they vacated the butte in 1860. Later, in 1893 when the county was building the Teton County Courthouse, stone was taken from a quarry at the top to build the building. However, that courthouse burnt down in 1897 and a new one was later built. The original crosses were erected in 1942 and were made of wood. However, in 1961, the crosses were replaced with iron ones. Most recently in 2002, steel crosses were added due to rust on the previous iron ones. The project also added wooden steps for easier hiking access.

== Geology ==
Priest Butte, unlike many buttes in the area, is made of sandstone. The east side of the butte (side on US-89) is a steep drop-off, and rocky shelves of shale can be seen at the top along with fossilized dinosaur tracks.The west side, (side on Priest Butte Road) unlike the east side, is very gradual, and is grazed by cattle and filled with vegetation. The butte has four general peaks that can be accessed by hikers.

== Access ==
The butte can be accessed by a hiking trail on Priest Butte Road. The butte is located on state land, but the butte and its trails can be accessed via a gate.

== Twin butte ==
Rattlesnake Butte is Priest Butte's twin butte.
