= Sawtooth Range (Montana) =

Mountain range in Teton County, Montana

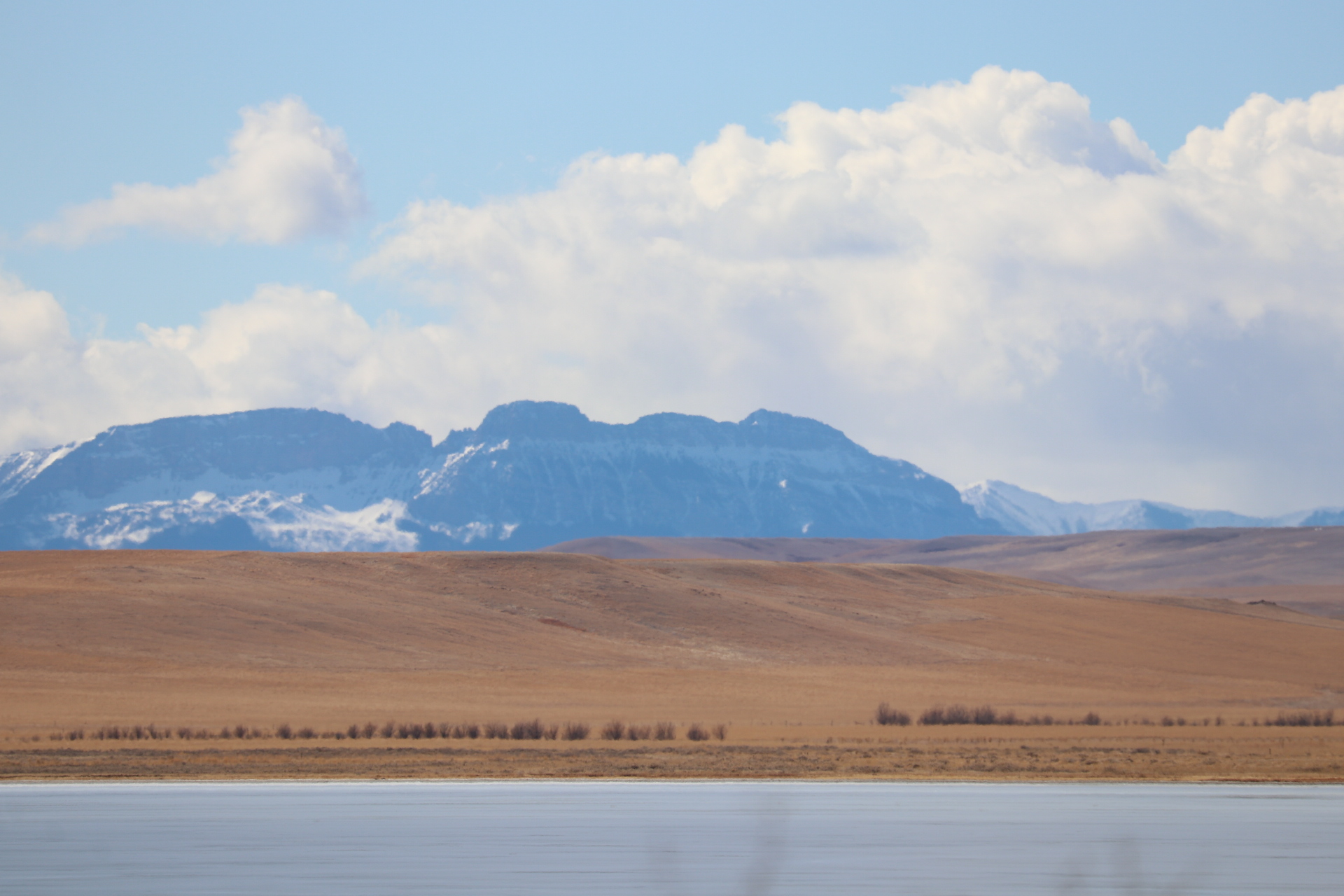

Highest point
- Elevation: 7,877 ft (2,401 m)
- Coordinates: 47°48′00″N 112°47′37″W

Geography
- Location within Montana
- Country: United States
- State: Montana

The Sawtooth Range, el. 7,877 feet (2,401 m), is a small mountain range west of Augusta, Montana, in Teton County, Montana. Its highest peaks are Rocky Mountain at 9,392 feet, Mount Wright, and Old Baldy

== See also ==
- List of mountain ranges in Montana
- Old Baldy (Montana)
