= Teton River (Montana) =

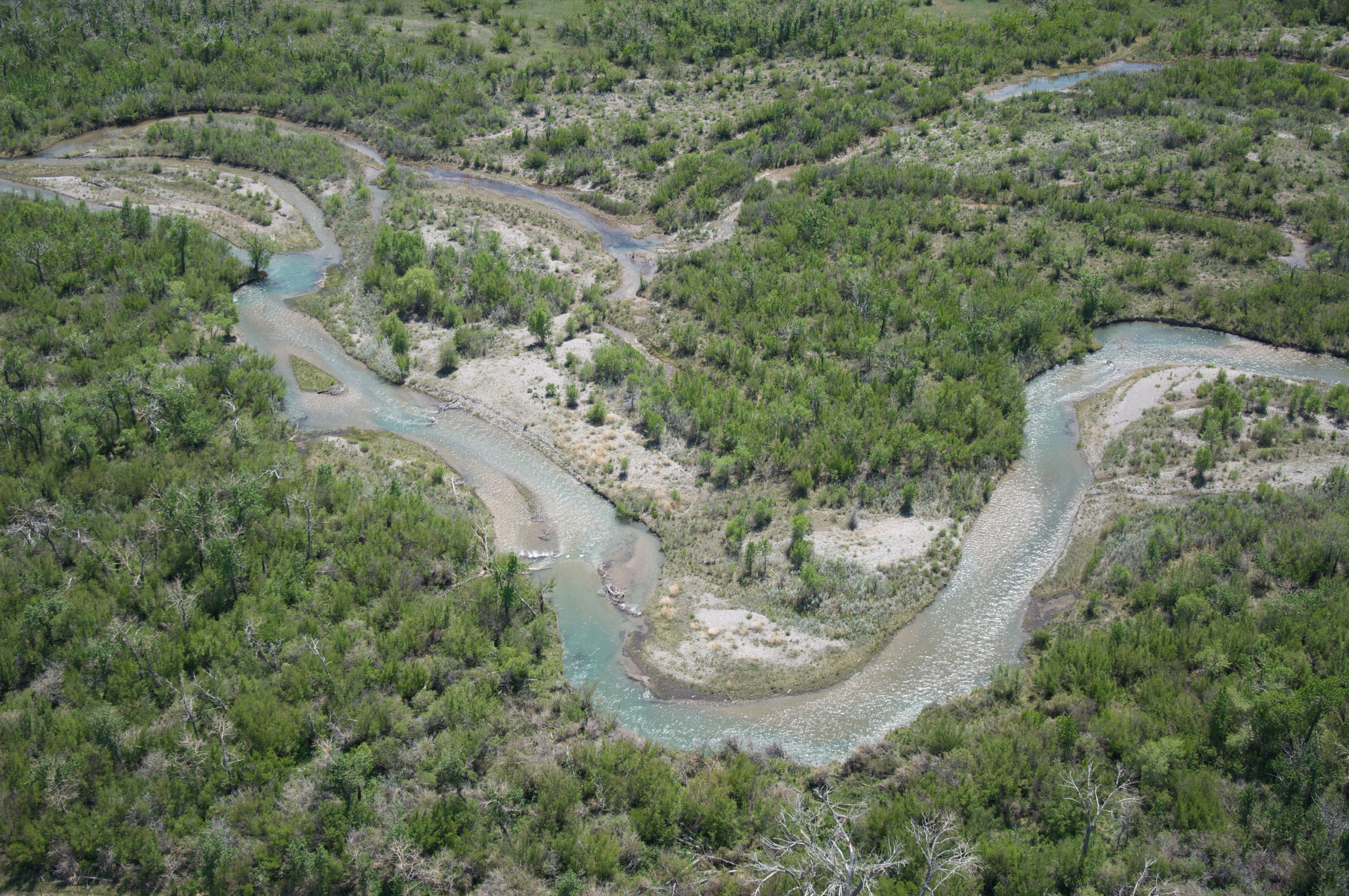

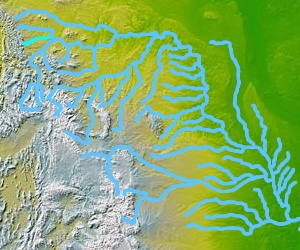
- The Teton River in Montana

Location
- Country: Chouteau and Teton County, Montana

Physical characteristics
- Source
  - coordinates: 47°52′58″N 112°37′59″W
- Mouth
  - coordinates: 47°55′55″N 110°30′32″W
  - elevation: 2,562 feet (781 m)
- Discharge
  - location: Loma, Montana
  - average: 66 cu/ft. per sec.

Basin features
- River system: Missouri River

The Teton River (pronounced "TEE-taan") is located in northwestern Montana, in the Western United States The ~ 150 miles (240 km) long river is a tributary of the Marias River. Its watershed is within Teton County and Chouteau County, Montana.

== Course ==
The Teton River headwaters are in the southern Lewis Range of the Rocky Mountains at the continental divide, in the Lewis and Clark National Forest.

It flows southeast, then east, down from the Lewis mountains and across Teton County, past the town of Choteau. It is joined by Muddy Creek and Deep Creek. It continues flowing east, passing near Fort Benton to its confluence with the Marias River. This occurs only 3 miles (4.8 km) upstream of the Marias' confluence with the Missouri River.

== Variant names ==
The Teton River has also been known as the:

- Breast River
- Fancy River
- Mone-e-kis, Monekis
- Rose River
- Tansey River
- Tansy River, Tanzey River, or Tanzy River

== See also ==
- List of rivers of Montana
- Montana Stream Access Law
- Cracon Du Nez
