= Choteau, Montana =

City in Montana, United States

- City
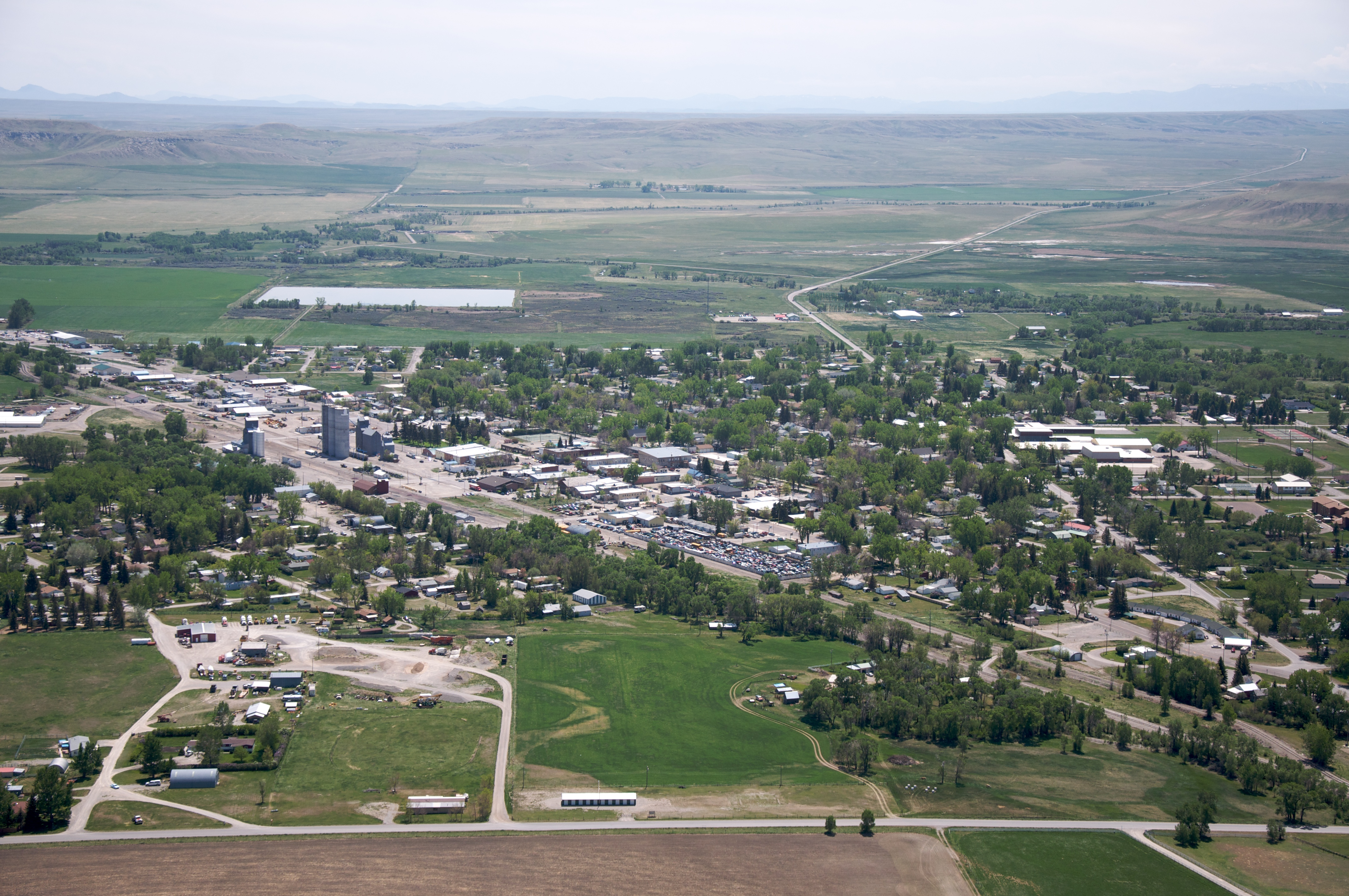
- Aerial view of Choteau

- Location of Choteau, Montana

- Location in the United States
- Coordinates: 47°48′49″N 112°10′46″W
- Country: United States
- State: Montana
- County: Teton

Area
  - Total: 1.46 sq mi (3.77 km^{2})
  - Land: 1.46 sq mi (3.77 km^{2})
  - Water: 0 sq mi (0.00 km^{2})
- Elevation: 3,816 ft (1,163 m)

Population (2020)
  - Total: 1,721
  - Density: 1,182.7/sq mi (456.63/km^{2})
- Time zone: UTC-7 (Mountain (MST))
  - Summer (DST): UTC-6 (MDT)
- ZIP code: 59422
- Area code: 406
- FIPS code: 30-14650
- GNIS feature ID: 2409458
- Website: choteaumt.org

Choteau (/ˈʃoʊtoʊ/ SHOH-toh) is a city in and the county seat of Teton County, Montana, United States. The population was 1,721 at the 2020 census.

== History ==
Choteau is named after French fur merchant, trader and explorer Pierre Chouteau Jr., who is also the namesake of Chouteau County, Montana. Fort Pierre, South Dakota, and Pierre, South Dakota, are also named after Chouteau. Originally a trading post established by A. B. Hamilton in 1873, the town was platted in 1883.

In 2008, school authorities in Choteau made national news headlines by canceling a speaking engagement by Nobel laureate climate researcher Steve Running, who was scheduled to speak to local high school students.

== Geography ==
According to the United States Census Bureau, the city has an area of 1.83 square miles (4.74 km^{2}), all land.

The Teton River runs nearby, although for some distance upstream of Choteau it is dry during much of the year.

Being located along the Rocky Mountain Front, Choteau is near several mountains. Some of them are Mount Frazier, Old Baldy, and Rocky Mountain. The Ear Mountain Wildlife Management Area seeks to protect local wildlife, especially mule deer and bighorn sheep.

About 15 miles (24 km) west is the Teton Pass Ski Area. The area has downhill skiing, backcountry skiing, and snowmobile trails.

Just to the south is Freezout Lake, a bird watcher's paradise. Hundreds of thousands of birds gather at the lake during peak migration. 230 species have been documented at the lake.

=== Climate ===
Choteau experiences a semi-arid climate (Köppen BSk) with cold, dry winters and warm, more humid summers.

Climate data for Choteau, Montana, 1991–2020 normals, extremes 1893–present
Month	Jan	Feb	Mar	Apr	May	Jun	Jul	Aug	Sep	Oct	Nov	Dec	Year
Record high °F (°C)	79 (26)	73 (23)	82 (28)	86 (30)	92 (33)	98 (37)	105 (41)	106 (41)	96 (36)	90 (32)	80 (27)	72 (22)	106 (41)
Mean maximum °F (°C)	58.4 (14.7)	58.4 (14.7)	65.8 (18.8)	74.0 (23.3)	81.5 (27.5)	86.0 (30.0)	93.0 (33.9)	91.8 (33.2)	87.2 (30.7)	78.1 (25.6)	66.0 (18.9)	57.3 (14.1)	93.2 (34.0)
Mean daily maximum °F (°C)	37.4 (3.0)	38.9 (3.8)	47.0 (8.3)	55.8 (13.2)	65.1 (18.4)	72.3 (22.4)	82.0 (27.8)	81.0 (27.2)	71.6 (22.0)	58.0 (14.4)	45.0 (7.2)	37.4 (3.0)	57.6 (14.2)
Daily mean °F (°C)	25.4 (−3.7)	26.5 (−3.1)	34.0 (1.1)	42.4 (5.8)	51.1 (10.6)	58.2 (14.6)	65.2 (18.4)	64.0 (17.8)	55.7 (13.2)	44.3 (6.8)	33.3 (0.7)	26.0 (−3.3)	43.8 (6.6)
Mean daily minimum °F (°C)	13.4 (−10.3)	14.2 (−9.9)	21.0 (−6.1)	28.9 (−1.7)	37.0 (2.8)	44.1 (6.7)	48.3 (9.1)	46.9 (8.3)	39.8 (4.3)	30.6 (−0.8)	21.6 (−5.8)	14.6 (−9.7)	30.0 (−1.1)
Mean minimum °F (°C)	−16.1 (−26.7)	−11.3 (−24.1)	−4.0 (−20.0)	11.7 (−11.3)	24.0 (−4.4)	33.4 (0.8)	38.8 (3.8)	37.1 (2.8)	26.8 (−2.9)	10.0 (−12.2)	−3.6 (−19.8)	−12.0 (−24.4)	−24.8 (−31.6)
Record low °F (°C)	−44 (−42)	−50 (−46)	−36 (−38)	−16 (−27)	8 (−13)	28 (−2)	28 (−2)	28 (−2)	−5 (−21)	−15 (−26)	−30 (−34)	−43 (−42)	−50 (−46)
Average precipitation inches (mm)	0.28 (7.1)	0.41 (10)	0.52 (13)	1.15 (29)	2.14 (54)	2.75 (70)	0.99 (25)	1.06 (27)	1.16 (29)	0.74 (19)	0.41 (10)	0.32 (8.1)	11.93 (301.2)
Average snowfall inches (cm)	6.4 (16)	7.6 (19)	8.1 (21)	6.6 (17)	1.4 (3.6)	0.0 (0.0)	0.0 (0.0)	0.0 (0.0)	0.9 (2.3)	4.2 (11)	6.9 (18)	5.4 (14)	47.5 (121.9)
Average precipitation days (≥ 0.01 in)	4.7	6.2	5.9	7.6	8.9	10.8	6.0	7.0	6.0	6.1	5.2	4.8	79.2
Average snowy days (≥ 0.1 in)	5.4	6.0	4.9	3.1	0.6	0.0	0.0	0.0	0.3	2.1	4.4	5.3	32.1
Source 1: NOAA
Source 2: National Weather Service

== Demographics ==
Historical population
Census	Pop.	Note	%±
1920	1,043		—
1930	926		−11.2%
1940	1,181		27.5%
1950	1,618		37.0%
1960	1,966		21.5%
1970	1,586		−19.3%
1980	1,798		13.4%
1990	1,741		−3.2%
2000	1,781		2.3%
2010	1,684		−5.4%
2020	1,721		2.2%
U.S. Decennial Census

=== 2020 census ===
As of the 2020 census, Choteau had a population of 1,721. The median age was 48.0 years. 21.3% of residents were under the age of 18 and 27.5% of residents were 65 years of age or older. For every 100 females there were 90.2 males, and for every 100 females age 18 and over there were 89.4 males age 18 and over.

0.0% of residents lived in urban areas, while 100.0% lived in rural areas.

There were 771 households in Choteau, of which 24.1% had children under the age of 18 living in them. Of all households, 45.0% were married-couple households, 19.8% were households with a male householder and no spouse or partner present, and 30.6% were households with a female householder and no spouse or partner present. About 38.9% of all households were made up of individuals and 21.8% had someone living alone who was 65 years of age or older.

There were 898 housing units, of which 14.1% were vacant. The homeowner vacancy rate was 1.4% and the rental vacancy rate was 14.5%.

Racial composition as of the 2020 census
Race	Number	Percent
White	1,541	89.5%
Black or African American	5	0.3%
American Indian and Alaska Native	43	2.5%
Asian	4	0.2%
Native Hawaiian and Other Pacific Islander	3	0.2%
Some other race	8	0.5%
Two or more races	117	6.8%
Hispanic or Latino (of any race)	22	1.3%

=== 2010 census ===
As of the census of 2010, there were 1,684 people, 791 households, and 441 families residing in the city. The population density was 920.2 inhabitants per square mile (355.3/km^{2}). There were 888 housing units at an average density of 485.2 per square mile (187.3/km^{2}). The racial makeup of the city was 95.0% White, 2.1% Native American, 0.2% Asian, 0.1% Pacific Islander, 0.3% from other races, and 2.3% from two or more races. Hispanic or Latino people of any race were 1.7% of the population.

There were 791 households, of which 21.9% had children under the age of 18 living with them, 45.8% were married couples living together, 6.8% had a female householder with no husband present, 3.2% had a male householder with no wife present, and 44.2% were non-families. 39.6% of all households were made up of individuals, and 20% had someone living alone who was 65 years of age or older. The average household size was 2.04 and the average family size was 2.75.

The median age in the city was 49.1 years. 19.5% of residents were under the age of 18; 5.1% were between the ages of 18 and 24; 19.8% were from 25 to 44; 29.8% were from 45 to 64; and 25.8% were 65 years of age or older. The gender makeup of the city was 46.4% male and 53.6% female.

=== 2000 census ===
As of the census of 2000, there were 1,781 people, 807 households, and 464 families residing in the city. The population density was 994.3 people per square mile (383.9/km^{2}). There were 897 housing units at an average density of 500.8 per square mile (193.4/km^{2}). The racial makeup of the city was 93.94% White, 0.06% African American, 2.92% Native American, 0.11% Asian, 0.22% from other races, and 2.75% from two or more races. Hispanic or Latino people of any race were 1.18% of the population.

There were 807 households, out of which 24.9% had children under the age of 18 living with them, 46.8% were married couples living together, 8.6% had a female householder with no husband present, and 42.4% were non-families. 39.2% of all households were made up of individuals, and 21.9% had someone living alone who was 65 years of age or older. The average household size was 2.13 and the average family size was 2.82.

In the city, the population was spread out, with 22.7% under the age of 18, 4.4% from 18 to 24, 21.4% from 25 to 44, 25.8% from 45 to 64, and 25.7% who were 65 years of age or older. The median age was 46 years. For every 100 females there ware 86.3 males. For every 100 females age 18 and over, there were 80.9 males.

The median income for a household in the city was $25,708, and the median income for a family was $35,655. Males had a median income of $22,429 versus $17,098 for females. The per capita income for the city was $14,999. About 12.7% of families and 17.6% of the population were below the poverty line, including 30.2% of those under the age of 18 and 12.5% of those 65 and older.

== Arts and culture ==
Choteau is part of the Montana Dinosaur Trail. The town is near one of the world's most important paleontology sites, Egg Mountain. The Old Trail Museum in Choteau is home to the Montana state fossil, the hadrosaurid dinosaur known as Maiasaura. The 3-D display can be viewed during the summer operating season. Also showcased is the Egg Mountain find along with a commentary on its significance in paleontology. Besides dinosaurs, the museum has artifacts and information about the Blackfeet and Métis histories, local geology, and local history.

Bynum, 13 miles (21 km) north, is home to the Montana Dinosaur Center. They have a skeletal model of what is believed to be the world's longest dinosaur, a diplodocus. Since 2004, the Montana Dinosaur Center also houses the original remains of Maiasaura that had been found by Marion Brandvold west of Choteau in 1978 and that led to the discovery of Egg Mountain and the coining of the Maiasaura genus.

Choteau/Teton Public Library serves the area.

== Government ==
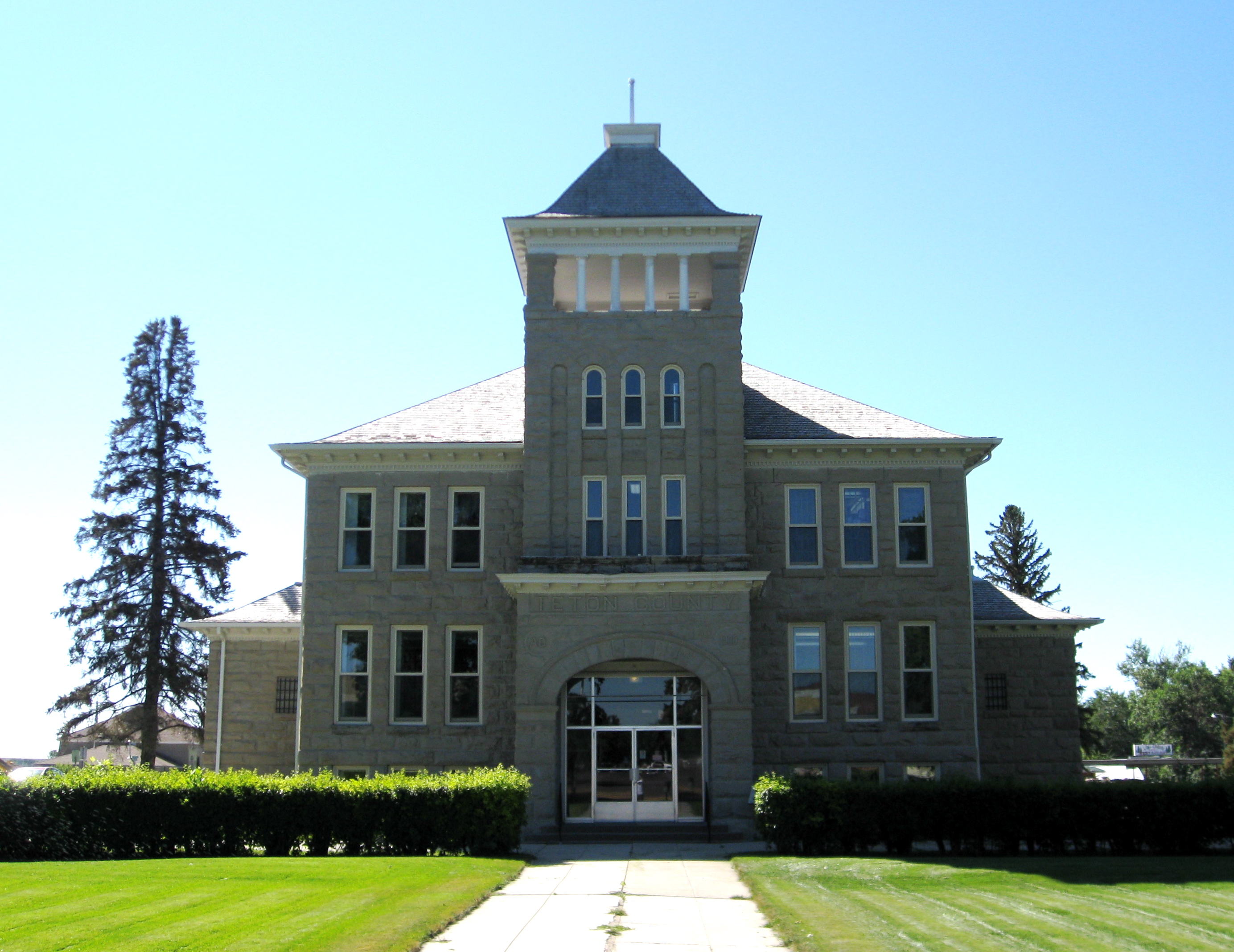
County courthouse in Choteau

Choteau has a mayor-council system of government. In 2023, the mayor was Chris Hindoien. Choteau is split into two wards, each with two councilmembers.

== Education ==
Choteau Public Schools serves all grades of children. The district has two components: Choteau Elementary School District and Choteau High School District.

In 2022, grades K-8 had 240 students with 19.5 full-time equivalency teachers. The high school had 107 students with 10 teachers.

== Sports ==
The school is in class district 1b (Class B and Class C) for every sport but football. The school's mascot is the bulldogs. They have an rivalry against the Fairfield Eagles.

== Media ==
The Choteau Acantha is a newspaper printed weekly or accessed online.

The radio stations KETI-LP and KUDI are licensed in Choteau. Both are Christian stations.

== Infrastructure ==
U.S. Route 89 and 287 converge in town.

Choteau Airport is a public use airport one mile (2 km) northeast of town. The nearest commercial airport is Great Falls International Airport, 60 miles (97 km) away.

Benefis Teton Medical Center provides local medical care.

== Notable people ==
- John Edward Erickson, governor of Montana
- J. Frank Glendon, actor
- A. B. Guthrie Jr., novelist
- David Letterman, late-night talk show host
- Jay Neitz, vision scientist
- J. K. Ralston, western painter
- Flint Rasmussen, rodeo clown
- Jim Waltermire, Montana secretary of state
