= Nilan Reservoir =

Reservoir in Montana, United States

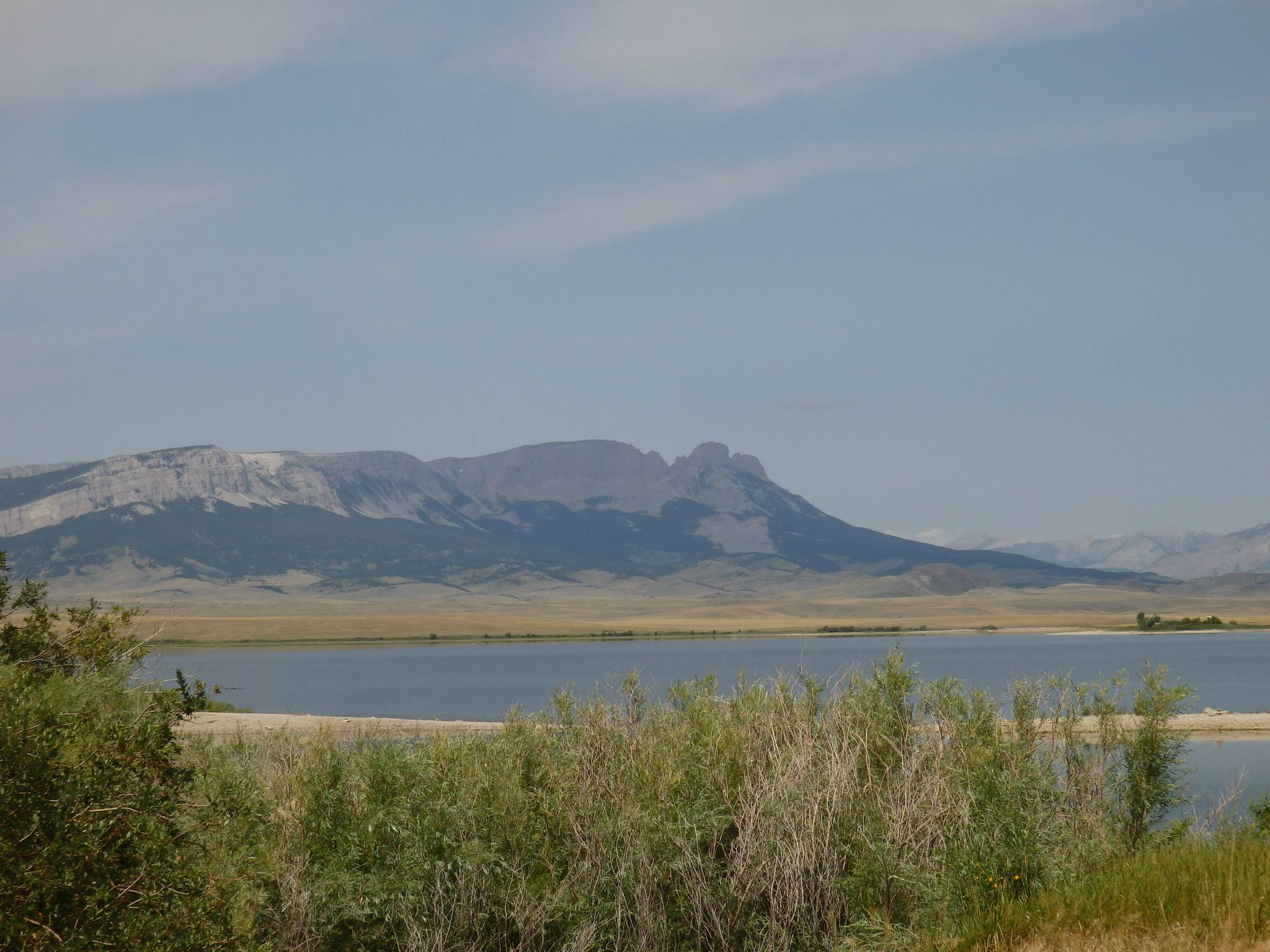
- Nilan Reservoir with Sawtooth Ridge in the background
- Location: Augusta, Montana, United States
- Coordinates: 47.479650°N 112.533852°W
- Etymology: John and Margaret Nilan
- Part of: Sun River
- Primary inflows: Stream
- Primary outflows: Canals
- Surface area: 520.7 acres (210.7 ha)
- Surface elevation: 4,447.4 ft (1,355.6 m)

Location
- Interactive map of Nilan Reservoir

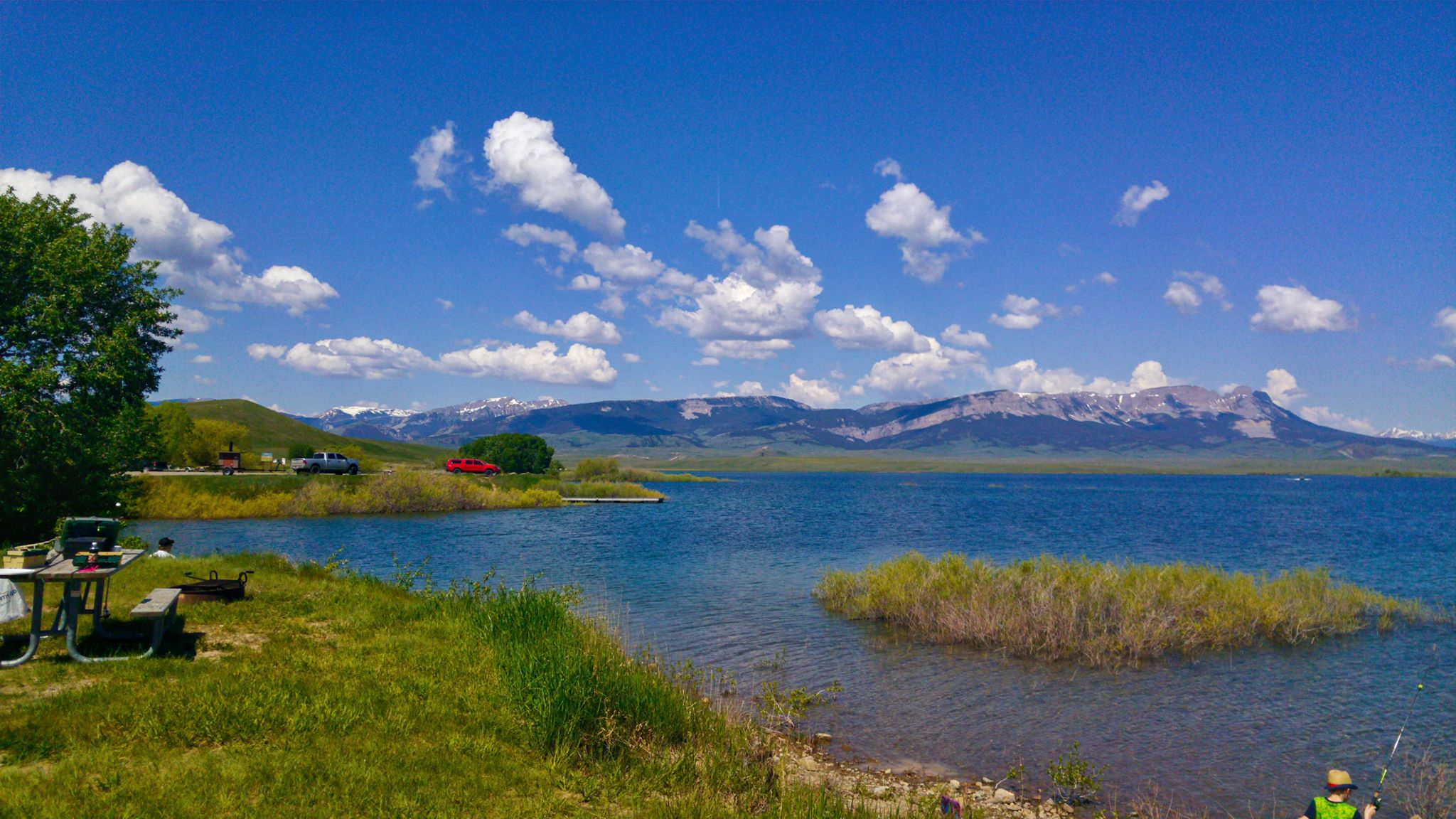
Nilan Reservoir

Nilan Reservoir is a reservoir in Lewis and Clark County, Montana, United States. The reservoir offers irrigation water and recreational opportunities.

== History ==
Nilan Reservoir was created in 1951 for off stream storage. The reservoir was named after John and Margaret Nilan, homesteaders in the area. Soon after construction of the reservoir was completed, the Nilan Water Users Association was formed 1952. The reservoir stayed the same until 1999 when repairs on the reservoir's East Dam to fix sinkholes. Additional repairs were made in 2008, when a new structure and drainage system was instead in the North Dam. Additional sinkhole repairs were made from 2012 to 2020 in the East Dam. The reservoir is still managed by the Nilan Water Users Association, as well as the DNRC and Montana Department of Fish, Wildlife, and Parks.

== Composition ==
Nilan Reservoir contains two dams: North Dam and East Dam. The North Dam is 54 feet high and 530 feet long, with a four feet diameter concrete tunnel and a control tower with 48 inch slide operating gate and 48 inch slide guard gate. The East Dam is an earthfill dam with the exact same tunnel and operating tower to the North Dam.

For recreational purposes, Nilan Reservoir has a fishing access site, restroom, boat launch, and camping area.

== Species ==
Nilan Reservoir contains three species of fish: rainbow trout, brown trout and white sucker.

== Concerns ==
Concerns have arisen with the reservoir because majority of Augusta, Montana and other homesteads and communities are in the flood plain. Other concerns have arisen with the reservoir due to the old condition of the dams.

== See also ==
- Willow Creek Reservoir
- Willow Creek Dam
- Sun River Game Range
- Pishkuhn Reservoir
- Gibson Dam
- Gibson Reservoir
