= Sun River Game Range =

Wildlife management area in Montana, United States

- Sun River Wildife Management Area
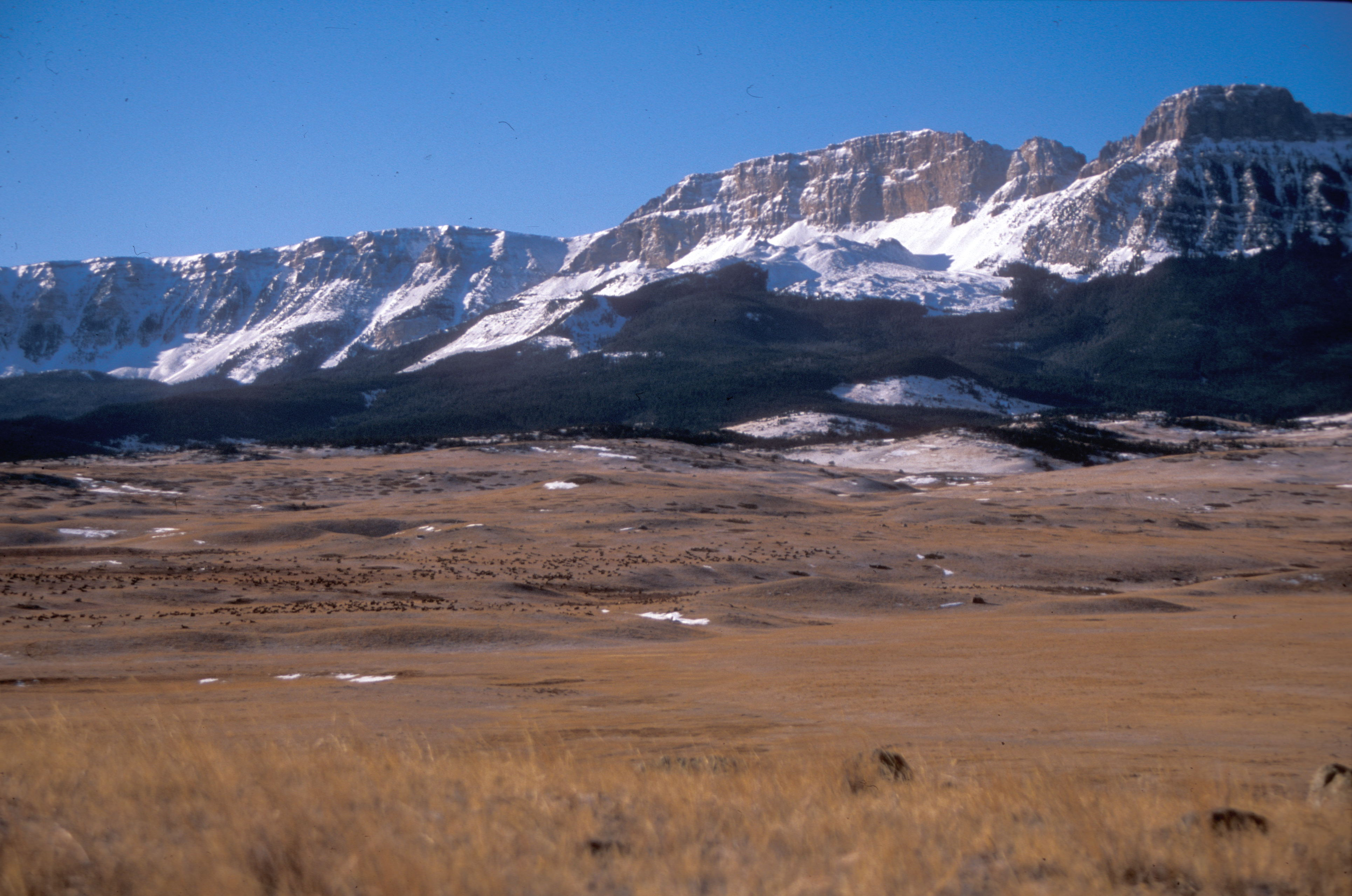
- A picture of the Sun River WMA
- Interactive map of Sun River Game Range
- Nearest city: Augusta, Montana
- Area: 19,744.6 acres (79.904 km^{2})
- Average elevation: 4,962
- Established: 1948
- Named for: Sun River
- Governing body: Montana Department of Fish, Wildlife and Parks

The Sun River Game Range, also known as the Sun River Wildlife Management Area, is a wildlife management area in Lewis and Clark County, Montana. The area is known for its hunting, horseback riding and shed hunting opportunities as well as elk conservation.

== History ==
Before the purchase of the game range the Montana Department of Fish, Wildlife, and Parks had no land to provide the Sun River elk herd for winter usage. Additionally, they did not reach sufficient funds to acquire land. However, concerned farmers Tom Meselt and Carl Malone made the down payment on land in Lewis and Clark County until it could be purchased by the state. Soon, the agency gained enough funds to buy the land and established the game range in 1948. Additional land was purchased every year until 1974. Currently, the area is managed by the state as well as the Rocky Mountain Elk Foundation.

== Species ==
The WMA contains elk, deer, black bears, grizzly bears and other small animals.The game range also contains riparian zones, timber, foothill grassland areas and grass range areas.

The Sun River Game Range is essential for the Sun River elk herd who rely on the area for winter habitat and food. According the state, 95 percent of the herd stay in the WMA during the winter.

== Location ==
To get to the WMA, take the Gibson Reservoir/Sun Canyon Road 3.5 miles, then take the left once arriving to the fork in the road.

== Geography ==
The game range is located on the eastern slope of the Rocky Mountain Front. The WMA contains a variety of different landscape features, including grass ranges, exposed timber, riparian zones, browse meadows, and rocky and barren ground. The area is located near the Sawtooth Ridge and Willow Creek Reservoir.

== See also ==
- Sun River
- Pishkuhn Reservoir
- Gibson Reservoir
- Gibson Dam
