= Elk Creek (Montana) =

Stream in Montana, United States

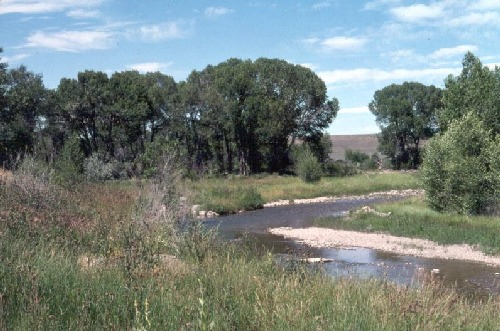
- Elk Creek in 2017

Physical characteristics
- Source
  - coordinates: 47.31694°N 112.64639°W
- 2nd source: Bunch Grass Creek
  - coordinates: 47.32607°N 112.61703°W
- 3rd source: Short Creek
  - coordinates: 47.32400°N 112.60642°W
- 4th source: Cataract Creek
  - coordinates: 47.32393°N 112.60392°W
- 5th source: Bailey Creek
  - coordinates: 47.32536°N 112.58614°W
- Mouth: Sun River
  - location: 47.51881°N 112.29211°W
- Length: 32.513 miles

Basin features
- River system: Sun River
- Waterfalls: Cataract Falls

Elk Creek is a stream in Lewis and Clark County, Montana. The creek provides fishing opportunities and vegetation and water to nearby animals.

== Flow course ==
Elk Creek begins near Steamboat Mountain. It then flows northeast where it joins Cataract Falls and Cataract Creek. It then continues northeast and passes under Montana Highway 435. It continues northeast, flowing through Augusta. After going through Augusta, Elk Creek reaches Gilman, where it joins the Sun River. However, the creek is often dry for most of its course due to an ongoing drought.

== Species ==
The creek contains eight species of fish: brook trout, brown trout, longnose dace, longnose sucker, mottled sculpin, mountain whitefish, rainbow trout and white sucker.

== Extremities ==
Elk Creek has flooded in the early 1900s, and most recently in 2011 and 2018 during heavy periods of rain.

== See also ==
- Gibson Reservoir
- Gibson Dam
- Willow Creek Reservoir
- Willow Creek Dam
- Piskuhn Reservoir
