= Cataract Falls (Montana) =

Waterfall in Montana, United States

- Interactive map of Cataract Falls
- Location: Lewis and Clark County, Montana
- Coordinates: 47.322146°N 112.603772°W
- Elevation: 6,022 ft (1,836 m)
- Number of drops: 1
- Watercourse: Elk Creek, Montana

Cataract Falls is a waterfall in Lewis and Clark County, Montana. The falls and their trail, Elk Creek Trail, offer recreational opportunities such as hiking and fishing.

== Source ==
The waterfall is formed from the confluence of Cataract Creek and Elk Creek.

== Location ==
Cataract Falls is located about 40 miles west of Augusta on Elk Creek Road. The falls is accessed by the Elk Creek Trailhead at the end of Elk Creek Road, and the waterfall is located about a quarter of a mile from the start of the trail. The full trail length is only about half a mile, with little to no difficulty in crossing.

== Activities ==
The waterfall is known for its sightseeing, photography, hiking, and fishing activities year round, as well as ice climbing in the winter.

== See also ==
- Gilman, Montana
- Muddy Creek
