= Fairfield School District 21 =

Public school district

Address
- 13 7th Street Fairfield, Montana Central Montana Teton County, Montana, Montana, 59436; United States of America
- Coordinates: 47.61585971563315°N 111.97601675089334°W

District information
- Type: Public
- Motto: Tradition of Excellence
- Grades: K-12
- Established: 1917
- Superintendent: Dustin Gordon
- Schools: Fairfield Elementary School, Fairfield Middle School, Fairfield High School

Students and staff
- Students: 333
- Faculty: 31
- Teachers: 20
- Student–teacher ratio: 10:1-14:1
- Athletic conference: District 1b
- Colors: Blue, Yellow, White

Other information
- Website: https://www.fairfield.k12.mt.us

The Fairfield School District 21, Fairfield School District, or Fairfield Public Schools is a public school district located in Fairfield,

Montana. The district offers Elementary, Middle School, and High School education for the area.

== History ==
Early homesteaders of Fairfield had a great need to provide education to the area. As a result, a small elementary school was erected in 1910 in a resident's home. The very first teacher was Mr. H.B. Hanson, now residing in Simms. After the first year, 3 other schools were erected. They were referred to as West, Central, and East which was also known as Grasdock. The West school was taught first by Maude Davies Zimmerman and was located north of Fairfield two and half miles. Alma Zimmerman Angle was the first teacher of the Central school which was located 3 miles east and then 3 miles north of the town. The East school was located six miles east and 3 miles north and was taught by Ruth Tallman Wills. All 3 buildings were later moved to the present site of Greenfield Public Schools when the community center devolped in 1935. Shortly after the founding of the 3 schools, the town of Fairfield formed a school that was erected outside of town, but later moved to where it is located now, Main Street. Ruth Beardsley took the position of the first teacher of the school. Later however, due to the town's expansion and increasing population of the town, the school expanded with a Junior High building. That building was erected in 1917, although it did not last long as a school with it being repurposed into a hospital in 1918 for a flu epidemic. Afterwards, from 1920-1922, 8th grade-10th grade were taught in the building. However, during the 1920's, the school struggled economically and sufficient funds had to be donated by the Senior Women's Club from 1923-1928. Funds raised from the club allowed for additonal supplies and for a new well to be dug. Following WW2, the school continued rapidly growing with more students, so barracks purchased from Malstrom Air Force Base allowed for a new elementary school and music department. Since then, only small improvements have been made to the school.

== Elementary School ==
The Fairfield Elementary School consists of the original post-WW2 building with additional improvements including a new sidewalk, a "dry well", playground equipment, and air conditioning. Statistically and according to usnews.com, Fairfield Elementary is ranked number twenty in the state for elementary schools. Additonally, the school has a 62% math (21 ranked in the state) and reading (24 ranked in the state) proficiency, and a total enrollement of 172. Out of total enrollment, 50% of students are male and the other half are female, 97.1% are white, 2.3% are two or more races, .6% is hispanic or latino, and 28% are economically disadvantaged. Those students are taught by 12 teachers with a 14:1 student teacher ratio. Fairfield Elementary School has two National Blue Ribbon Awards with them from 2019 and 2025 although the program was discontinued.

== Middle School ==
Fairfield Middle School or Junior High School is 7-8 school consisting in both the elementary and high school buildings. Statistically, it is a top 75 middle school in Montana, and performs an average of 24% in math and 54% in reading. The total enrollment is 47 with 57% female, 43% male, 97.9% white, 2.1% two or more races, and 49% are economically challenged. It also contains 5 teachers which allow for a 10:1 student teacher ratio.

== High School ==
Fairfield High School is a 9-12 school consisting in its original building. The school has been ranked number 31 in the state and 6,891 in the national rankings, winning a US News Best High School award. Grade wise, the school receives a 13 rank in Montana and a 2,313 national rank for its state assessment proficiency scores. Similiary, its state assessment performance rank is 2,122 nationally and number 12 in the state. Its graduation rate rank is 15 in the state and 4,005 nationally. Additionally, it has 52% math, 67% reading, 45% science, and 97% graduation scores. The high school has a total enrollment of 107 students and 11 teachers resulting in a 9:1 student ratio. 89.7% of that population is white, 6.5% hispanic. 2.8% two or more races, .9% asian, 37% economically challenged, 25% enrolled in the free lunch program, and 12% enrolled in the reduced-price lunch program. The school has several scholarships and school wide awards including the Blue Ribbon awards mentioned earlier. Most recenently, Superintendent Dustin Gordon was named 2026 Montana Superintendent of the Year.

== Sports ==
Fairfield has basketball, volleyball, track, and football teams. They have a rivalry against the Choteau Bulldogs although it is currently only played in basketball and volleyball due to Choteau's transition to a Class C 8 man football school.

From 2010 to 2015, the high school girls' basketball team, coached by Dustin Gordon, collected 120 consecutive wins solidifying one of the longest winning streaks for a high school girls' basketball team in the United States. Fairfield High School's team name is the Eagles.

The Fairfield FBC youth program has gained statewide attention for its first of its kind JR Ref Officiating Camp. At the camp, young athletes can learn to officiate basketball, and six of the camp's attendees were so successful that they became certified Montana Officiating Association officials. The FBC program has also started two mainstream basketball challenges: a dribbling and shooting challenge. Both have been very successful, drawing athletes from as far as Washington. Fairfield participates in Class B's Northern 1b sports district.

Fairfield has produced several notable athletes including women's professional basketball player Jill Barta and NFL Charger/MSU Bobcat football player Gene Schilling.

== Footnotes ==
1. The very first elementary school partially still exists at the Baldwin residence.
2. The Grasdock nickname for the East school was due to the Grasdock place near the school
3. Before the early well for the school was dug, water from residential houses was carried to the school.

== See Also ==
- Choteau School District 1
- Power School District 30
- Choteau, Montana
- Power, Montana
- Greenfield School District 75
