= Montana Secondary Highway 435 =

Secondary highway in Montana, US

Secondary Highway 435

Route information
- Maintained by MDT
- Length: 28 mi (45 km)

Location
- Country: United States
- State: Montana
- County: Lewis and Clark

Highway system
- Montana Highway System; Interstate; US; State; Secondary

Secondary Highway 435 (S-435), also known as the Southern Rocky Mountain Front Scenic Drive, is a state secondary highway. The highway passes by scenic points such as Haystack Butte, Bean Lake, Dearborn River, and the Dearborn River High Bridge. The route is paved for a small portion.

== Route description ==
The route begins in Augusta at an intersection with US 287 and Sun Canyon Road/Manix Street. The route continues south with views of Sawtooth Ridge and Haystack Butte. The route then passes by Bean Lake. Afterwards, the road loses its paving and turns to gravel. It then crosses over the Dearborn River on the Dearborn River High Bridge. It continues south passing over Cuniff Creek, Wrangle Creek, and the confluence of Hardgrove Creek, Big Skunk Creek, and Middle Fork Dearborn River. It then joins Montana Highway 200.

During past floodings of Elk Creek, damage had been done to the highway, causing damage and some of the road to be redone. However, the route also helped the flooding, providing a blockade for the flood water.
