= Cataract Falls =

Cataract Falls can refer to

In Australia

- Cataract Falls (Blue Mountains), in the Blue Mountains, New South Wales

In the United States

- Cataract Falls in Marin County, California
- Cataract Falls (Indiana) in Owen County, Indiana
- Cataract Falls in Lewis and Clark County, Montana
