= Gilman, Montana =

- Census-designated place
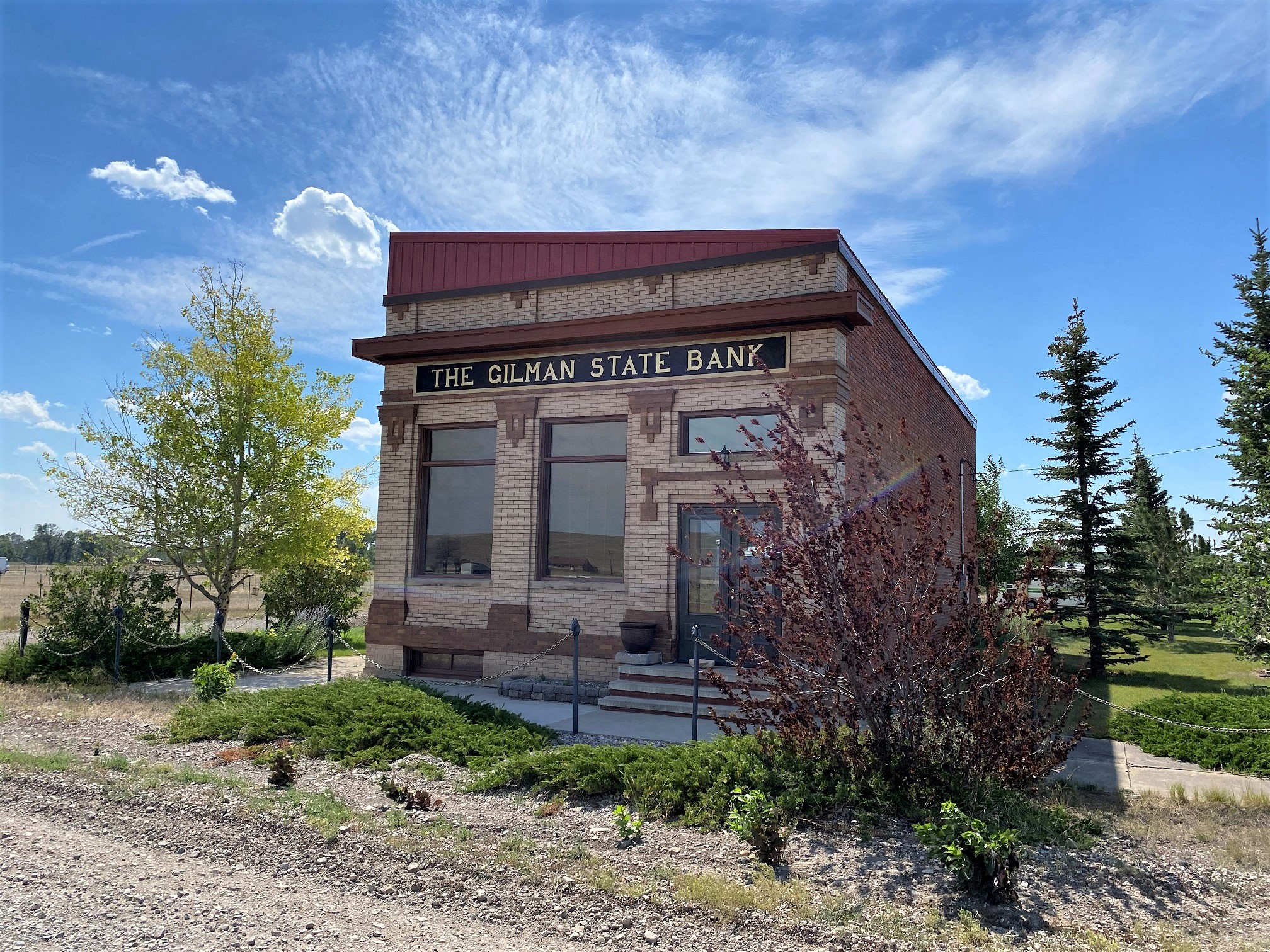
- The former Gilman State Bank building

- Location within Montana Location within the United States
- Coordinates: 47°30′33″N 112°21′28″W
- Country: United States
- State: Montana
- County: Lewis and Clark

Area
  - Total: 0.65 sq mi (1.69 km^{2})
  - Land: 0.65 sq mi (1.69 km^{2})
  - Water: 0 sq mi (0.00 km^{2})
- Elevation: 4,000 ft (1,200 m)

Population (2020)
  - Total: 48
  - Density: 73.4/sq mi (28.35/km^{2})
- Time zone: UTC-7 (Mountain (MST))
  - Summer (DST): UTC-6 (MDT)
- ZIP Code: 59410 (Augusta)
- Area code: 406
- FIPS code: 30-30750
- GNIS feature ID: 2804301

Gilman is an unincorporated community and census-designated place (CDP) in Lewis and Clark County, Montana, United States. It is near the northern border of the county, on the east side of U.S. Route 287. Augusta is less than 2 miles (3 km) to the southwest. US-287 leads northeast from Gilman 24 miles (39 km) to Choteau and south through Augusta 40 miles (64 km) to Interstate 15 near Wolf Creek. Montana Highway 21 forms the southern edge of Gilman and leads east 21 miles (34 km) to Simms.

Elk Creek, a tributary of the Sun River, flows eastward through the southern part of the CDP.

Gilman was first listed as a CDP prior to the 2020 census. As of the 2020 census, Gilman had a population of 48.

== History ==
Gilman was founded in the early 1910s as a railroad town after the Great Northern Railway completed a branch line that bypassed the nearby community of Augusta. Following a rivalry between the two communities, Gilman was selected as the western terminus of the line, and several businesses, including a bank, relocated from Augusta to Gilman. The town declined following the failure of the Gilman State Bank in 1923, and Augusta reclaimed its prominence when the rail line was extended there in the late 1920s. The former Gilman State Bank building remains one of the few surviving structures of the community.

== Demographics ==
Historical population
Census	Pop.	Note	%±
2020	48		—
U.S. Decennial Census

== Education ==
The CDP is covered by two school districts: Augusta Elementary School District and Augusta High School District. Both districts are a part of Augusta Public Schools.
