= Muddy Creek (Montana) =

Creek in Montana, United States

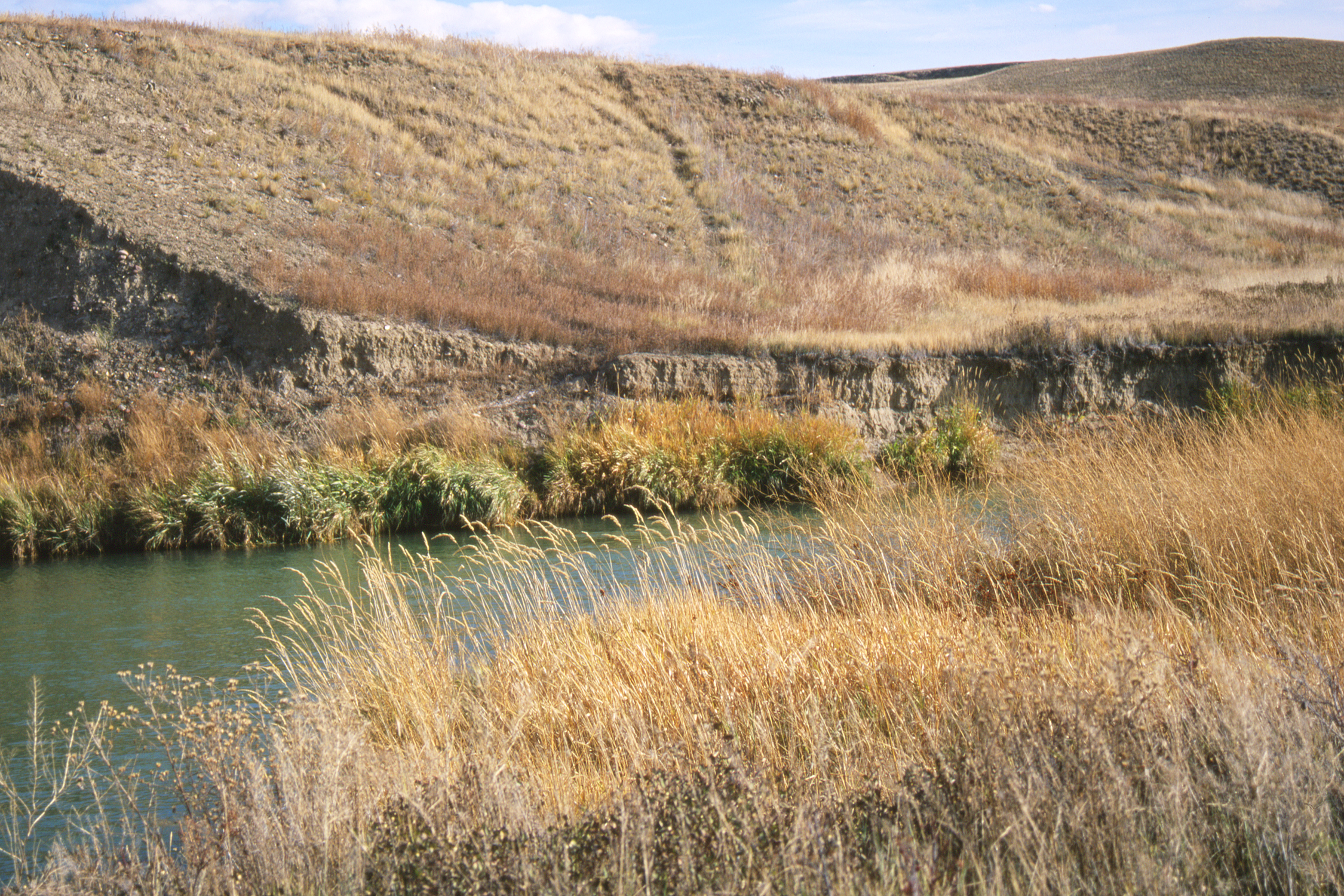
- Etymology: Large amounts of sediment

Location
- Country: United States
- State: Montana
- County: Teton County, Cascade County

Physical characteristics
- Source: Unnamed
  - coordinates: 47.774612°N 111.718769°W
- 2nd source: Unnamed Source to Muddy Creek
  - coordinates: 47.716369°N 111.733721°W
- 3rd source: Tributary to Muddy Creek RM 26
  - coordinates: 47.716270°N 111.733972°W
- 4th source: Muddy Creek Tributary RM 21
  - coordinates: 47.688490°N 111.703161°W
- 5th source: Drain E
  - coordinates: 47.671327°N 111.686540°W
- Source confluence
  - location: Power Montana
  - coordinates: 47.716309,-111.733901
- Mouth: Sun River
  - coordinates: 47.716270°N 111.733972°W

Basin features
- River system: Sun River Watershed
- Cities: Vaughn and Power

Muddy Creek is a creek in the U.S state of Montana in Teton and Cascade Counties. The creek flows from its source, then exits into the Sun River in Vaughn, Montana. The creek is a key data site for monitoring water availability for irrigation in the area, and has been known for its erosion and sediment problems.

== History ==
The general start of Muddy Creek happened when glacial Lake Great Falls was draining. The lake left behind sediment deep in the soil, causing the future erosion and large sediment flow of the creek. Later, when setttlers first came to the area, Muddy Creek suffered little to no erosion, and the creek generally only flowed during precipitation events. However, once the Greenfield Irrigation District was formed, run off water worsened the erosion, causing even more sediment to flow in the creek and outwards into the Sun River. Additionally, during times of large sediment amounts, the creek's bank would move slightly, causing several acres of farmland to be lost each year. In hope to fix the creek's problems, the Muddy Creek Task Force was formed in the 1979, in addition to studies that evaluated the creeks erosion and what could be done to improve it. After formation of the group, many projects were completed by G.I.D., but they had little impact on the creek. Then, in 1992, the State of Montana received concerns from landowners, and consequently formed a new MCTF. The newly formed group implemented their first project in 1993, and kept doing more as time went on. As a result of their contributions, the annual sediment from the creek went from to 200,000 tons to 27,000 tons. Additionally in the 1990's, the Sun River Watershed Group was formed in 1994 to address problems on both the creek and Sun River. After many projects in the 1990's by the MCTF, the group unfortunately found it hard to acquire funds for projects on the creek, so they focused on smaller water flow management projects. Currently, the Sun River Watershed Group is pursuing funds for additional erosion improvement projects.

== Creek course ==
From its source, the creek flows 42 miles eastward towards Power, Montana. Then, it turns south until it joins the Sun River near Vaughn, Montana.

== Extremities ==
Muddy Creek suffered a large flood in 1964 and large ice flows in 1947, 1979, and 2018.

== Species ==
The Montana Department of Fish, Wildlife and Parks has identified eleven species of fish in the creek. They include: brook trout, brown trout, fathead minnow, flathead chub, longnose dace, longnose sucker, mottled sculpin, mountain sucker, mountain whitefish, rainbow trout and white sucker.

== See also ==
- Sun River
- Power Montana
- Vaughn Montana
