= Deep Creek (Teton County, Montana) =

Stream in Montana, United States

- Etymology: depth of the creek

Location
- Country: United States
- State: Montana
- District: Teton County, Montana

Physical characteristics
- Source: Unnamed spring/other water source
  - coordinates: 47.76260255833306°N 112.56986394610806°W
- Mouth: Teton River (Montana)
  - coordinates: 47.93122°N 111.76927°W

Basin features
- River system: Teton
- Cities: Choteau

Deep Creek is a creek in Teton County, Montana. The creek offers some recreational opportunities such as fishing and has also been known for having little to no flow as a result of drought.

== Watercourse ==
Deep Creek begins near Saypo, Montana and upper portion of Kings Creek. The creek continues east, flowing under Deep Creek and Pearson Roads. The creek then slightly drops south and flows under Pishkuhn Road. The creek then sharply drops south near an additionally segment of Pishkuhn Road. The creek then enters Hay Coulee, where it then stops going south and starts going east. The creek continues east until it joins Willow Creek. At the joint, it continues northeast, joining two unnamed streams and Dog Creek. The creek continues northeast, flowing under US-89 and into its mouth, the Teton River.

== Species ==
Deep Creek contains a total of 14 fish species, with 11 being native to the state of Montana. They are the Brook Stickleback, Brook Trout, Brown Trout, Fathead Minnow, Goldeye, Lake Chub, Longnose Dace, Longnose Sucker, Mottled Sculpin, Mountain Sucker, Mountain Whitefish, Rainbow Trout, Westslope Cutthroat Trout, and the White Sucker.

== Land use ==
In 2015, a civil lawsuit was conducted in District Court in Teton County involving the Montana DNRC and others resulting in an access point to Deep Creek on Salmond Ranch. Additionally, a road was made, with a 3 miles (4.8 km) portion being located in the ranch, and the continuing on Bureau of Land Management and National Forest land. The portion of the road on federal land is only accessible by foot or horse. The road provides access to the creek and other areas on the Rocky Mountain Front.
