= Willow Creek Reservoir (Montana) =

Reservoir in Montana, US

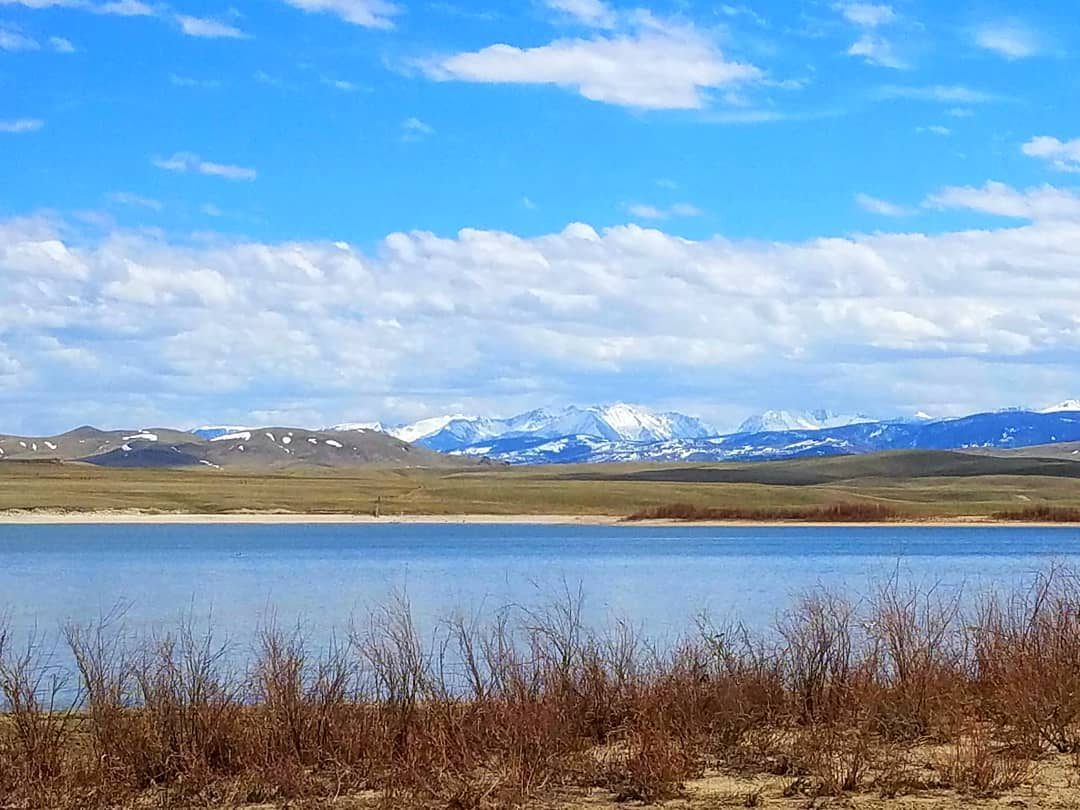
- An image of Willow Creek Reservoir
- Interactive map of Willow Creek Reservoir
- Location: Lewis and Clark County, Montana
- Coordinates: 47.557774°N 112.440830°W
- Etymology: Willow Creek- A creek next to the reservoir
- Part of: Sun River
- Primary inflows: Canal
- Primary outflows: Canals/ditches
- Surface area: 1,313.6 acres (531.6 ha)
- References: https://myfwp.mt.gov/fishMT/waterbody/43064

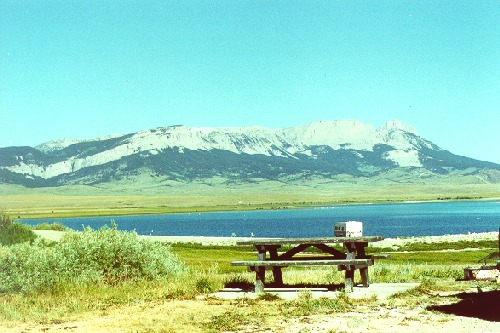

Willow Creek Reservoir is a reservoir in Lewis and Clark County, Montana. The reservoir offers recreational opportunities and irrigational water.

== History ==
Willow Creek Reservoir and the Willow Creek Dam were created as a result of the Sun River Project, and are currntly managed by the project as well as the Greenfield Irrigation District, Montana Department of Fish, Wildlife and Parks and Bureau of Reclamation.

== Species ==
The reservoir contains five species of fish. They include the rainbow trout, brook trout, tiger muskie, brook stickleback and white sucker.

== Location ==
The reservoir is located roughly 6.5 miles outiside of Augusta, Montana. To get there, travel on Sun Canyon Road and continue on it for 4.8 miles. Then, turn right on Willow Creek Road and continue for 1.7 miles.

== Geography ==
The lake contains Cretaceuos age bedrock from the Two Medicine Formation. The lake also contains deposits of Pleistocene glacial moraine deposits, soft shale, siltstone, alluvium, and sandstone.

== Events ==
The lake and various nearby organizations and companies host a kids and all age ice fishing derby during the winter, although it has been canceled numerous times due to inclement weather and lack of ice on the reservoir.

== See Also ==
- Gibson Reservoir
- Gibson Dam
- Sun River
- Piskuhn Reservoir
