= Vaughn, Montana =

- CDP
- Location of Vaughn, Montana
- Coordinates: 47°33′08″N 111°33′39″W
- Country: United States
- State: Montana
- County: Cascade

Area
  - Total: 3.58 sq mi (9.26 km^{2})
  - Land: 3.58 sq mi (9.26 km^{2})
  - Water: 0 sq mi (0.00 km^{2})
- Elevation: 3,347 ft (1,020 m)

Population (2020)
  - Total: 737
  - Density: 206/sq mi (79.6/km^{2})
- Time zone: UTC-7 (Mountain (MST))
  - Summer (DST): UTC-6 (MDT)
- ZIP code: 59487
- Area code: 406
- FIPS code: 30-76675
- GNIS feature ID: 2409506

Vaughn is a census-designated place (CDP) in Cascade County, Montana, United States. The population was 737 at the 2020 census, compared to 658 at the 2010 census. It is part of the Great Falls, Montana Metropolitan Statistical Area. It is named for Montana pioneer Robert Vaughn, whose homestead on the Vaughn Ranch encompassed part of the town.

== History ==
While trying to make his fortune gold mining in Nelson Gulch near what is now Helena, Montana, Welsh American immigrant Robert Vaughn became convinced that Montana was excellent ranching and farming country. In the fall of 1869, he traveled into Chouteau County, Montana, which at the time covered nearly a sixth of the state. About 9 miles (14 km) upstream from where the Sun River joined the Missouri River, he decided to homestead. He returned to Helena and filed paperwork to claim the land, and learned he was the first individual to formally file for a homestead in Chouteau County. Although Vaughn started out farming, he quickly turned to ranching. He imported a large number of pure-bred cattle and horses, and his horses were some of the best in the state.

Vaughn's young wife, Elizabeth, died of complications from childbirth on January 13, 1888. Devastated by her death, Vaughn determined to sell his ranch and move into nearby Great Falls. Vaughn sold his ranch in 1890 to "Captain" Thomas Couch, a Cornish immigrant and expert miner who managed the Boston and Montana Consolidated Copper and Silver Mining Company in Great Falls.

In 1890, the North Western Coal and Navigation Company constructed the Great Falls & Canada Railway, a narrow-gauge railway (3-foot (0.91 m)) which ran from Sweet Grass, Montana (at the Canada–US border) to a terminus adjacent to the Robert Vaughn Ranch. Designed to carry coal to Lethbridge, Alberta, the railroad was dubbed the "Turkey Trail". The railroad led to settlement around the terminus, and in 1910 Couch platted a town there. This town he named Vaughn, after Robert Vaughn.

== Geography ==
According to the United States Census Bureau, the CDP has a total area of 3.5 square miles (9.1 km^{2}), all land.

The Sun River flows south of town.

== Demographics ==
Historical population
Census	Pop.	Note	%±
2020	737		—
U.S. Decennial Census

As of the census of 2000, there were 701 people, 264 households, and 195 families residing in the CDP. The population density was 198.4 inhabitants per square mile (76.6/km^{2}). There were 287 housing units at an average density of 81.2 per square mile (31.4/km^{2}). The racial makeup of the CDP was 92.72% White, 1.00% African American, 2.14% Native American, 0.71% Asian, 0.14% Pacific Islander, 0.14% from other races, and 3.14% from two or more races. Hispanic or Latino of any race were 1.43% of the population.

There were 264 households, out of which 40.9% had children under the age of 18 living with them, 57.6% were married couples living together, 11.0% had a female householder with no husband present, and 25.8% were non-families. 22.3% of all households were made up of individuals, and 7.2% had someone living alone who was 65 years of age or older. The average household size was 2.66 and the average family size was 3.11.

In the CDP, the population was spread out, with 32.0% under the age of 18, 5.4% from 18 to 24, 31.0% from 25 to 44, 22.8% from 45 to 64, and 8.8% who were 65 years of age or older. The median age was 33 years. For every 100 females, there were 113.1 males. For every 100 females age 18 and over, there were 104.7 males.

The median income for a household in the CDP was $31,250, and the median income for a family was $36,111. Males had a median income of $26,375 versus $18,984 for females. The per capita income for the CDP was $13,600. About 8.0% of families and 9.8% of the population were below the poverty line, including 8.7% of those under age 18 and 4.6% of those age 65 or over.

== Media ==
The Fairfield Sun Times is the local newspaper. The FM radio station KWGF is licensed there.

== Infrastructure ==
U.S. Route 89 cuts through town from east to west. It can be reached by exit 290 on Interstate 15.

== Notable people ==
- Johnny Couch, former MLB pitcher, was born here

== Bibliography ==
- Aarstad, Rich; Arguimbau, Ellen; Baumler, Ellen; Porsild, Charlene L.; and Shovers, Brian. Montana Place Names From Alzada to Zortman. Helena, Mont.: Montana Historical Society Press 2009.
- Poor, Henry Varnum. Manual of the Railroads of the United States. New York : H.V. & H.W. Poor, 1894.
- Vaughn, Robert. Then and Now, or, Thirty-Six Years in the Rockies: Personal Reminiscences of Some of the First Pioneers of the State of Montana: Indians and Indian Wars: The Past and Present of the Rocky Mountain Country: 1864-1900. Minneapolis: Tribune Printing Co., 1900.
- Walters, Dale. "Introduction." In Then and Now, or, Thirty-Six Years in the Rockies: Personal Reminiscences of Some of the First Pioneers of the State of Montana. By Robert Vaughn. Reprint ed. Helena, Mont.: Farcountry Press, 2001.
