= KWGF =

Coordinates: 47°36′24″N 111°21′31″W

- Vaughn, Montana; United States
- Broadcast area: Great Falls, Montana
- Frequency: 101.7 MHz
- Branding: Star 101.7

Programming
- Format: Hot AC

Ownership
- Owner: Staradio Corp.

Technical information
- Licensing authority: FCC
- Facility ID: 164134
- Class: C1
- ERP: 93,400 watts
- HAAT: 273 meters (896 ft)

Links
- Public license information: Public file; LMS
- Website: 1017thestar.com

KWGF (101.7 FM) is a radio station licensed to Vaughn, Montana. The station broadcasts a Hot AC format and is owned by Staradio Corp.
