= Fairfield, Montana =

- Town
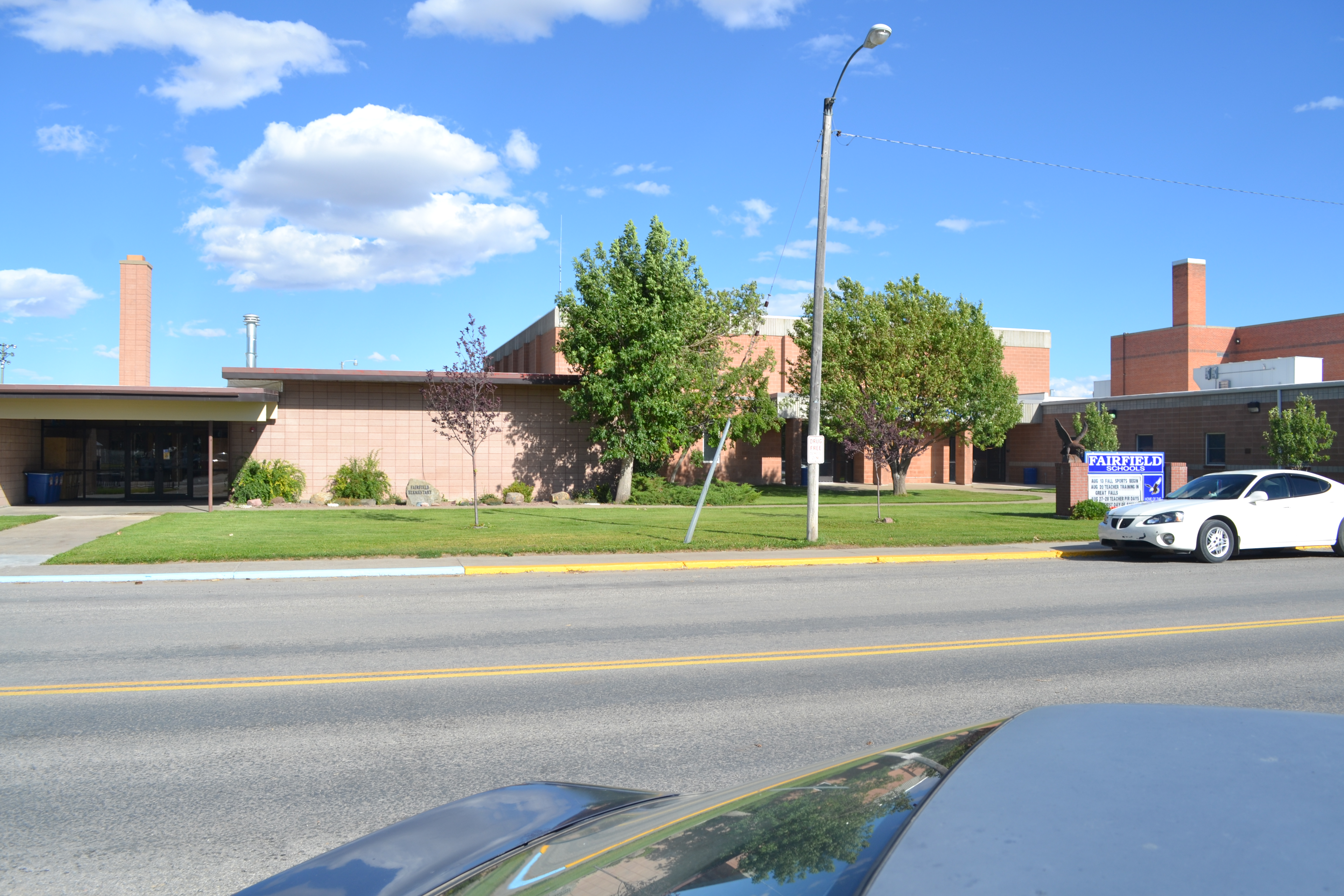
- Fairfield High School
- Nickname: Malting Barley Capital of the World
- Location of Fairfield, Montana
- Coordinates: 47°36′55″N 111°58′53″W
- Country: United States
- State: Montana
- County: Teton

Area
  - Total: 0.31 sq mi (0.81 km^{2})
  - Land: 0.31 sq mi (0.81 km^{2})
  - Water: 0 sq mi (0.00 km^{2})
- Elevation: 3,983 ft (1,214 m)

Population (2020)
  - Total: 759
  - Density: 2,420.3/sq mi (934.47/km^{2})
- Time zone: UTC-7 (Mountain (MST))
  - Summer (DST): UTC-6 (MDT)
- ZIP code: 59436
- Area code: 406
- FIPS code: 30-25225
- GNIS feature ID: 2412613
- Website: www.townoffairfield.com

Fairfield is a town in Teton County, Montana, United States. The population was 759 at the 2020 census. Fairfield is the self-proclaimed "Malting Barley Capital of the World" due to their large crops each year of malt barley.

== History ==
Fairfield began as a station on the Milwaukee Railroad.

Even though the federal government opened Montana to homesteading in 1862, this area was not initially settled. Given Montana's vast and dry landscape, irrigation was necessary. In 1902 irrigation projects began, which did lead to increased grain production. Then in 1903 the Bureau of Reclamation conducted a survey of the area. The potential of the Sun River Valley was deemed so great it was promoted as “the greatest farming country under the dome of Heaven.” In 1909 homestead size was increased from 160 acres to 320 acres. This change began drawing many more settlers to Montana.

By 1920, three dams and an extensive system of canals were created. The Gibson Dam and reservoir were completed in 1929. Today, Greenfield Irrigation District delivers water from Gibson Dam to approximately 83,000 acres surrounding this community.

Initially the name "Freeze-out Bench" was applied to the area. With irrigation the area produces abundant crops. "Greenfield Bench" and Fairfield now describe the hay and grain fields in the Sun River Valley.

== Geography ==
Fairfield is located between Great Falls and Choteau on Highway 89. Freezeout Lake, an important bird migration site, is 5 miles to the west.

According to the United States Census Bureau, the town has a total area of 0.31 square miles (0.80 km^{2}), all land.

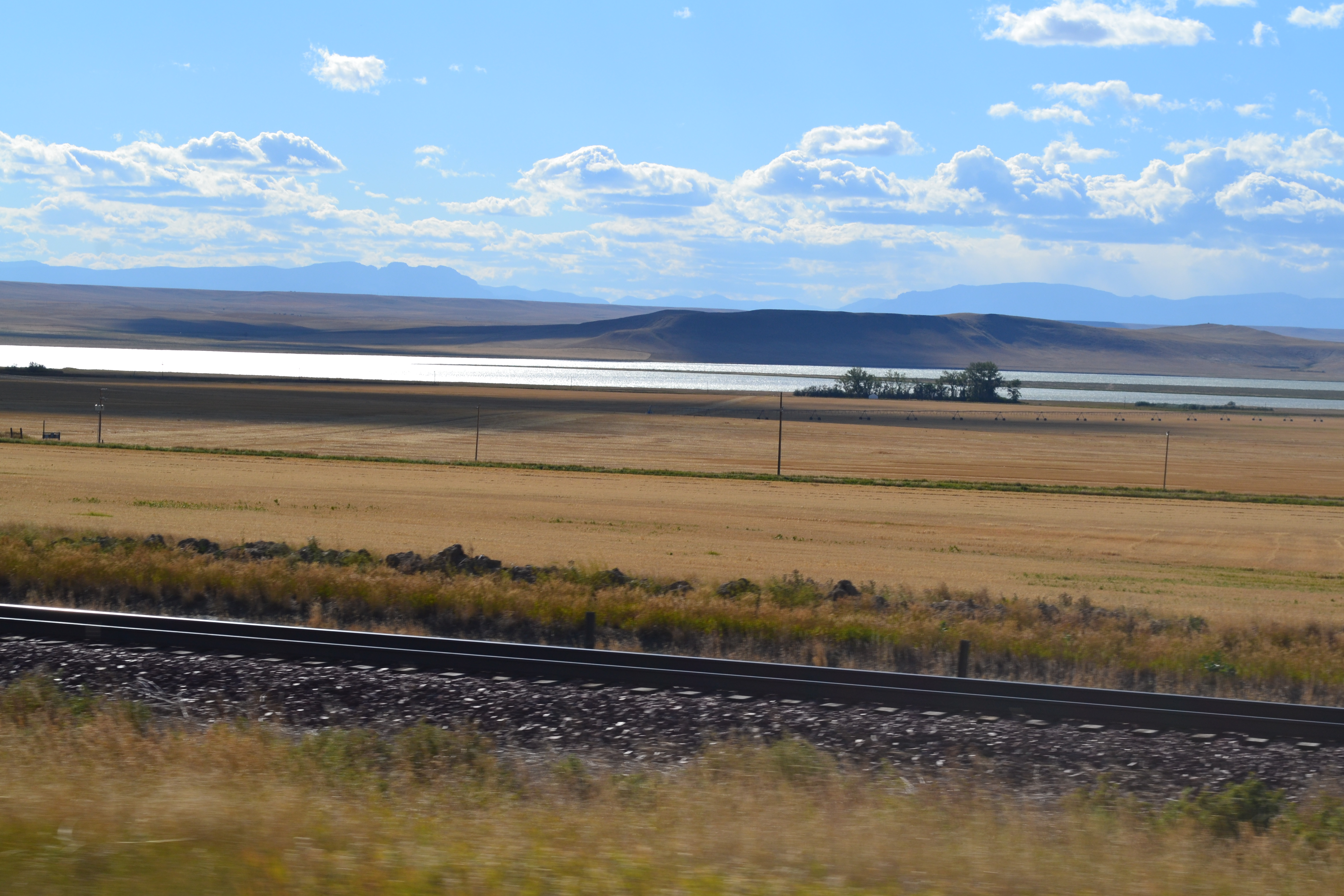
Freezeout Lake

=== Climate ===
According to the Köppen Climate Classification system, Fairfield has a semi-arid climate, abbreviated "BSk" on climate maps.

On December 14, 1924, Fairfield set the record for the largest 12-hour temperature drop in the United States when it went from 63 degrees at noon to minus 21 degrees at midnight.

=== Climate concerns ===
The recent (2024–present) dry climate has concerned the Fairfield Bench. The G.I.D, which provide water for irrigation in the area, has had to shut off the water from Gibson Dam earlier than usual. Due to this, the whole area has gone dry, impacting many people and animals. Freezout Lake has had record low water levels, affecting important migration. The dry conditions have also caused many homeowners' wells to go dry, as well as the cities. Due to low water levels, the Town of Fairfield has placed water limits. They also attempted to dig a new well in the park, but their attempt was not successful.

Climate data for Fairfield, Montana (1991–2020 normals, extremes 1927–present)
Month	Jan	Feb	Mar	Apr	May	Jun	Jul	Aug	Sep	Oct	Nov	Dec	Year
Record high °F (°C)	65 (18)	74 (23)	76 (24)	85 (29)	91 (33)	97 (36)	101 (38)	103 (39)	97 (36)	89 (32)	73 (23)	68 (20)	103 (39)
Mean maximum °F (°C)	56.1 (13.4)	56.6 (13.7)	64.9 (18.3)	73.8 (23.2)	80.9 (27.2)	86.0 (30.0)	92.9 (33.8)	92.6 (33.7)	87.5 (30.8)	77.6 (25.3)	63.3 (17.4)	54.7 (12.6)	94.6 (34.8)
Mean daily maximum °F (°C)	35.7 (2.1)	36.4 (2.4)	44.8 (7.1)	52.8 (11.6)	62.3 (16.8)	69.5 (20.8)	79.7 (26.5)	79.0 (26.1)	68.5 (20.3)	55.3 (12.9)	42.7 (5.9)	35.3 (1.8)	55.2 (12.9)
Daily mean °F (°C)	26.1 (−3.3)	26.8 (−2.9)	34.3 (1.3)	42.2 (5.7)	51.5 (10.8)	58.5 (14.7)	66.5 (19.2)	65.5 (18.6)	56.3 (13.5)	44.6 (7.0)	33.8 (1.0)	26.6 (−3.0)	44.4 (6.9)
Mean daily minimum °F (°C)	16.5 (−8.6)	17.1 (−8.3)	23.9 (−4.5)	31.5 (−0.3)	40.7 (4.8)	47.6 (8.7)	53.3 (11.8)	51.9 (11.1)	44.0 (6.7)	33.9 (1.1)	24.9 (−3.9)	17.9 (−7.8)	33.6 (0.9)
Mean minimum °F (°C)	−9.7 (−23.2)	−5.3 (−20.7)	0.0 (−17.8)	15.5 (−9.2)	28.6 (−1.9)	36.5 (2.5)	43.3 (6.3)	41.7 (5.4)	29.9 (−1.2)	14.2 (−9.9)	0.7 (−17.4)	−6.0 (−21.1)	−20.0 (−28.9)
Record low °F (°C)	−38 (−39)	−44 (−42)	−32 (−36)	−12 (−24)	11 (−12)	28 (−2)	35 (2)	31 (−1)	13 (−11)	−9 (−23)	−28 (−33)	−44 (−42)	−44 (−42)
Average precipitation inches (mm)	0.34 (8.6)	0.43 (11)	0.60 (15)	1.36 (35)	2.12 (54)	2.63 (67)	1.08 (27)	1.05 (27)	1.23 (31)	0.74 (19)	0.46 (12)	0.33 (8.4)	12.37 (314)
Average precipitation days (≥ 0.01 in)	4.4	4.9	5.6	7.1	8.0	9.4	5.8	5.7	5.5	4.3	4.2	4.1	69.0
Source: NOAA

== Demographics ==
Historical population
Census	Pop.	Note	%±
1950	693		—
1960	752		8.5%
1970	638		−15.2%
1980	650		1.9%
1990	660		1.5%
2000	659		−0.2%
2010	708		7.4%
2020	759		7.2%
U.S. Decennial Census

=== 2010 census ===
As of the census of 2010, there were 708 people, 305 households, and 204 families residing in the town. The population density was 2.8 inhabitants per square mile (1.1/km^{2}). There were 339 housing units at an average density of 1,093.5 units per square mile (422.2 units/km^{2}). The racial makeup of the town was 95.9% White, 1.3% Native American, and 2.8% from two or more races. Hispanic or Latino people of any race were 1.4% of the population.

There were 305 households, of which 30.2% had children under the age of 18 living with them, 54.4% were married couples living together, 9.8% had a female householder with no husband present, 2.6% had a male householder with no wife present, and 33.1% were non-families. 30.8% of all households were made up of individuals, and 15.8% had someone living alone who was 65 years of age or older. The average household size was 2.32 and the average family size was 2.91.

The median age in the town was 42.1 years. 27% of residents were under the age of 18; 3.7% were between the ages of 18 and 24; 22% were from 25 to 44; 26% were from 45 to 64; and 21.2% were 65 years of age or older. The gender makeup of the town was 46.9% male and 53.1% female.

=== 2000 census ===
As of the census of 2000, there were 659 people, 285 households, and 184 families residing in the town. The population density was 2,170.7 inhabitants per square mile (838.1/km^{2}). There were 311 housing units at an average density of 1,024.4 units per square mile (395.5 units/km^{2}). The racial makeup of the town was 96.97% White, 0.91% Native American, 0.15% from other races, and 1.97% from two or more races. Hispanic or Latino people of any race were 0.91% of the population.

There were 285 households, out of which 31.2% had children under the age of 18 living with them, 53.3% were married couples living together, 8.4% had a female householder with no husband present, and 35.4% were non-families. 32.3% of all households were made up of individuals, and 15.8% had someone living alone who was 65 years of age or older. The average household size was 2.31 and the average family size was 2.95.

In the town, the population was spread out, with 25.6% under the age of 18, 9.4% from 18 to 24, 28.5% from 25 to 44, 18.5% from 45 to 64, and 17.9% who were 65 years of age or older. The median age was 37 years. For every 100 females there were 95.5 males. For every 100 females age 18 and over, there were 92.2 males.

The median income for a household in the town was $29,018, and the median income for a family was $34,896. Males had a median income of $28,750 versus $18,125 for females. The per capita income for the town was $15,255. About 7.7% of families and 11.3% of the population were below the poverty line, including 17.0% of those under age 18 and 7.9% of those age 65 or over.

== Infrastructure ==
As of April 2026, Fairfield is experiencing shortage caused by drought and aging infrastructure.

== Education ==
=== Public schools ===
Fairfield School District 21 serves grades K-12.

=== Private schools ===
There is a private Mennonite school in Fairfield.

=== Libraries ===
Fairfield has a public library operated in a joint city-county arrangement.

== Media ==
The Fairfield Sun Times is a weekly newspaper that has been in operation, under various names, since the town's founding.

The radio station KINX is licensed in Fairfield.

Fairfield Bench Radio is also located in the area, and has its own mobile app.

== Notable people ==
- Gordon McOmber, Montana lieutenant governor, 1988–1989
- Jill Barta- Professional basketball player and high school basketball coach
