= Power, Montana =

- CDP
- Location of Power, Montana
- Coordinates: 47°43′14″N 111°41′40″W
- Country: United States
- State: Montana
- County: Teton

Area
  - Total: 1.51 sq mi (3.90 km^{2})
  - Land: 1.50 sq mi (3.88 km^{2})
  - Water: 0.0077 sq mi (0.02 km^{2})
- Elevation: 3,701 ft (1,128 m)

Population (2020)
  - Total: 177
  - Density: 118/sq mi (45.6/km^{2})
- Time zone: UTC-7 (Mountain (MST))
  - Summer (DST): UTC-6 (MDT)
- ZIP code: 59468
- Area code: 406
- FIPS code: 30-59500
- GNIS feature ID: 2409100

Power is a census-designated place (CDP) in Teton County, Montana, United States. As of the 2020 census, Power had a population of 177. The town is named after Montana pioneer, Thomas Charles Power, who platted the townsite in 1910.

== Geography ==
Interstate 15 passes through the community, with access from Exit 302.

According to the United States Census Bureau, the CDP has a total area of 1.5 square miles (3.9 km^{2}), of which 1.5 square miles (3.9 km^{2}) is land and 0.66% is water.

== Demographics ==
Historical population
Census	Pop.	Note	%±
2020	177		—
U.S. Decennial Census

As of the census of 2000, there were 171 people, 68 households, and 51 families residing in the CDP. The population density was 114.1 inhabitants per square mile (44.1/km^{2}). There were 71 housing units at an average density of 47.4 per square mile (18.3/km^{2}). The racial makeup of the CDP was 97.08% White, 1.17% Native American, and 1.75% from two or more races. Hispanic or Latino of any race were 0.58% of the population.

There were 68 households, out of which 33.8% had children under the age of 18 living with them, 66.2% were married couples living together, 7.4% had a female householder with no husband present, and 25.0% were non-families. 22.1% of all households were made up of individuals, and 7.4% had someone living alone who was 65 years of age or older. The average household size was 2.51 and the average family size was 2.94.

In the CDP, the population was spread out, with 30.4% under the age of 18, 4.1% from 18 to 24, 30.4% from 25 to 44, 19.9% from 45 to 64, and 15.2% who were 65 years of age or older. The median age was 37 years. For every 100 females, there were 90.0 males. For every 100 females age 18 and over, there were 91.9 males.

The median income for a household in the CDP was $38,036, and the median income for a family was $39,286. Males had a median income of $27,083 versus $13,125 for females. The per capita income for the CDP was $16,527. About 8.9% of families and 18.6% of the population were below the poverty line, including 48.6% of those under the age of eighteen and none of those 65 or over.

== Climate ==
According to the Köppen Climate Classification system, Power has a cold semi-arid climate, abbreviated "BSk" on climate maps.

== Video Game ==
During the Ludum Dare 39 Game Jam, where the theme was "Running out of Power", a participant going by the pseudonym "Pixel Prophecy" created a text-based adventure based on the town of Power, MT.

== Education ==
Power School District educates students from kindergarten through 12th grade. Power High School's team name is the Pirates.

== See also ==
- Fairfield Sun Times, local newspaper
