= Pishkun Reservoir =

Reservoir in Montana, United States

Piskuhn Reservoir
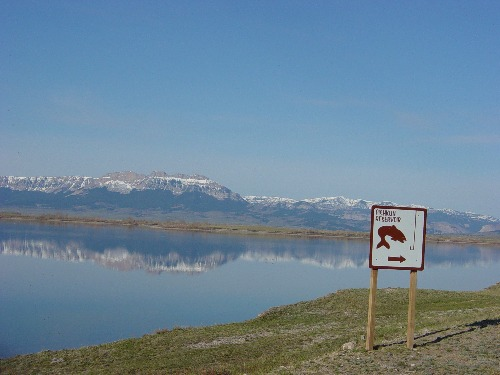
- A picture of the Reservoir
- Interactive map of Piskuhn Reservoir
- Location: Teton County, Montana
- Coordinates: 47.69066°N 112.46512°W
- Type: Reservoir
- Etymology: A "piskuhn", which is a cliff or cutbank where buffalo were driven
- Part of: Sun River Watershed/Sun River Project
- Primary inflows: Piskuhn Canal
- Primary outflows: Sun River Slope Canal
- Managing agency: Greenfield Irrigation District
- Built: 1925
- Surface area: 1,518.5 acres (614.5 ha)
- Surface elevation: 4,376 feet (1,334 m)
- Settlements: Choteau

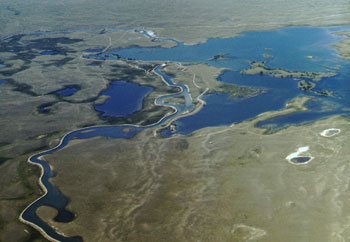

Piskuhn Reservoir is a reservoir in the U.S State of Montana in Teton County. The reservoir is managed mainly by the Greenfield Irrigation District, but also is managed by other agencies such as the Montana Department of Fish Wildlife and Parks.

== History ==
Piskhuhn Reservoir was created in 1925 as part of the Sun River Project along with Gibson Dam and Reservoir, and Willow Creek Reservoir. The reservoir was created for irrigation, and is currently owned by Greenfield Irrigation District.

== Setup ==
Piskuhn Reservoir is an offstream storage reservoir which uses water from the Sun River coming into the reservoir via canal. The reservoir is filled by 8 earthfill dikes with heights ranging from 12 to 50 feet. The overall length of the dikes is 9,050 feet. In addition to water storage, the reservoir is a wildlife management area, and is part of the Pishkuhn National Wildlife Refuge.

== Location ==
To get to Piskuhn Reservoir, take Highway 287 .5 miles south of Choteau, than 19 miles southwest on County Road.

== Species ==
Pishkuhn Reservoir is an active fishery and contains kokanee salmon, rainbow trout, northern pike, yellow perch, white sucker, spottail shiner, emerald shiner and brook stickleback.
