= Fairfield Sun Times =

- Celebrating a Century of Service to North Central Montana
- Type: Weekly newspaper
- Format: Broadsheet
- Owner: Darryl L. Flowers
- Founder: Fred Schoensigel
- Publisher: Darryl L. Flowers
- Founded: 1916; 110 years ago (as Fairfield Times)
- Headquarters: 409 Central Avenue, Fairfield, Montana
- City: Fairfield, Montana
- Circulation: 900 (as of 2016)
- Website: fairfieldsuntimes.com

The Fairfield Times & Great Falls Leader, also known as the Times-Leader, is a weekly newspaper serving Fairfield, Montana and surrounding towns Choteau, Augusta, Vaughn, Power, Simms, Ft. Shaw and Sun River. Its circulation area encompasses parts of Teton County, Cascade County and Lewis and Clark County.

== History ==
The Fairfield Times was first published by Fred Schoensigel on July 4, 1916. He sold it to W. F. Berger in 1939. The Fairfield Times merged in 1992 with the Sun Valley Sun, which was founded in 1982. In 1996, Jim Anderson sold the Fairfield Sun Times to Mike Manuel. The paper was acquired by Ron and Cindy Dauwalder in 2000.

In 2008, Darryl L. Flowers purchased the Fairfield Sun Times from the Dauwalders. A decade later he acquired the name rights for the Great Falls Leader, which published from 1888 to 1969. The title initially appeared at the top of page four of the paper, but in 2023 Flowers acquired an office space in Great Falls and a year later changed the name of the Fairfield Sun Times to the Times-Leader on July 4, 2024.
