= Simms, Montana =

- CDP
- Location of Simms, Montana
- Coordinates: 47°30′05″N 111°57′40″W
- Country: United States
- State: Montana
- County: Cascade

Area
  - Total: 7.62 sq mi (19.73 km^{2})
  - Land: 7.61 sq mi (19.71 km^{2})
  - Water: 0.0077 sq mi (0.02 km^{2})
- Elevation: 3,580 ft (1,090 m)

Population (2020)
  - Total: 361
  - Density: 47.4/sq mi (18.31/km^{2})
- Time zone: UTC-7 (Mountain (MST))
  - Summer (DST): UTC-6 (MDT)
- ZIP code: 59477
- Area code: 406
- FIPS code: 30-68575
- GNIS feature ID: 2408742

Simms is a census-designated place (CDP) in Cascade County, Montana, United States. As of the 2020 census, Simms had a population of 361. It is part of the Great Falls, Montana Metropolitan Statistical Area.

== Geography ==
Simms is located in the Sun River valley, 30 miles (48 km) west of Great Falls, 35 miles (56 km) south of Choteau, 24 miles (39 km) north of Cascade and 21 miles (34 km) east of Augusta.

According to the United States Census Bureau, the CDP has a total area of 7.7 square miles (20 km^{2}), of which 0.13% is water.

=== Climate ===
According to the Köppen Climate Classification system, Simms has a semi-arid climate, abbreviated "BSk" on climate maps.

== History ==
The town of Simms, surrounded by buttes and benches, was built on a low spot in the Sun River valley. This made a perfect place to build an irrigation system. In 1902 President Theodore Roosevelt signed the Reclamation Act, and in 1906 the Sun River Irrigation Project was begun. The townsite of Simms consists of 160 acres (0.65 km^{2}). The town was named after Simms Creek, which flows into the Sun River, approximately 1-mile (1.6 km) west of the town. The creek was named after a pair of brothers who were woodcutters along the Sun River in earlier days. After the irrigation project was started, Simms became a grain and hay growing area. Simms is an unincorporated municipality of Cascade County.

== Demographics ==
Historical population
Census	Pop.	Note	%±
2020	361		—
U.S. Decennial Census

As of the census of 2000, there were 373 people, 148 households, and 103 families residing in the CDP. The population density was 48.5 inhabitants per square mile (18.7/km^{2}). There were 160 housing units at an average density of 20.8 per square mile (8.0/km^{2}). The racial makeup of the CDP was 91.96% White, 4.83% Native American, 0.80% Asian, 0.54% from other races, and 1.88% from two or more races. Hispanic or Latino of any race were 1.61% of the population.

There were 148 households, out of which 25.7% had children under the age of 18 living with them, 61.5% were married couples living together, 4.7% had a female householder with no husband present, and 30.4% were non-families. 25.7% of all households were made up of individuals, and 11.5% had someone living alone who was 65 years of age or older. The average household size was 2.52 and the average family size was 3.06.

In the CDP, the population was spread out, with 27.1% under the age of 18, 4.3% from 18 to 24, 20.4% from 25 to 44, 29.5% from 45 to 64, and 18.8% who were 65 years of age or older. The median age was 44 years. For every 100 females, there were 108.4 males. For every 100 females age 18 and over, there were 101.5 males.

The median income for a household in the CDP was $28,333, and the median income for a family was $32,500. Males had a median income of $31,875 versus $20,714 for females. The per capita income for the CDP was $11,758. About 15.9% of families and 25.4% of the population were below the poverty line, including 40.6% of those under age 18 and 11.3% of those age 65 or over.

== Education ==
=== Primary and secondary schools ===
- Sun River middle school and Simms high school
