= Willow Creek Dam (Montana) =

- Location within Montana Location within the United States
- Country: United States
- Location: Lewis and Clark County, Montana
- Coordinates: 47°32′48″N 112°25′51″W
- Purpose: irrigation & flood control
- Status: Operational
- Construction began: 1907
- Opening date: 1911
- Built by: United States Bureau of Reclamation

Dam and spillways
- Impounds: Willow Creek
- Height: 93 ft (28 m)
- Length: 650 ft (200 m)

Reservoir
- Creates: Willow Creek Reservoir
- Total capacity: 32,400 acre⋅ft (40,000,000 m^{3})
- Surface area: 1,530 acres (620 ha)
- Normal elevation: 4,150 ft (1,265 m)

Willow Creek Dam (National Inventory of Dams ID MT00577) is a dam in Lewis and Clark County, Montana.

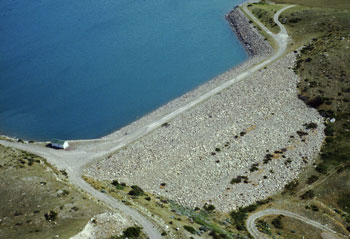

The earthen dam was originally constructed between 1907 and 1911 by the United States Bureau of Reclamation, then modified and reinforced several times since. With a height of 93 feet (28 m) and 650 feet (200 m) long at its crest, it impounds Willow Creek for irrigation storage and flood control, part of the Bureau's larger Sun River Project. The dam is owned and operated by the Bureau.

The reservoir it creates, Willow Creek Reservoir, has a water surface of 1,530 acres (620 ha), another 3,069 acres (1,242 ha) of surrounding land, about 11 miles (18 km) of shoreline, and a maximum capacity of 32,400 acre-feet (40,000,000 m^{3}). Recreation includes fishing (for rainbow trout and kokanee salmon), camping, hunting, boating, and hiking.
