= Gibson Reservoir =

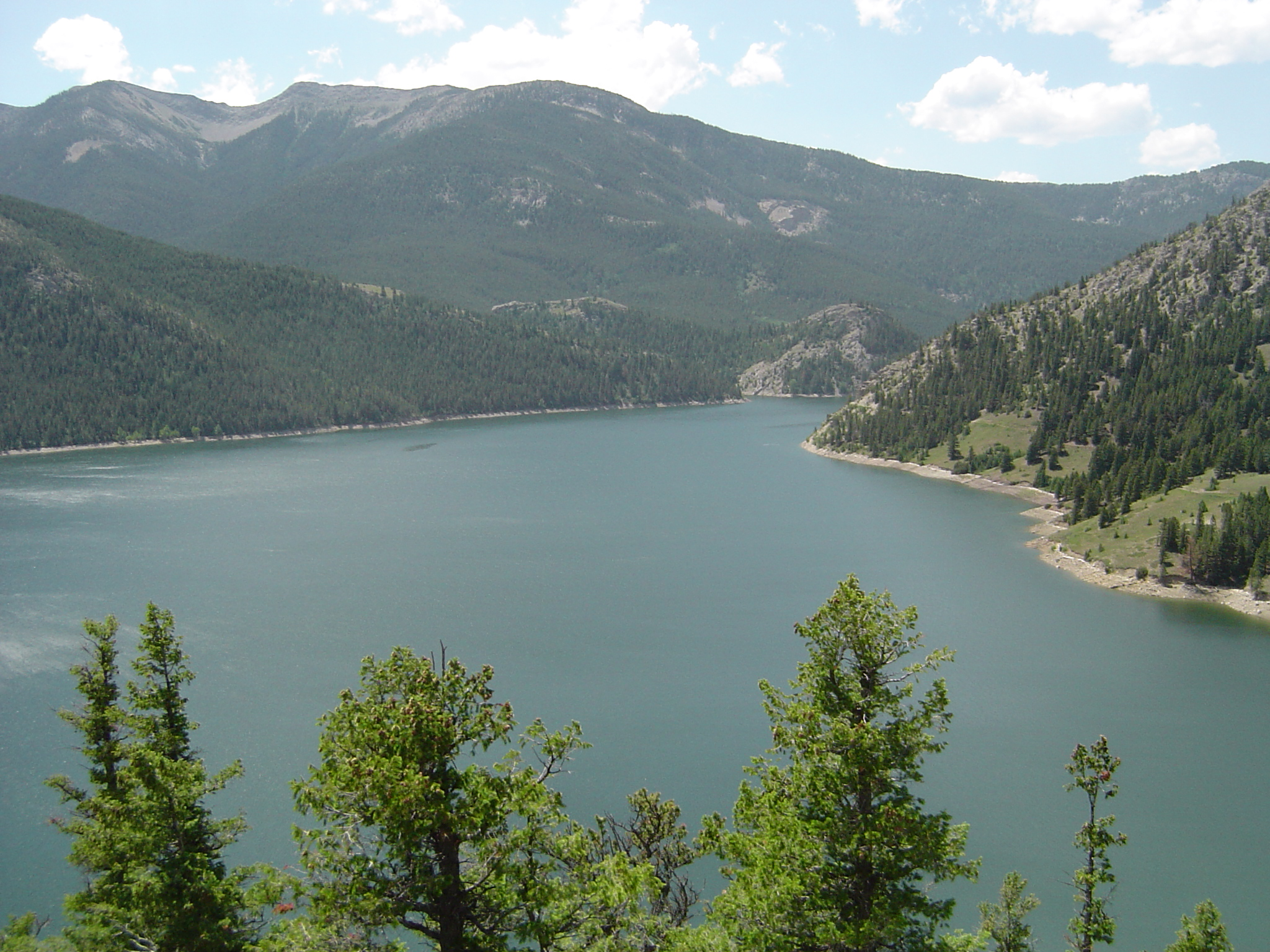

- Location within Montana
- Location: Teton County & Lewis & Clark County, Montana, United States
- Coordinates: 47°36′12″N 112°45′39″W
- Type: Reservoir
- Primary inflows: South Fork Sun River; North Fork Sun River
- Primary outflows: Sun River
- Built: 1926-1929
- Max. length: 4.5 miles (7.2 km)
- Max. width: 3,500 feet (1,100 m)
- Surface area: 1,288.8 acres (521.6 ha)
- Max. depth: 123 feet (37 m)
- Water volume: 96,477 acre-feet (119,003,000 m^{3})
- Surface elevation: 4,869 feet (1,484 m)

Gibson Reservoir is a man-made body of water located just south of the Bob Marshall Wilderness, 20 miles (32 km) northwest of Augusta, Montana. It forms part of the county line between Teton and Lewis & Clark counties. The reservoir is formed by the concrete arch Gibson Dam and backs water up between a hilly pass for about 3 miles. The water in the dam is initially provided by spring snow runoff and carried there via the North Fork Sun River and the South Fork Sun River right after the two join. The reservoir is mainly used for irrigation control.
