= Gibson Dam =

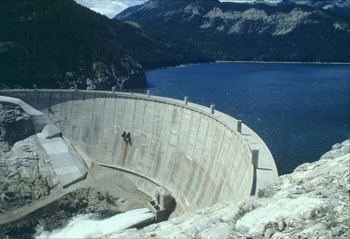
- Interactive map of Gibson Dam
- Country: United States
- Location: Lewis and Clark/Teton Counties, Montana
- Coordinates: 47°36′12″N 112°45′39″W
- Purpose: Irrigation
- Construction began: 1926
- Opening date: 1929

Dam and spillways
- Type of dam: Concrete arch
- Impounds: Sun River
- Height: 199 ft (61 m)
- Length: 960 ft (290 m)

Reservoir
- Creates: Gibson Reservoir
- Total capacity: 96,477 acre⋅ft (119,003,000 m^{3})
- Catchment area: 575 mi^{2} (1,490 km^{2})
- Surface area: 1,296 acres (524 ha)

Gibson Dam is a concrete arch dam on the Sun River, a tributary of the Missouri River, about 60 miles (97 km) west of Great Falls, Montana in the United States. Located on the eastern edge of the Rocky Mountains, the dam was built by the U.S. Bureau of Reclamation (USBR) between 1926 and 1929 as part of the Sun River Project to develop about 93,000 acres (38,000 ha) of irrigated land in the Sun River Valley.

== Specifications ==
The dam is a 199 ft (61 m) high and 960 ft (290 m) long arch gravity structure, with a base thickness of 115 ft (35 m) tapering to 15 ft (4.6 m) at the crest. As a whole the dam contains about 167,500 yd^{3} (128,100 m^{3}) of concrete. The impounded water forms Gibson Reservoir, which can store up to 96,477 acre⋅ft (119,003,000 m^{3}) at full water levels of 4,724 ft (1,440 m). When full, the reservoir covers 1,296 acres (524 ha), with a shoreline of roughly 15 mi (24 km) and a maximum depth of 195 ft (59 m). Water releases are controlled by two sets of outlets: three release valves at the base of the dam have a combined capacity of 3,050 cu ft/s (86 m^{3}/s), while a gated tunnel spillway, controlled by six 34 ft × 12 ft (10.4 m × 3.7 m) radial gates, can pass a maximum of 30,000 cu ft/s (850 m^{3}/s).

Gibson Dam's main function is to capture spring snowmelt and release it during summer for the irrigation for about 81,000 acres (33,000 ha) of land on the north side of the Sun River and 10,150 acres (4,110 ha) south of the river. Water released from Gibson travels downstream for about 3 mi (4.8 km) before it is intercepted by the Sun River Diversion Dam, which diverts water into the Pishkun Supply Canal, which sends water to the offstream Pishkun Reservoir. The Sun River Slope Canal System takes water from Pishkin Reservoir to serve the irrigated lands on the north side of the river. The headworks for the Fort Shaw Canal, which serves the lands south of the river, are located further downstream and take water directly from the river. The lands north of the river comprise the Greenfields Irrigation District, while the south side is run by the Fort Shaw Irrigation District.

== History ==
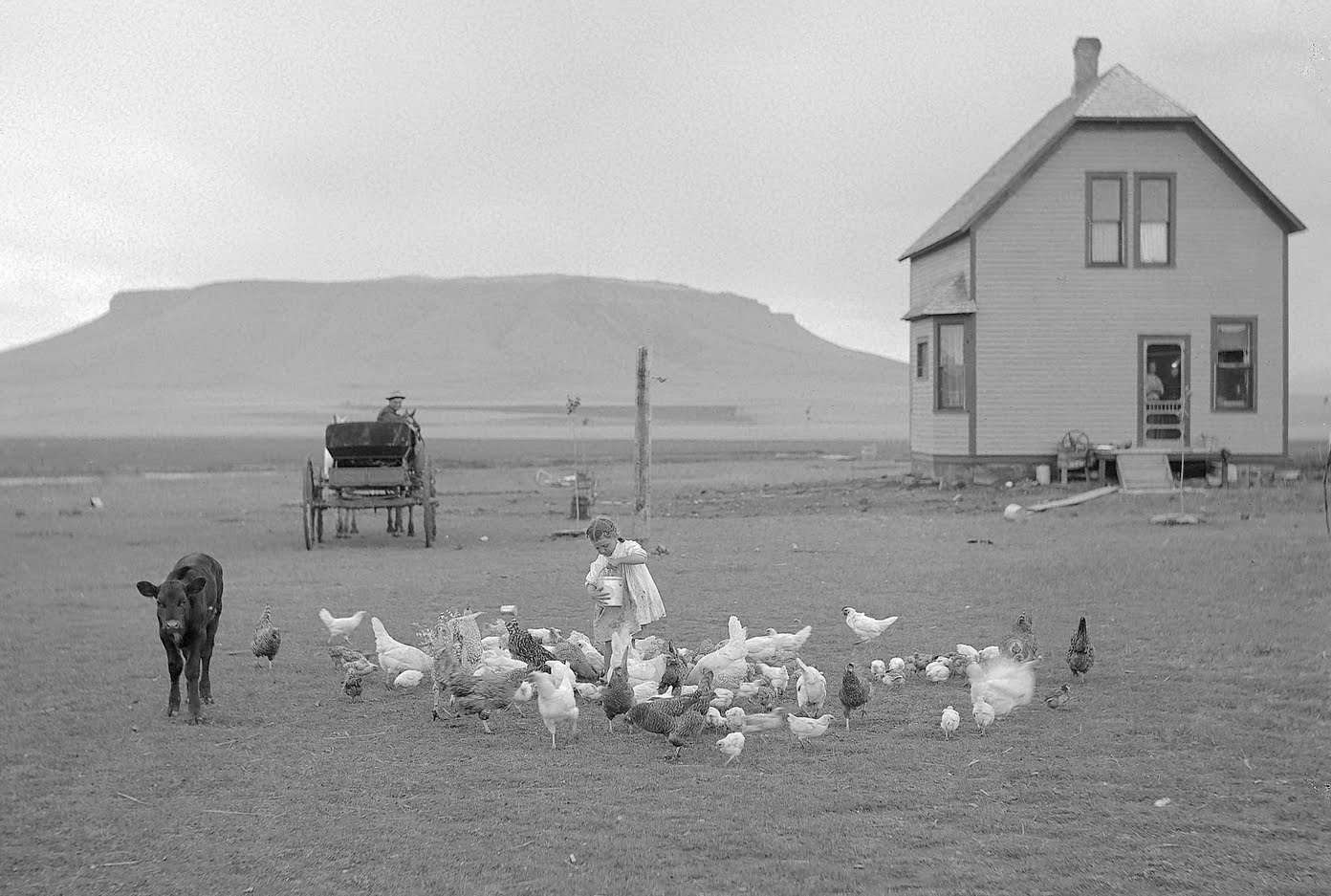
Arid conditions in the area before the dam, the Hancock homestead, July 23, 1910

On September 26, 1906, the Department of the Interior authorized the USBR's Sun River Project, under pressure from local residents, namely those of Great Falls, who wanted the irrigation of lands east of the Rocky Mountains along the Sun and Teton Rivers. Early proposals included the diversion of streams from west of the Continental Divide to augment the arid region's water supply, but eventually the project was pared down to comprise two storage dams on the Sun River and a tributary, Willow Creek; two off-stream reservoirs and a diversion dam; and seven main canals.

As early as 1889, the Gibson Dam site – located in a narrow mountain gap a few miles above the mouth of the Sun River canyon – had been identified by U.S. surveyor Herbert Wilson as an excellent location to develop water storage on the Sun River. More detailed studies in 1911 by the USBR (then the U.S. Reclamation Service) confirmed Wilson's idea, and the first plans for a dam were drafted around 1920. However, it was not until September 1926 when the $1.5 million main construction contract was given to Utah Construction Company. The dam was one of the first to be built using the trial-load method, which relies primarily on mathematical calculations to determine the pressure of water on the structure, and thus the dam's final design. This method allowed the USBR to save an estimated 41,000 yd^{3} (31,000 m^{3}) of concrete, lowering costs significantly, since otherwise a considerable safety margin would have had to be built into the dam.

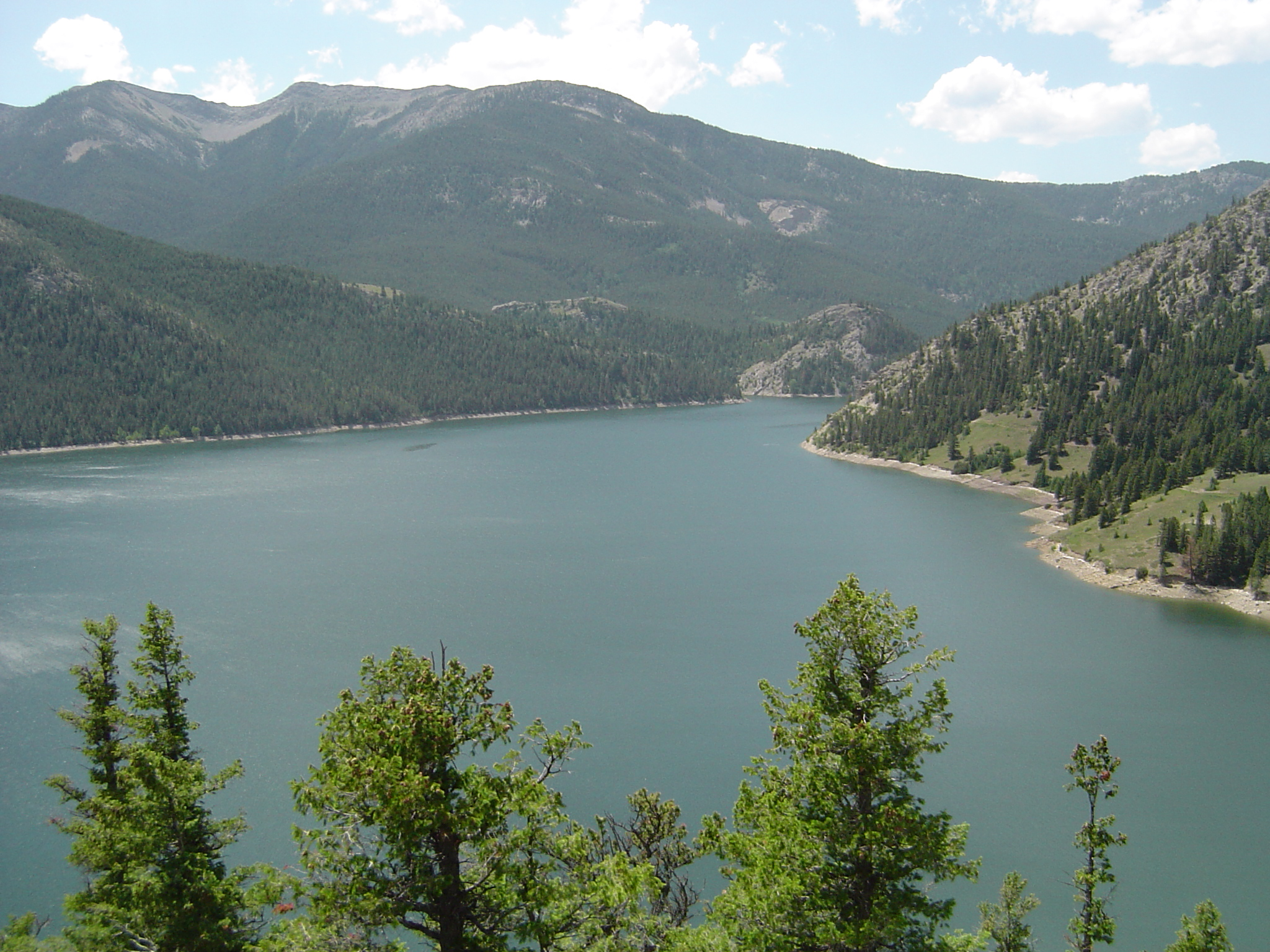
Gibson Reservoir seen from above

Actual construction started in December 1926, with Albert E. Paddock as project superintendent and Ralph Lowry as construction engineer. Preliminary excavations and site clearing were followed by the placement of a wooden flume to divert the river before concrete pouring in the foundation work could begin. When the foundations were complete, the flume was closed and water allowed to pass through outlet holes in the base of the dam. Concrete for the dam was mixed at a site roughly 1,500 ft (460 m) downstream and transported to the construction site via a light railway. The concrete was then placed via buckets transported by a cableway system, supported by two 280 ft (85 m) high towers.

Two penstocks were installed on the south side of the dam and 28 miles (45 km) of transmission lines were built connecting the dam and Augusta, Montana in preparation for future hydroelectric generation. However, after determining that the future reservoir would not have enough capacity to sustain power production, USBR sealed the penstocks and the power lines fell into disuse. The dam was completed and the first water stored in December 1929 after three years of construction.

In 1938, gates were installed in the spillway, increasing the reservoir's storage capacity by 20 percent.

At least three people were killed on the project, including Paddock and an unknown workman; the latter fell from a 60 ft (18 m) height and struck the former on April 20, 1929. In the early phases of construction in 1926, a laborer, M. G. Miller, died from injuries sustained from a dynamite explosion.

== Flood control ==
By halting the Sun River's spring freshet, Gibson Dam has prevented an estimated $3,044,000 in flooding damage between 1950 and 1999.

In 1964, western Montana experienced one of the greatest flooding events in its recorded history, when record snowpack followed by heavy early spring rains caused more than $438 million (2011 dollars) of damage in the Flathead and Missouri River basins. On June 8, after reports of at least three dam failures on tributaries of the Missouri sent local residents into a panic, there were rumors that the Gibson Dam had failed. A U.S. Forest Service pilot was sent to investigate and found that water was overtopping the dam by over 3 ft (0.91 m). The USBR later estimated the peak flow over the dam at 66,000 cubic feet per second (1,900 m^{3}/s), of which at least half was over the crest. After this event the dam was retrofitted so that it could be safely overtopped by up to 12 ft (3.7 m) of water.

== Hydroelectric power proposal ==
The Gibson Dam Hydroelectric Company "Gibson Hydro" is a two-member partnership proposing a renewable energy facility on the Gibson Dam. Tollhouse Energy of Bellingham, WA a small-business hydropower developer and Greenfields Irrigation District of Fairfield, MT a farmer-managed water utility, are proposing the addition of a 15 megawatt (MW) powerhouse at the base of the dam. The powerhouse would generate electricity from irrigation water releases with an estimated annual production of 42.9 million kilowatt hours.

== Climate ==
Climate data for Gibson Dam, Montana, 1991–2020 normals, extremes 1911–present
Month	Jan	Feb	Mar	Apr	May	Jun	Jul	Aug	Sep	Oct	Nov	Dec	Year
Record high °F (°C)	67 (19)	69 (21)	82 (28)	82 (28)	90 (32)	99 (37)	106 (41)	100 (38)	96 (36)	90 (32)	76 (24)	68 (20)	106 (41)
Mean maximum °F (°C)	54.1 (12.3)	53.4 (11.9)	61.0 (16.1)	69.1 (20.6)	76.7 (24.8)	83.1 (28.4)	90.9 (32.7)	91.6 (33.1)	85.4 (29.7)	74.5 (23.6)	60.6 (15.9)	51.6 (10.9)	93.5 (34.2)
Mean daily maximum °F (°C)	35.6 (2.0)	36.0 (2.2)	42.5 (5.8)	49.8 (9.9)	59.1 (15.1)	67.2 (19.6)	78.5 (25.8)	78.0 (25.6)	67.5 (19.7)	53.9 (12.2)	42.0 (5.6)	34.5 (1.4)	53.7 (12.1)
Daily mean °F (°C)	24.1 (−4.4)	24.1 (−4.4)	30.5 (−0.8)	37.6 (3.1)	45.9 (7.7)	53.3 (11.8)	61.6 (16.4)	60.4 (15.8)	51.9 (11.1)	41.2 (5.1)	31.2 (−0.4)	23.9 (−4.5)	40.5 (4.7)
Mean daily minimum °F (°C)	12.4 (−10.9)	12.2 (−11.0)	18.5 (−7.5)	25.4 (−3.7)	32.7 (0.4)	39.4 (4.1)	44.7 (7.1)	42.7 (5.9)	36.3 (2.4)	28.5 (−1.9)	20.3 (−6.5)	13.3 (−10.4)	27.2 (−2.7)
Mean minimum °F (°C)	−13.8 (−25.4)	−10.9 (−23.8)	−2.5 (−19.2)	12.3 (−10.9)	23.5 (−4.7)	32.4 (0.2)	37.5 (3.1)	35.6 (2.0)	26.3 (−3.2)	12.3 (−10.9)	−1.5 (−18.6)	−9.3 (−22.9)	−23.8 (−31.0)
Record low °F (°C)	−47 (−44)	−49 (−45)	−33 (−36)	−11 (−24)	−1 (−18)	22 (−6)	28 (−2)	26 (−3)	8 (−13)	−13 (−25)	−35 (−37)	−44 (−42)	−49 (−45)
Average precipitation inches (mm)	0.67 (17)	0.92 (23)	0.82 (21)	1.63 (41)	2.93 (74)	3.13 (80)	1.14 (29)	1.33 (34)	1.31 (33)	1.12 (28)	0.78 (20)	0.77 (20)	16.55 (420)
Average snowfall inches (cm)	6.8 (17)	10.8 (27)	11.6 (29)	7.5 (19)	2.0 (5.1)	0.0 (0.0)	0.0 (0.0)	0.2 (0.51)	0.3 (0.76)	3.9 (9.9)	5.7 (14)	7.6 (19)	56.4 (141.27)
Average precipitation days (≥ 0.01 in)	4.8	6.1	6.7	7.5	9.9	10.9	6.3	5.9	6.5	5.4	5.0	5.1	80.1
Average snowy days (≥ 0.1 in)	4.1	4.4	4.5	2.5	0.7	0.0	0.0	0.1	0.1	1.4	3.4	3.1	24.3
Source 1: NOAA (snow/snow days 1981–2010)
Source 2: National Weather Service

== See also ==
- List of dams and reservoirs in Montana
