= Sun River =

Sun River Medicine River, Pointed Rock River
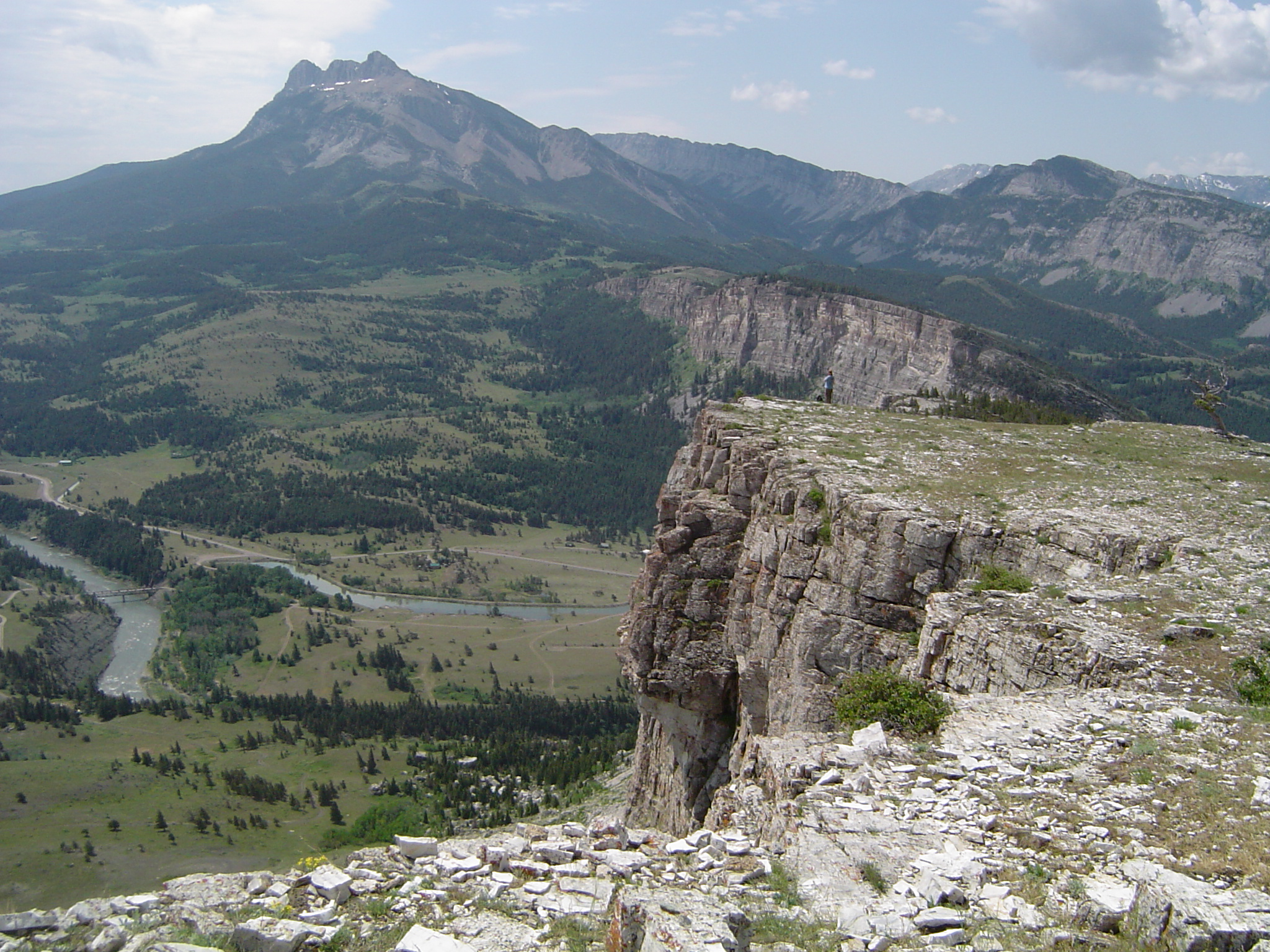
- The headwaters of the Sun River in the Rockies, near Gibson Reservoir

- Location of the mouth of the Sun River in Montana

Location
- Country: United States
- State: Montana
- Cities: Fairfield, Sun River, Vaughn, Great Falls

Physical characteristics
- Source: North Fork Sun River
  - location: Confluence of Open Creek and McDonald Creek, Lewis and Clark County
  - coordinates: 47°54′43″N 112°58′23″W
  - elevation: 5,781 ft (1,762 m)
- 2nd source: South Fork Sun River
  - location: Sun Lake, Lewis and Clark County
  - coordinates: 47°20′07″N 112°53′29″W
  - elevation: 6,988 ft (2,130 m)
- Source confluence
  - location: Near Gibson Reservoir, Lewis and Clark County
  - coordinates: 47°37′47″N 112°51′25″W
  - elevation: 4,728 ft (1,441 m)
- Mouth: Missouri River
  - location: Great Falls, Cascade County
  - coordinates: 47°29′42″N 111°18′43″W
  - elevation: 3,314 ft (1,010 m)
- Length: 130 mi (210 km)
- Basin size: 1,875 sq mi (4,860 km^{2})
- Discharge
  - location: Vaughn
  - average: 669 cu ft/s (18.9 m^{3}/s)
  - minimum: 20 cu ft/s (0.57 m^{3}/s)
  - maximum: 53,500 cu ft/s (1,510 m^{3}/s)

Basin features
- River system: Missouri River watershed
- Tributaries
  - left: North Fork Sun River, Muddy Creek
  - right: South Fork Sun River, Willow Creek

The Sun River (also called the Medicine River) is a tributary of the Missouri River in the Great Plains, approximately 130 mi (209 km) long, in Montana in the United States. It sits in the Sun River Valley, also commonly referred to as The Valley for short, a river valley in Cascade County. The valley helps support agriculture with access to irrigation.

== Geography ==
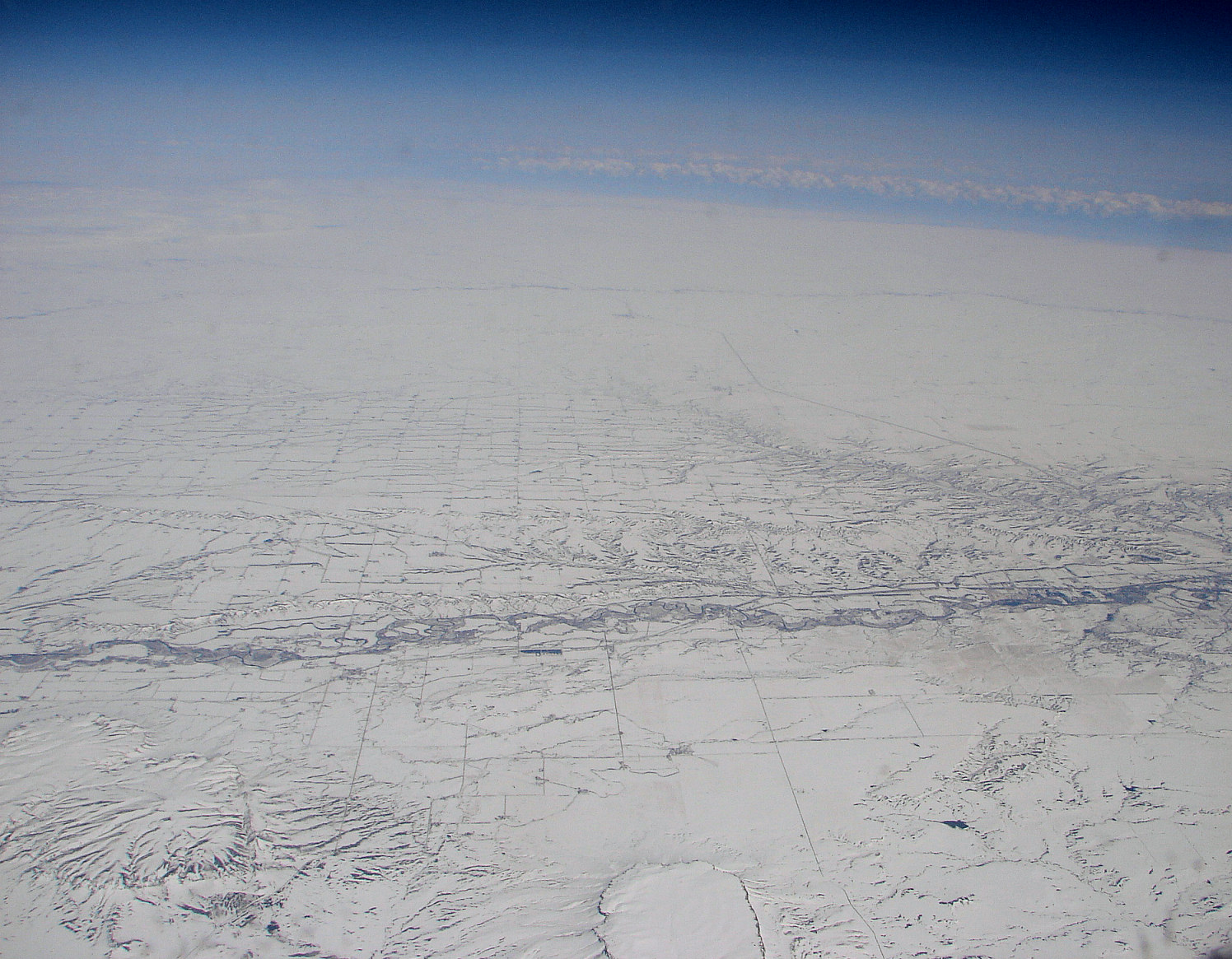
Aerial view of Sun River in Cascade County in early spring 2009

The river rises in the Rocky Mountains in two forks, the North Fork and South Fork, which join in the Helena-Lewis and Clark National Forest above Gibson Reservoir along the county line between Teton and Lewis and Clark counties. It flows E, SE, and E away from the mountains, past Simms, Sun River, and Vaughn and joins the Missouri at Great Falls.

The water of the river is used extensively for irrigation, through the Sun River Project of the United States Bureau of Reclamation. The irrigation area covers approximately 92,000 acres (372 km^{2}).

The North Fork of the Sun River begins high up in the Bob Marshall Wilderness and flows generally Southward for about 20 miles (32 km) until it meets up with the South Fork of the Sun River. Almost immediately the two forks flow into Gibson Reservoir, impounded by Gibson Dam. From when the water leaves the reservoir until it meets the Missouri River in Great Falls, the flowage is known as the Sun River.

The Sun is a Class I river from Gibson Dam to its confluence with the Missouri River for public access for recreational purposes.

River	Location	Discharge
North Fork Sun River	Augusta, MT	350 cu ft/s (9.9 m^{3}/s)
South Fork Sun River	Augusta, MT	360 cu ft/s (10 m^{3}/s)
Sun River	Fort Shaw, MT	929 cu ft/s (26.3 m^{3}/s)

Due to the proximity of the river, most of the Sun River Valley contains green vegetation mostly year round. Along with lush vegetation, the valley offers flat land formed by the river, which makes perfect conditions for agriculture, although at one point the soil left from the river was not desirable (See history).

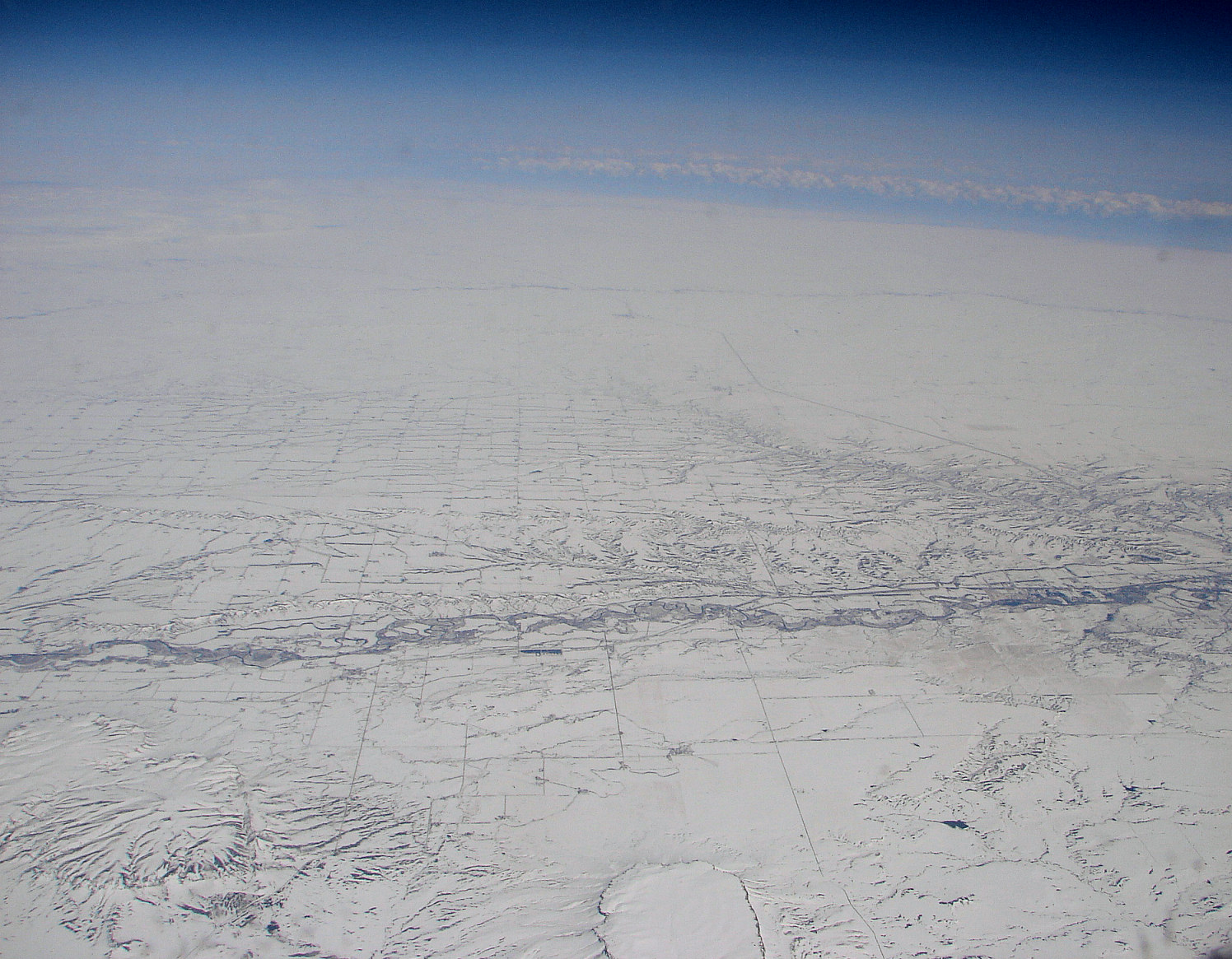
An aerial view of the Sun River in Cascade County

== History ==
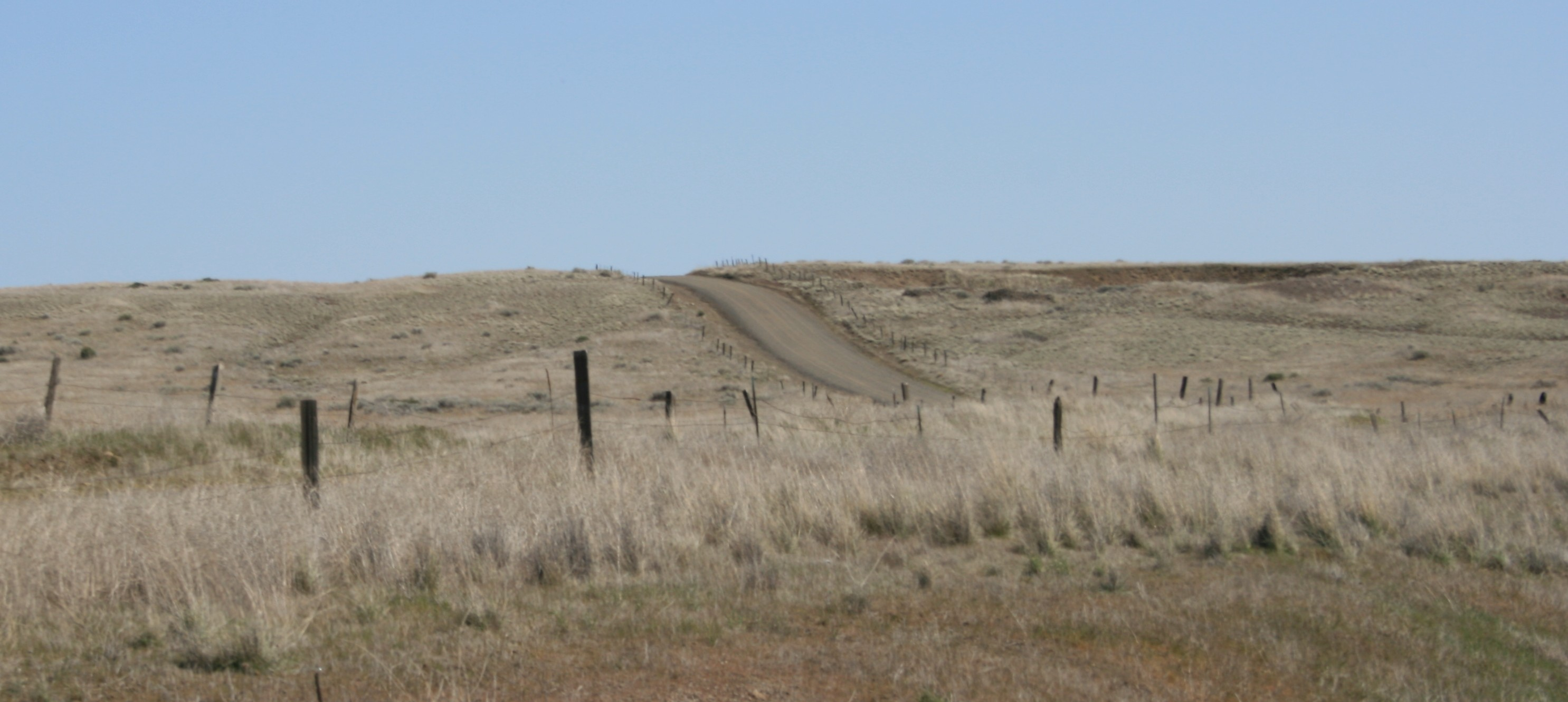
the Mullan Road

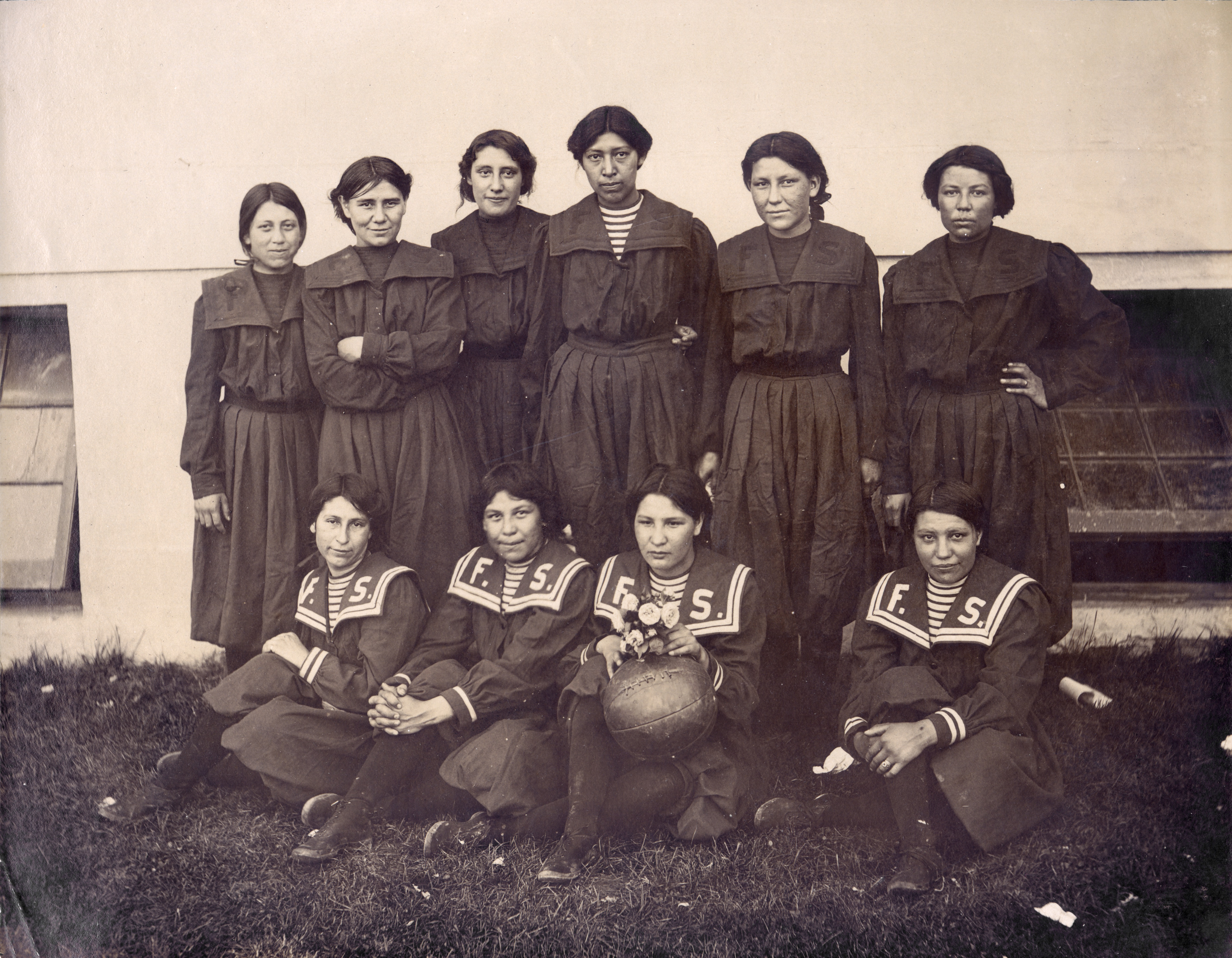
the Fort Shaw Indian School Women's basketball team

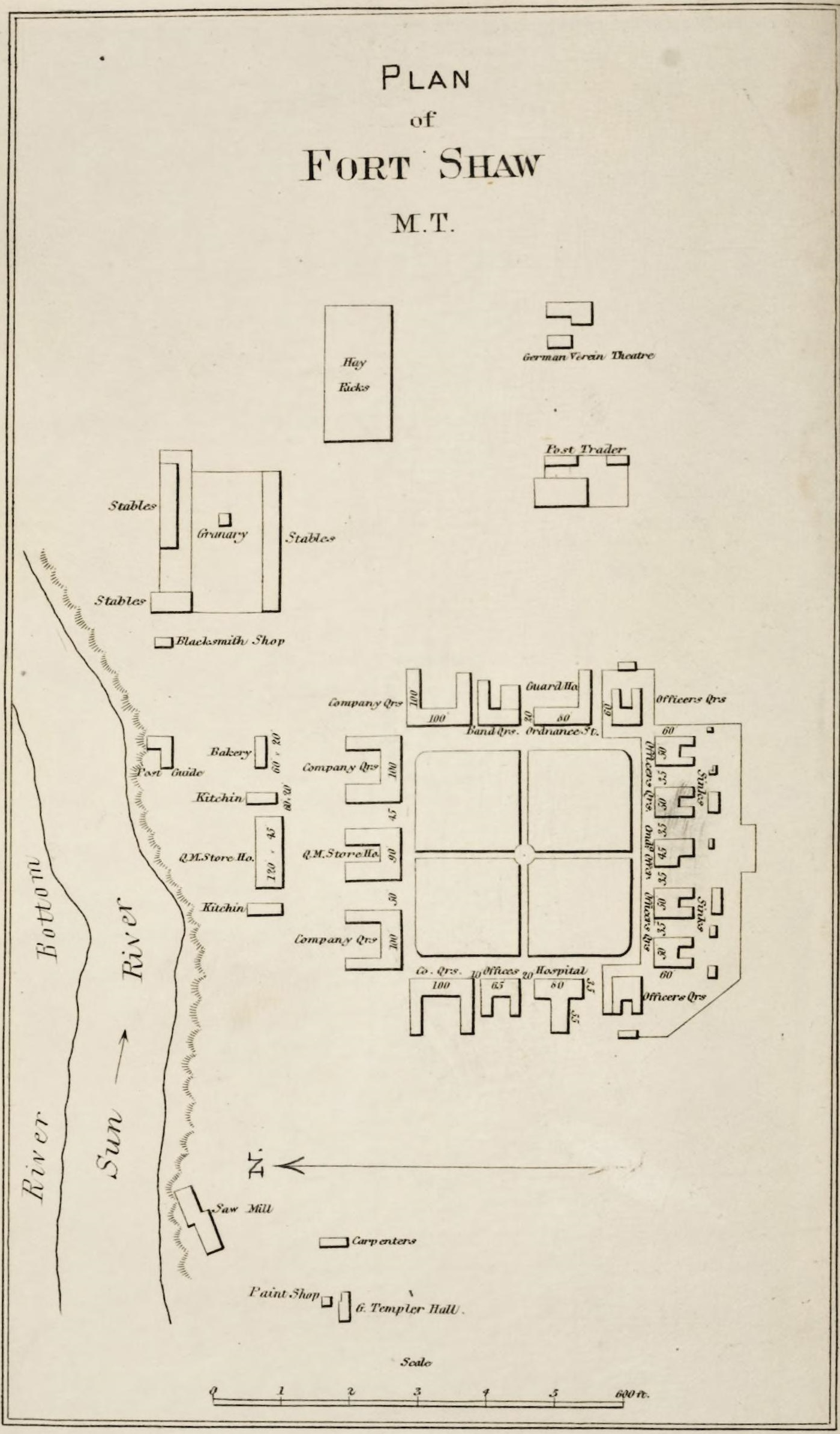
plan of use for Fort Shaw

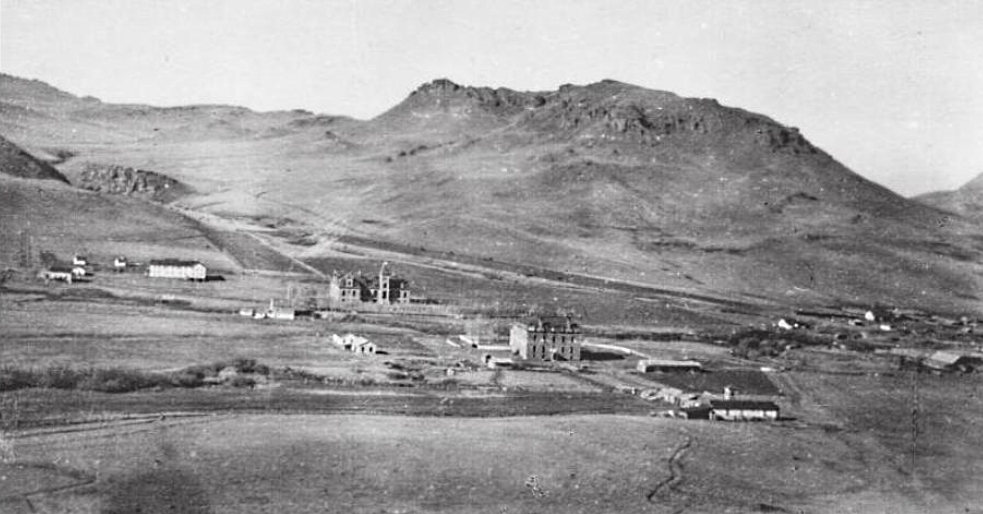
St. Peter's Mission

Montana Highway 200

Before modern humans, indigenous people, mosty Blackfeet but often included other tribes roamed where present day communities, homesteads, and other modern conveniences are located now. In addition to Native Americans, there were homesteaders- crossing the Sun River at present day Sun River, Montana using a river crossing, and using the nearby Mullan Road to navigate across the Rocky Mountains. U.S. soldiers and Jesuit priests built Fort Shaw, a major military fort and Jesuit mission built in the 1860s which to help serve during the Civil War. However, the fort was more majorly used to "civilize" the Native Americans. Although the area was busy with many projects and military operations in the making, soon, the fort closed with the Civil War operations declining. However, Fort Shaw was not removed but instead was utilized with a boarding school, church, and other amenities added on to the previous fort's structure, funded by both the previous fort's military personnel and nearby missionaries. The projects ultimately were a success, with high enrollment in the school, good education, and unique opportunities including a highly successful Indian girls basketball team. (1904 Fort Shaw Indian Girls Basketball Team) However, very like the fort, the boarding school closed in the 1910s with low demand for Indian education. Afterwards, Native Americans generally left the area, and the Jesuit priests moved their occupations to nearby St. Peter's Mission. Soon, the valley became somewhat empty, only containing original homesteaders that settled earlier as a result of poor job opportunities. However, two irrigation projects changed that. The formation of the Sun River/Fort Shaw Irrigation Projects started in the 1890s and completed in the 1910s allowed for crops to grow where they previously couldn't before. Additionally, farmers gained better technology, with special improvements to their soil and machinery. As a result of new agricultural oppurtinities, the Sun River Valley experienced a population boom. Many communities stayed with populations anywhere from 150 to 500 for a while, and progress and improvements were made. However, populations soon quickly declined with a drought, but rose once again as it went away. Soon afterwards, a highway, Montana Highway 200, although at the time dubbed a "high-speed gravel road connecting Simms to Bonner", was built in the late 1930s and greatly improved accessibility for transport. With the growing population, the highway was later improved and enlarged to connect the communities of the valley to U.S. 89 junctions by Fairfield and Sun River and to Montana Secondary Highway 21.

A sign located 3 miles south of Great Falls gives information on the history of the Sun River:

This river was called "The Medicine" by the Indians. On the return trip from the coast Capt. Lewis of the Lewis & Clark Expedition struck this river approximately 50 miles west of here. He followed it down to the Missouri passing near this point July 11, 1806. In his journal under that date he said:

"when I arrived in sight of the white-bear Islands the missouri bottoms on both sides of the river were crowded with buffaloe I sincerely believe that there were not less than 10 thousand buffaloe within a circle of 2 miles around that place"

The City of Great Falls covers a portion of the plain across which the Expedition made their difficult 18 mile portage around the falls of the Missouri in June 1805

To preserve the history of the Sun River Valley, the Sun River Valley Historical Society was formed in 1977. Today, the valley is mostly the same, but most communities have dropped in population due to urbanization.

== Lifestyle/Culture ==
The Sun River Valley offers a wide amount of jobs, opportunities and experiences. Common jobs in the area typically are involved with farming, ranching, and irrigation. The Sun River Valley offers many recreational opportunities but mostly include hiking, fishing, and hunting. The valley is served by Sun River Valley/Simms and the Vaughn school districts which offer education to those who live in or near the communities of the Sun River Valley.

== Communities ==
The Sun River Valley contains 4 census-designated places. They are:

- Simms
- Fort Shaw
- Sun River
- Vaughn

== Special Events ==
- Valley Fun Days- Early August summer celebration

== See also ==
- List of rivers of Montana
- Montana Stream Access Law
