= Augusta, Montana =

- Census-designated place
- Location of Augusta, Montana
- Coordinates: 47°29′22″N 112°23′32″W
- Country: United States
- State: Montana
- County: Lewis and Clark

Area
  - Total: 0.92 sq mi (2.39 km^{2})
  - Land: 0.92 sq mi (2.39 km^{2})
  - Water: 0 sq mi (0.00 km^{2})
- Elevation: 4,078 ft (1,243 m)

Population (2020)
  - Total: 316
  - Density: 342.6/sq mi (132.26/km^{2})
- Time zone: UTC-7 (Mountain (MST))
  - Summer (DST): UTC-6 (MDT)
- ZIP code: 59410
- Area code: 406
- FIPS code: 30-03025
- GNIS feature ID: 2407782

Augusta is an unincorporated community and census-designated place (CDP) in Lewis and Clark County, Montana, United States. The population was 309 at the 2010 census and rose to 316 in the 2020 census. The most accepted version in the naming of this town is after Augusta Hogan, thought to be the first child born in this town, the daughter of J. D. Hogan, an early rancher.

Augusta is part of the Helena Micropolitan Statistical Area.

The original townsite was dedicated on May 8, 1893. A fire on April 4, 1901, destroyed part of the town.

On October 10, 2020, a fire caused by an electrical issues engulfed the historic Bunkhouse Inn.

== Geography ==
Augusta is located in northern Lewis and Clark County on the north side of Elk Creek (or the South Fork of the Sun River), which flows out of the Lewis and Clark Range to the southwest and leads northeast to the Sun River, part of the Missouri River watershed.

According to the United States Census Bureau, the Augusta CDP has a total area of 0.93 square miles (2.4 km^{2}), all land.

Augusta is a gateway to the Bob Marshall Wilderness and Scapegoat Wilderness areas and the Lewis and Clark National Forest.

Elk Creek flows through the CDP, and has even caused Augusta streets to flood. (See climate)

=== Climate ===
According to the Köppen Climate Classification system, Augusta has a semi-arid climate, abbreviated "BSk" on climate maps.

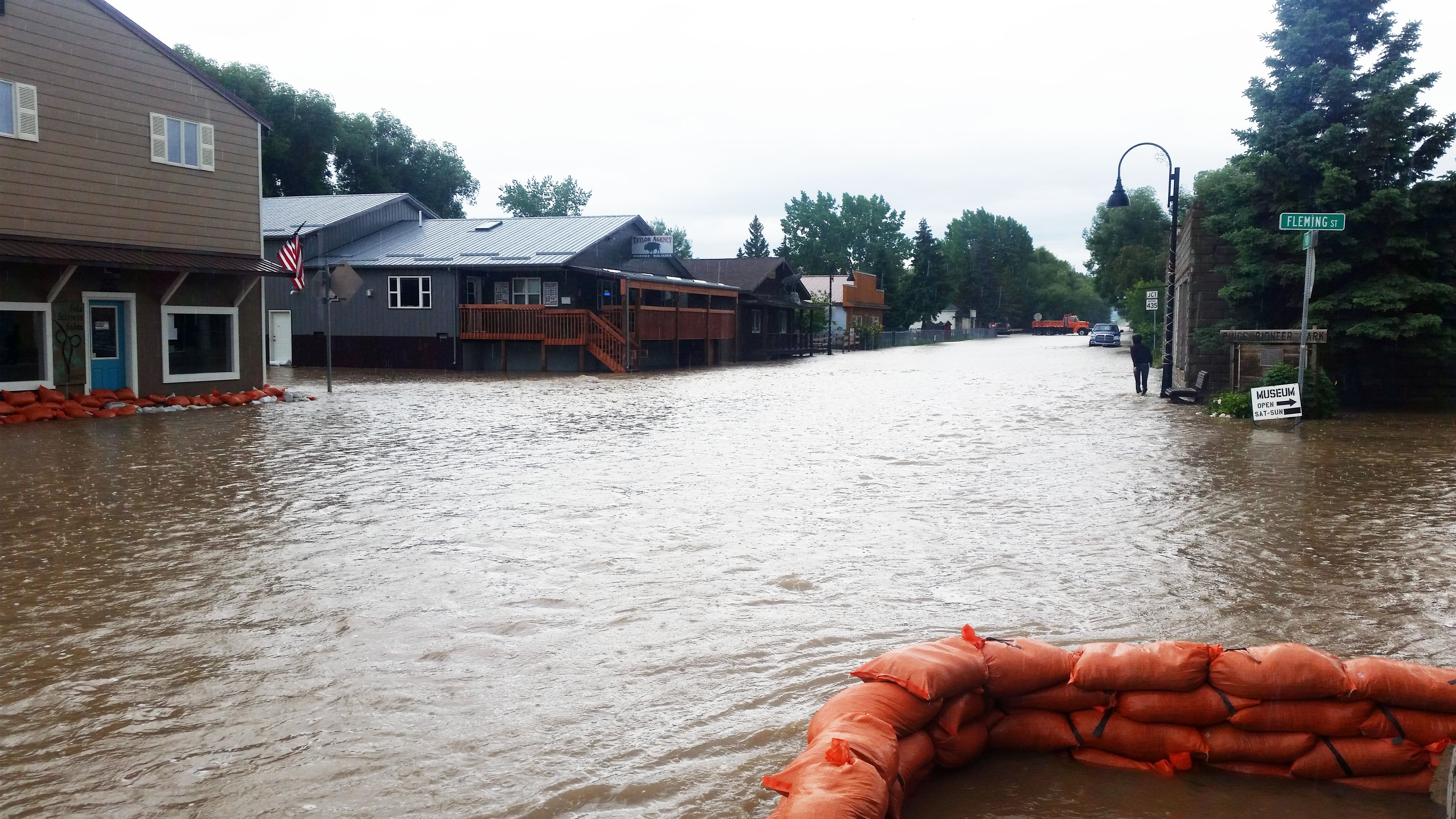
An image of Augusta flooding in 2018

Augusta has suffered some years of heavy rain, causing nearby Elk Creek to overflow into Augusta streets. Such incidents have occurred in 2011, 2018, an even in the 1900s – 1910s.

Climate data for Augusta, Montana (1991–2020 normals, extremes 1901–present)
Month	Jan	Feb	Mar	Apr	May	Jun	Jul	Aug	Sep	Oct	Nov	Dec	Year
Record high °F (°C)	71 (22)	72 (22)	76 (24)	89 (32)	94 (34)	102 (39)	102 (39)	103 (39)	97 (36)	94 (34)	79 (26)	69 (21)	103 (39)
Mean daily maximum °F (°C)	39.0 (3.9)	39.5 (4.2)	47.0 (8.3)	55.1 (12.8)	64.5 (18.1)	71.9 (22.2)	82.4 (28.0)	82.0 (27.8)	72.7 (22.6)	58.8 (14.9)	45.0 (7.2)	38.4 (3.6)	58.0 (14.4)
Daily mean °F (°C)	28.0 (−2.2)	27.7 (−2.4)	35.3 (1.8)	43.2 (6.2)	51.8 (11.0)	59.3 (15.2)	66.9 (19.4)	65.7 (18.7)	57.4 (14.1)	46.2 (7.9)	35.3 (1.8)	28.2 (−2.1)	45.4 (7.4)
Mean daily minimum °F (°C)	17.1 (−8.3)	16.0 (−8.9)	23.6 (−4.7)	31.4 (−0.3)	39.1 (3.9)	46.6 (8.1)	51.3 (10.7)	49.5 (9.7)	42.2 (5.7)	33.5 (0.8)	25.6 (−3.6)	18.0 (−7.8)	32.8 (0.4)
Record low °F (°C)	−51 (−46)	−48 (−44)	−40 (−40)	−22 (−30)	7 (−14)	23 (−5)	30 (−1)	23 (−5)	0 (−18)	−17 (−27)	−39 (−39)	−48 (−44)	−51 (−46)
Average precipitation inches (mm)	0.45 (11)	0.69 (18)	0.71 (18)	1.64 (42)	2.67 (68)	3.01 (76)	1.17 (30)	1.18 (30)	1.38 (35)	1.40 (36)	0.70 (18)	0.51 (13)	15.51 (394)
Source 1: NOAA
Source 2: National Weather Service

== Demographics ==
Historical population
Census	Pop.	Note	%±
2020	316		—
U.S. Decennial Census

As of the 2020 census, there were 316 people, and 142 households in the CDP. There were 205 housing units (161 occupied). 25.2% of people were under 18 and 23.3% were 65 and over.

As of the census of 2000, there were 284 people, 142 households, and 83 families residing in the CDP. The population density was 509.1 inhabitants per square mile (196.6/km^{2}). There were 193 housing units at an average density of 346.0 per square mile (133.6/km^{2}). The racial makeup of the CDP was 92.61% White, 2.46% Native American, 1.41% from other races, and 3.52% from two or more races. Hispanic or Latino of any race were 1.76% of the population.

There were 142 households, out of which 19.0% had children under the age of 18 living with them, 48.6% were married couples living together, 6.3% had a female householder with no husband present, and 41.5% were non-families. 38.7% of all households were made up of individuals, and 19.0% had someone living alone who was 65 years of age or older. The average household size was 2.00 and the average family size was 2.63.

In the CDP, the population was spread out, with 19.4% under the age of 18, 4.2% from 18 to 24, 16.9% from 25 to 44, 33.5% from 45 to 64, and 26.1% who were 65 years of age or older. The median age was 50 years. For every 100 females, there were 104.3 males. For every 100 females age 18 and over, there were 112.0 males.

The median income for a household in the CDP was $24,688, and the median income for a family was $30,956. Males had a median income of $23,125 versus $15,536 for females. The per capita income for the CDP was $14,608. About 9.6% of families and 14.7% of the population were below the poverty line, including 27.5% of those under the age of eighteen and 6.1% of those 65 or over.

== Education ==
Augusta has a public school system serving grades K-12. The CDP is covered by two school districts: Augusta Elementary School District and Augusta High School District. Both districts are a part of Augusta Public Schools. Augusta High School is a Class C school. The mascot is the Elks.

Augusta has a public library, a branch of the Lewis & Clark Library.

== Media ==
The Augusta Breeze is an online newspaper, published through the Great Falls Gazette.

== Infrastructure ==
U.S. Route 287 passes through Augusta as the northern part of its Main Street, and leads north 26 miles (42 km) to its northern terminus at Choteau and south 38 miles (61 km) to Interstate 15 near Wolf Creek. Helena, the state capital, is 76 miles (122 km) south of Augusta via US 287 and I-15. Montana Highway 21 leads east from Augusta 22 miles (35 km) to Simms and is the first in a series of highways that lead east 54 miles (87 km) to Great Falls.
