= National Register of Historic Places listings in Jefferson County, Montana =

Location of Jefferson County in Montana

This is a list of the National Register of Historic Places listings in Jefferson County, Montana. It is intended to be a complete list of the properties and districts on the National Register of Historic Places in Jefferson County, Montana, United States. The locations of National Register properties and districts for which the latitude and longitude coordinates are included below, may be seen in a map.

There are 15 properties and districts listed on the National Register in the county, including 1 National Historic Landmark.

This National Park Service list is complete through NPS recent listings posted October 16, 2026.

== Listings county-wide ==
	Name on the Register	Image	Date listed	Location	City or town	Description
1	Beavertown Historic District	Beavertown Historic District	June 30, 2022 (#100007897)	Address restricted	Jefferson City vicinity	
2	Boulder Hot Springs Hotel	Boulder Hot Springs Hotel	January 12, 1979 (#79001403)	Southeast of Boulder on Montana Highway 69; 46°12′02″N 112°05′33″W	Boulder	
3	W.C. Child Ranch	W.C. Child Ranch	November 23, 1977 (#77000819)	South of East Helena on Montana Highway 518; 46°34′05″N 111°54′42″W	East Helena	
4	Fraternity Hall	Fraternity Hall	April 3, 1975 (#75001084)	Main St. 46°16′30″N 111°56′44″W	Elkhorn	
5	The Grant-Marshall Lime Kiln Historic District	The Grant-Marshall Lime Kiln Historic District	December 14, 2017 (#100001898)	1000 ft. S of S end of Crystal Dr. 46°34′06″N 111°59′47″W	Helena	
6	Hall Bungalow		November 19, 2021 (#100007197)	500 Lower Valley Rd. 46°08′46″N 111°58′07″W	Boulder vicinity	
7	Homestake Airway Beacon		May 31, 2019 (#100004037)	Along Continental Divide at Homestake Pass in Beaverhead-Deerlodge National Forest; 45°55′11″N 112°25′00″W	Butte vicinity	Extends into Silver Bow County.
8	Jefferson Canyon Highway Historic District	Jefferson Canyon Highway Historic District	July 23, 2018 (#100002692)	Milepost .5 to 12.3 of MT 2; 45°50′24″N 111°54′34″W	Cardwell vicinity	
9	Jefferson County Courthouse	Jefferson County Courthouse	August 6, 1980 (#80002422)	200 Centennial Ave. 46°14′09″N 112°07′16″W	Boulder	
10	Lewis and Clark Caverns Historic District	Lewis and Clark Caverns Historic District	May 29, 2018 (#100002505)	Lewis & Clark Caverns Rd; 45°49′30″N 111°51′05″W	LaHood vicinity	
11	MacHaffie Site (24JF4)	MacHaffie Site (24JF4)	April 3, 1986 (#86000619)	Address restricted	Montana City	
12	Modern Hotel	Modern Hotel	December 22, 2011 (#11000951)	Legion Ave. & Main St. 45°52′11″N 112°05′58″W	Whitehall	
13	Montana Deaf and Dumb Asylum	Montana Deaf and Dumb Asylum	May 10, 1985 (#85000994)	Off Montana Highway 69; 46°13′52″N 112°08′24″W	Boulder	
14	Montana State Training School Historic District	Montana State Training School Historic District	November 24, 2014 (#14000957)	Roughly bounded by Montana Highway 69, Riverside Road, and the Boulder River; 46°13′40″N 112°07′09″W	Boulder	
15	Whitetail Airway Beacon	Whitetail Airway Beacon	March 13, 2020 (#100005094)	16 miles north of Whitehall; 46°04′48″N 112°08′25″W	Whitehall vicinity	

== See also ==
- List of National Historic Landmarks in Montana
- National Register of Historic Places listings in Montana
