= Montana Highway 67 =

Highway in Montana

Montana Highway 67
- Oilfield Road
- MT 67 highlighted in red

Route information
- Maintained by MDT
- Length: 1.755 mi (2.824 km)

Major junctions
- South end: US 2 in Shelby
- North end: I-15 in Shelby

Location
- Country: United States
- State: Montana
- Counties: Toole

Highway system
- Montana Highway System; Interstate; US; State; Secondary
← MT 66	→ MT 68

Montana Highway 67 (MT 67) is a 1.8-mile-long (2.9 km) state highway in the US state of Montana. The southern terminus is at an intersection with I-15 Business Loop (I-15 BL) and U.S. Route 2 (US 2) in Shelby, and the northern terminus is at Interstate 15 (I-15) on the north side of town.

== Route description ==
MT 67 starts at an intersection with I-15 Bus./US 2 in Shelby and proceeds in a generally northerly direction along Oilfield Avenue, running concurrently with I-15 BL. The highway ends at a diamond interchange with I-15 which also marks the northern end of I-15 BL.

== Major intersections ==
The entire highway is in Shelby, Toole County.

mi	km	Destinations	Notes
0.000	0.000	I-15 BL south / US 2	Southern terminus; southern end of I-15 BL concurrency
1.755	2.824	I-15 – Lethbridge, Great Falls I-15 BL south	Northern terminus; northern end of I-15 BL concurrency; I-15 exit 364
1.000 mi = 1.609 km; 1.000 km = 0.621 mi
