= Elkhorn Mountains =

Mountain range in Montana, United States

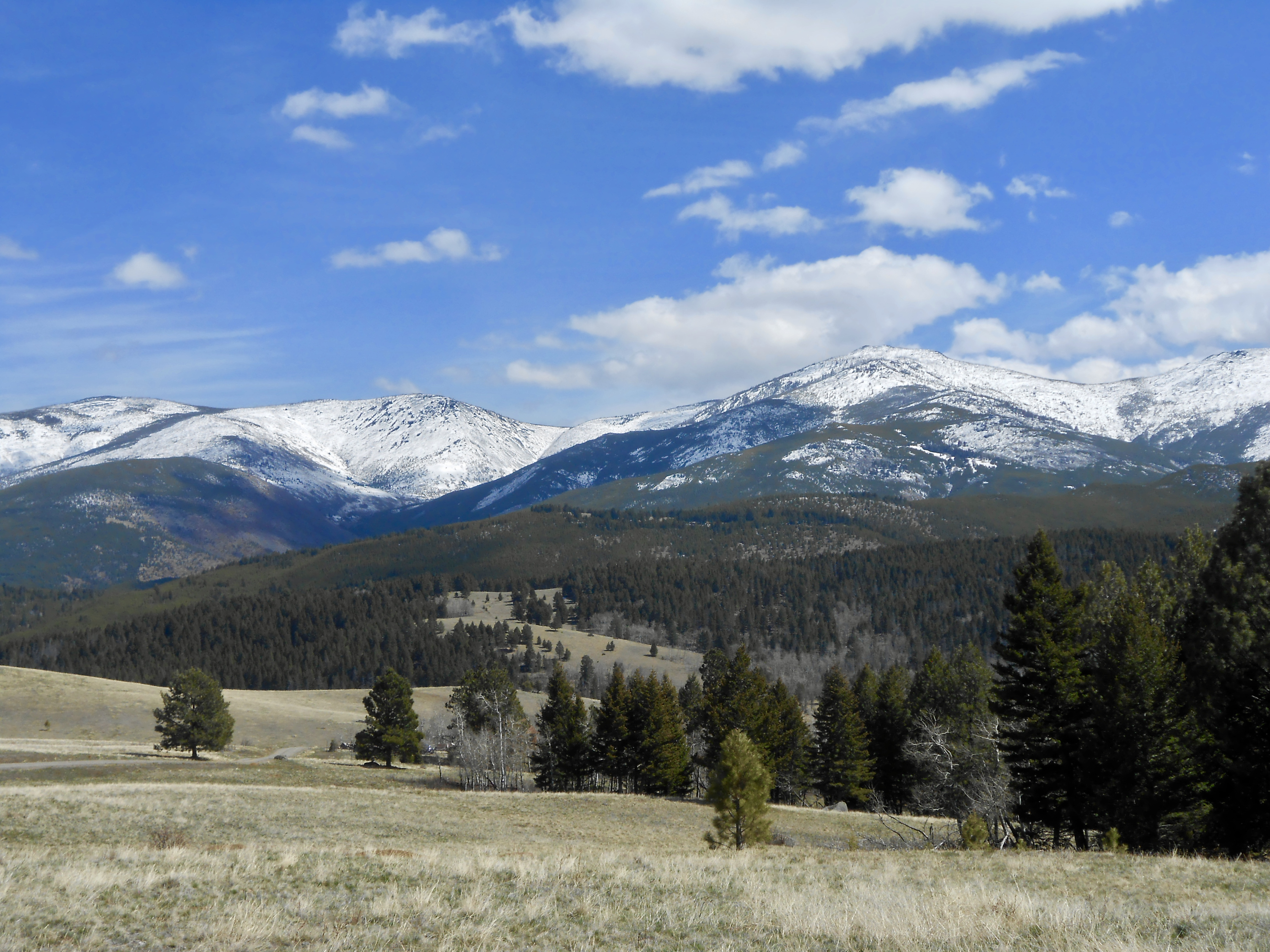
- West side of the Elkhorns as viewed from Jefferson County, Montana

Highest point
- Peak: Crow Peak
- Elevation: 9,414 ft (2,869 m)
- Coordinates: 46°17′38″N 111°54′15″W

Geography
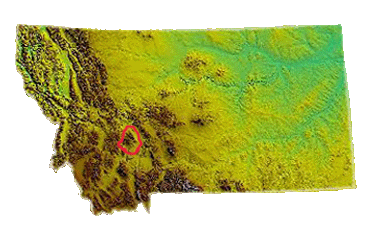
- Country: United States
- State: Montana
- Parent range: Rocky Mountains

Geology
- Rock age: Late Cretaceous

The Elkhorn Mountains are a mountain range in southwestern Montana, part of the Rocky Mountains and are roughly 300,000 acres (1200 km^{2}) in size. It is an inactive volcanic mountain range with the highest point being Crow Peak at 9,414 ft (2,869 m), right next to Elkhorn Peak, 9,381 ft (2,859 m). The range is surrounded by the cities of Helena, Montana City, Townsend, Whitehall, and Boulder. The majority of the range is public land including portions in the Helena-Lewis and Clark National Forest, the Beaverhead-Deerlodge National Forest, Bureau of Land Management, and state lands. The majority of the range is in Montana's Jefferson County, while the eastern portion is in Broadwater County, Montana.

== Geology ==
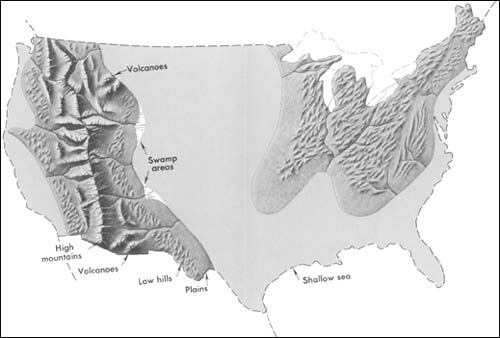
Late Cretaceous paleogeographic map of the United States, showing Elkhorn volcanoes in the northwest

The rocks of the Elkhorns were formed about 74 to 81 million years ago (Late Cretaceous time) as a result of the Farallon tectonic plate subducting beneath western North America and allowing magma to rise to the surface. The Elkhorn Mountains Volcanics are extrusive rocks related to the plutonic granites of the Boulder Batholith. Fossilized dinosaurs killed by ash from the Elkhorn volcanoes have been found at Egg Mountain near Choteau, Montana. Volcanic flows, lahars, and ash falls from sources are thickest within a radius of about 60 miles (97 km) from the Elkhorns. The volcanics probably originally covered an area of about 100 miles (160 km) in diameter. Mineral deposits associated with the Elkhorn Mountains Volcanics include silver mined at Elkhorn, Montana, copper mined at Butte, and gold at the Golden Sunlight Mine near Whitehall, which is associated with a breccia pipe in the volcanics.

The mountain range seen today is related to regional structural uplift dating mostly to Oligocene time.

== History ==
Evidence of human settlement in the area dates back to over 12,000 years before present. The area was included in the 1804 Louisiana Purchase. The area was designated as common hunting ground per the Treaty with the Blackfeet of 1855. In the 1860s, discovery of gold brought many prospectors into the area. A silver boom followed in the 1869. Silver miners named the Elkhorn Mountains because of the large number of elk (wapati) found there. At its peak, the town of Elkhorn, now a ghost town, had 2500 inhabitants.

== The Land ==
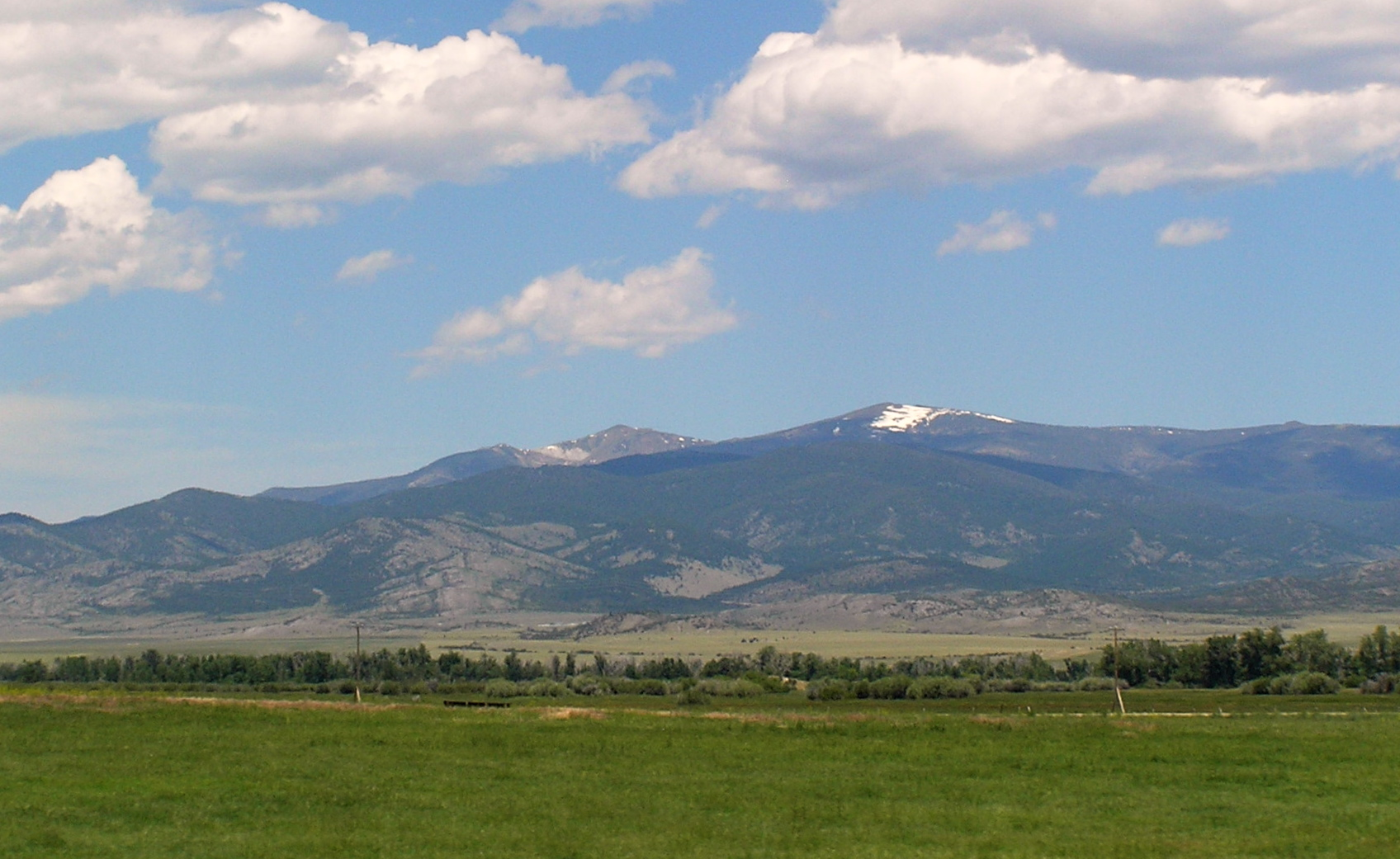
South face of the Elkhorns as seen from outside Boulder, Montana.

A forest fire in 1988 burned 47,000 acres (190 km^{2}) of the mountain range, leaving carpets of seedlings growing into new lodgepole pine forests. The land has been used extensively in the past for gold and silver mining, logging, and open range grazing, leaving a noticeable impact; most notably the abandoned mining town of Elkhorn. Recently with efforts conducted by the BLM, Montana FWP and Helena National Forest, new conservation and wildlife management plans have been put into place including big horn sheep reintroduction and the westslope cutthroat trout restoration program. Management of the 2000+ elk herd in the area and the suppression of noxious weeds is also an ongoing task.

Despite the impacts of mining, around 100,000 acres of the Elkhorns were still roadless in 1992; this included 85,000 acres of roadless National Forest land as well as adjacent BLM, state and private lands. Congress designated 175,000 acres of the range as the "Elkhorns Wildlife Management Area," and one of Montana's most productive elk herds inhabits the range. Because the Elkhorns are higher in elevation than the nearby section of the Continental Divide, they catch more moisture than do most other ranges east of the Divide. For this reason, the Elkhorns are especially diverse, with 148 documented vertebrate species.

== Climate ==
Tizer Basin is a SNOTEL weather station situated by Big Tizer Creek near Bullock Hill. 7,917 ft (2,413 m), Tizer Basin has a subalpine climate (Köppen Dfc).

Climate data for Tizer Basin, Montana, 1991–2020 normals, 1988-2020 extremes: 6880ft (2097m)
Month	Jan	Feb	Mar	Apr	May	Jun	Jul	Aug	Sep	Oct	Nov	Dec	Year
Record high °F (°C)	61 (16)	58 (14)	62 (17)	70 (21)	78 (26)	87 (31)	88 (31)	87 (31)	86 (30)	77 (25)	65 (18)	53 (12)	88 (31)
Mean maximum °F (°C)	49.1 (9.5)	48.3 (9.1)	55.0 (12.8)	62.5 (16.9)	71.1 (21.7)	77.4 (25.2)	82.7 (28.2)	81.9 (27.7)	77.4 (25.2)	67.4 (19.7)	54.7 (12.6)	46.4 (8.0)	83.8 (28.8)
Mean daily maximum °F (°C)	32.3 (0.2)	33.0 (0.6)	40.0 (4.4)	45.5 (7.5)	54.2 (12.3)	62.1 (16.7)	72.0 (22.2)	71.1 (21.7)	61.4 (16.3)	48.0 (8.9)	37.5 (3.1)	31.0 (−0.6)	49.0 (9.4)
Daily mean °F (°C)	22.7 (−5.2)	22.2 (−5.4)	28.5 (−1.9)	33.9 (1.1)	42.1 (5.6)	49.2 (9.6)	57.0 (13.9)	55.8 (13.2)	48.0 (8.9)	37.0 (2.8)	27.7 (−2.4)	21.5 (−5.8)	37.1 (2.9)
Mean daily minimum °F (°C)	13.1 (−10.5)	11.3 (−11.5)	16.9 (−8.4)	22.3 (−5.4)	30.0 (−1.1)	36.3 (2.4)	41.8 (5.4)	40.6 (4.8)	34.5 (1.4)	26.0 (−3.3)	17.8 (−7.9)	11.9 (−11.2)	25.2 (−3.8)
Mean minimum °F (°C)	−12.2 (−24.6)	−12.9 (−24.9)	−5.4 (−20.8)	5.6 (−14.7)	17.7 (−7.9)	27.5 (−2.5)	32.8 (0.4)	30.5 (−0.8)	22.3 (−5.4)	7.3 (−13.7)	−4.8 (−20.4)	−13.0 (−25.0)	−24.1 (−31.2)
Record low °F (°C)	−27 (−33)	−42 (−41)	−28 (−33)	−10 (−23)	3 (−16)	23 (−5)	25 (−4)	17 (−8)	10 (−12)	−18 (−28)	−25 (−32)	−37 (−38)	−42 (−41)
Average precipitation inches (mm)	1.33 (34)	1.43 (36)	1.95 (50)	3.13 (80)	3.46 (88)	4.01 (102)	1.96 (50)	1.55 (39)	1.73 (44)	2.12 (54)	1.88 (48)	1.56 (40)	26.11 (665)
Source 1: XMACIS2
Source 2: NOAA (Precipitation)

== See also ==
- List of mountain ranges in Montana
