= Montana Highway 55 =

State highway in Montana, United States

Montana Highway 55
- MT 55 highlighted in red

Route information
- Maintained by MDT
- Length: 12.996 mi (20.915 km)

Major junctions
- South end: MT 41 north of Silver Star
- North end: I-90 at Whitehall

Location
- Country: United States
- State: Montana
- Counties: Madison, Silver Bow, Jefferson

Highway system
- Montana Highway System; Interstate; US; State; Secondary
← MT 49	→ MT 56

Highway 55 (MT 55) in the U.S. State of Montana is a route running in a northerly direction from an intersection with MT 41 about 4 miles (6.4 km) north of the small town of Silver Star. The highway extends approximately 13 miles (21 km) to an interchange with Interstate 90 (I-90) at the north edge of the town of Whitehall. The route traverses largely agricultural land in the Jefferson River valley.

== Route description ==
Highway 55 begins at MT 41, north of Silver Star. Concurrent with Montana Highway 287, it intersects Cut Across Road. An intersection with Waterloo Road is not far off as Highway 55 proceeds northward. From the west intersects Jack Rabbit Lane, before intersecting Fish Creek Road. It intersects Airport Lane before intersecting Cape Lane. After intersecting several small roads, Highway 55 ends at I-90 at Whitehall.

== History ==
Before receiving its current designation, Highway 55 was designated as part of Montana Highway 287. A small segment of Highway 55 in Whitehall was a former alignment of U.S. Route 10, before U.S. 10 was deleted across Montana.

== Major intersections ==
County	Location	mi	km	Destinations	Notes
Madison		0.000	0.000	MT 41 – Twin Bridges, Butte	
Silver Bow	No major junctions				
Jefferson		12.032	19.364	MT 2 west – Butte	Western end of MT 2 overlap
Jefferson	Whitehall	12.446	20.030	MT 69 east (MT 2) – Cardwell	Eastern end of MT 2 overlap
Jefferson	Whitehall	12.996	20.915	I-90 – Butte, Billings	
1.000 mi = 1.609 km; 1.000 km = 0.621 mi: Concurrency terminus
