= Elkhorn, Montana =

- Census-designated place
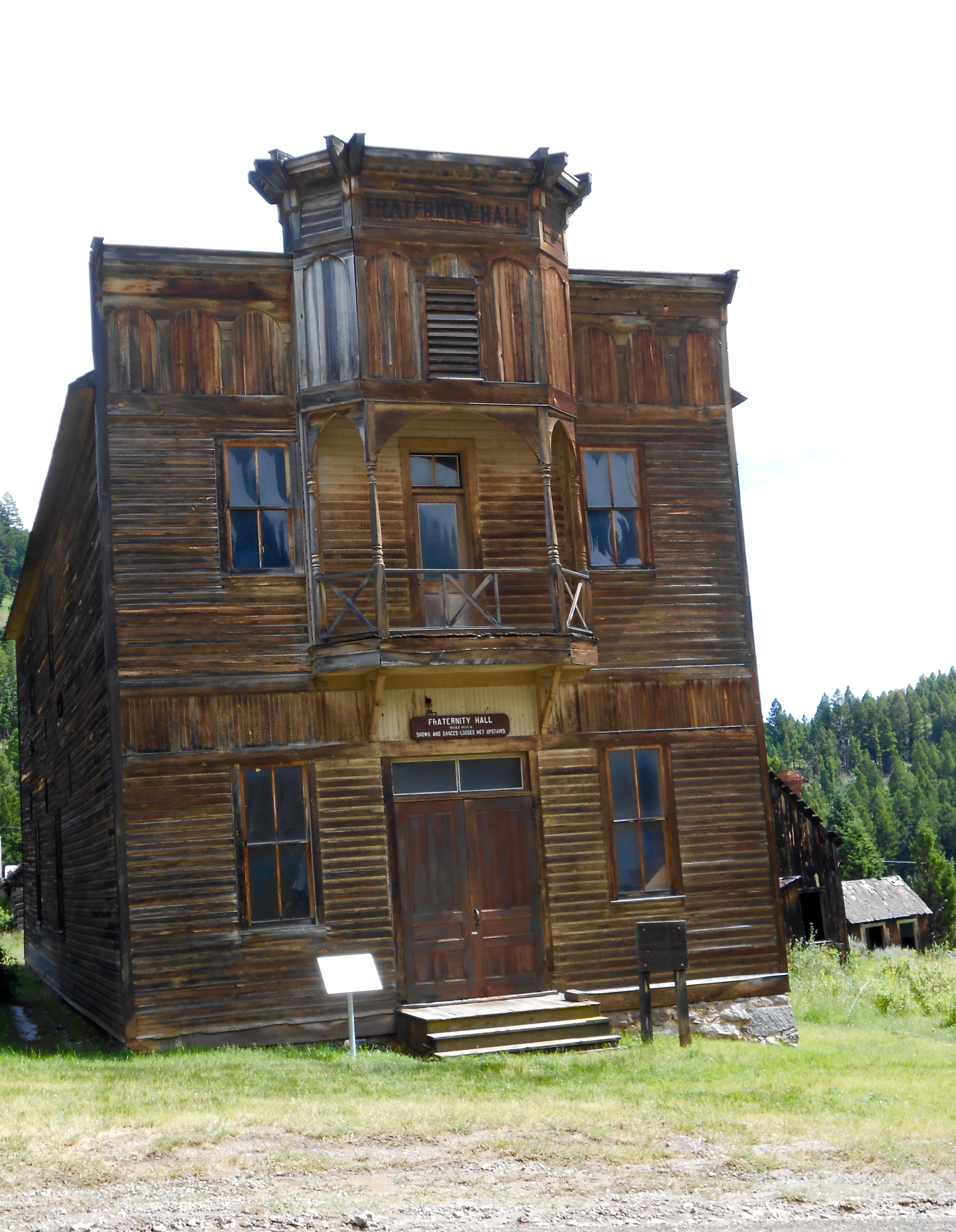
- Fraternity Hall

- Location within Montana Location within the United States
- Coordinates: 46°16′29″N 111°56′45″W
- Country: United States
- State: Montana
- County: Jefferson
- Established: 1872
- Named for: Elkhorn Mountains

Area
  - Total: 6.74 sq mi (17.46 km^{2})
  - Land: 6.74 sq mi (17.46 km^{2})
  - Water: 0 sq mi (0.00 km^{2})
- Elevation: 6,444 ft (1,964 m)

Population (2020)
  - Total: 12
  - Density: 1.8/sq mi (0.69/km^{2})
- Time zone: UTC-7 (Mountain (MST))
  - Summer (DST): UTC-6 (MDT)
- Area code: 406
- FIPS code: 30-23865
- GNIS feature ID: 0783128

Elkhorn is a census-designated place (CDP) in Jefferson County, Montana, United States, in the Elkhorn Mountains of the southwestern part of the state. It was originally established as a mining town in the 19th century. As of the 2020 census, Elkhorn had a population of 12. The community is considered a ghost town, and two of its buildings are preserved as Elkhorn State Park.

== History ==
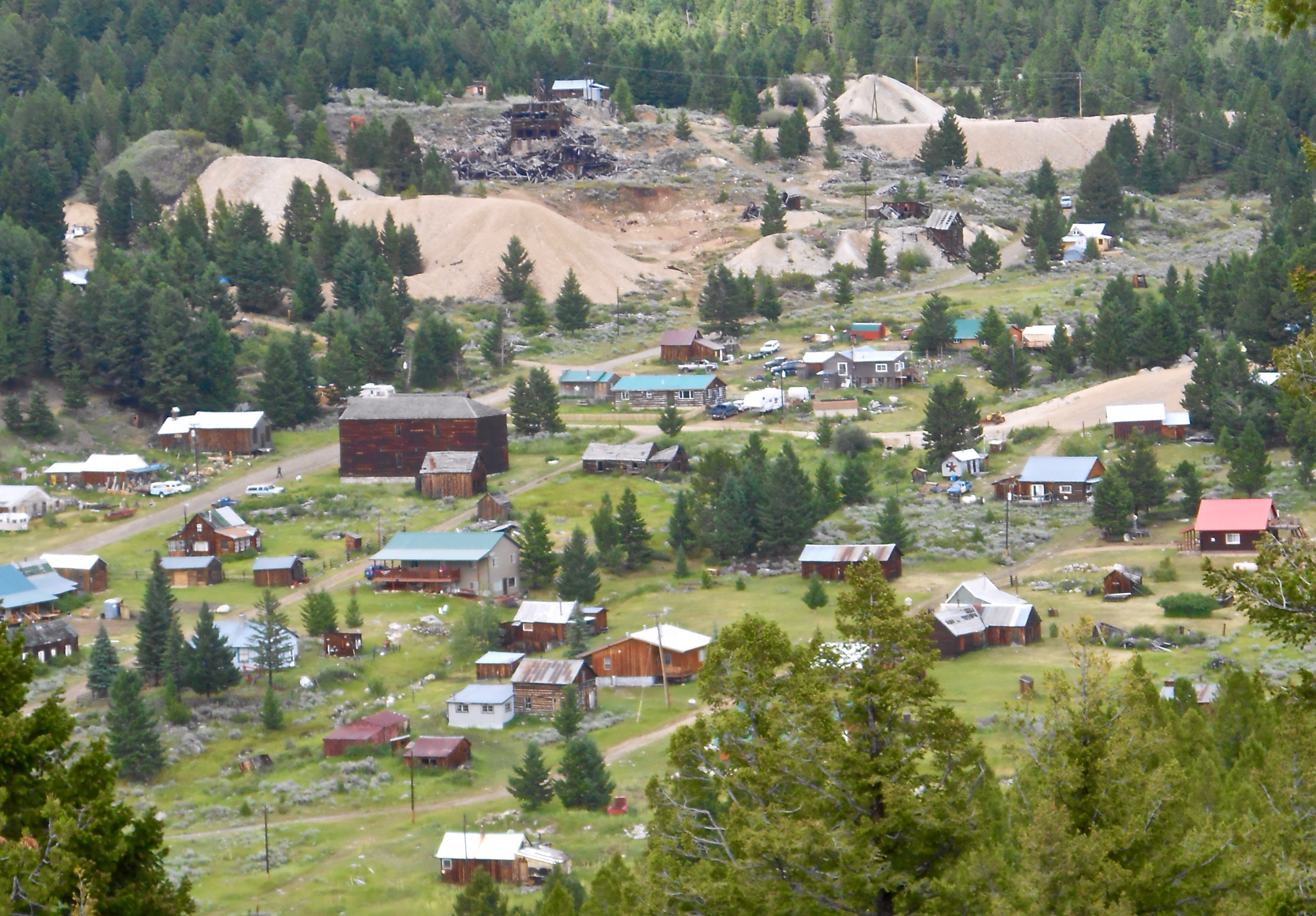
Elkhorn in 2015

Lodes of silver, described by geologists as supergene enrichments, were initially discovered in the Elkhorn Mountains by Peter Wys, a Swiss immigrant. Six years later, Anton Holter, a pioneer capitalist from Helena, began developing the mine. Over $14 million in silver was carried from the mine. In 1890, the Sherman Silver Purchase Act passed, creating a high demand for Elkhorn's silver.

During this peak period, Elkhorn had 2,500 inhabitants, a school, a hotel, a church, stores, saloons, and brothels. Unlike most mining towns, Elkhorn was populated mostly by families of married European immigrants. In 1893, the Fraternity Hall was constructed for social gatherings, and still remains as one of the most well-preserved buildings in modern Elkhorn.

In the years following, the silver boom and Elkhorn's prosperity began to lessen as the desire for silver decreased. A diphtheria epidemic struck Elkhorn in the winter of 1888–1889, resulting in many deaths, particularly of children. Soon after, railroad service to Elkhorn was halted and only a fraction of the original inhabitants remained.

The state of Montana designated Fraternity Hall and Gillian Hall as Elkhorn State Park in 1980.

== Geography ==
Elkhorn is in eastern Jefferson County on the south side of the Elkhorn Mountains, in the valley of Elkhorn Creek. It can only be reached through its neighboring town, Boulder, by taking the I-15 exit for Boulder, continuing 7 miles (11 km) southeast on Montana Highway 69, then 11 miles (18 km) north on graveled county roads.

According to the U.S. Census Bureau, the Elkhorn CDP has an area of 6.8 square miles (17.5 km^{2}), all land.

== Demographics ==
Historical population
Census	Pop.	Note	%±
2010	10		—
2020	12		20.0%
U.S. Decennial Census

While minimal standing buildings remain of the original Elkhorn, some of its cabins have been reoccupied and refurbished. In 2010, there were 10 inhabitants.

== Education ==
The school districts for the community are Boulder Elementary School District and Jefferson High School District.

== See also ==
- List of ghost towns in Montana
- Montana Ghost Town Preservation Society
