= Montana Highway 68 =

State highway in Montana, United States

Montana Highway 68
- MT 68 highlighted in red

Route information
- Maintained by MDT
- Length: 1.494 mi (2.404 km)

Major junctions
- South end: I-15 in Cascade
- S-330 in Cascade
- North end: I-15 north of Cascade

Location
- Country: United States
- State: Montana
- Counties: Cascade

Highway system
- Montana Highway System; Interstate; US; State; Secondary
← MT 67	→ MT 69

Montana Highway 68 (MT 68) is a 1.494-mile-long (2.404 km) state highway in the US state of Montana. The southern terminus is at Interstate 15 (I-15) in Cascade and the northern terminus is at I-15 north of Cascade.

== Major intersections ==
The entire highway is in Cascade County.

Location	mi	km	Destinations	Notes
Cascade	0.000	0.000	I-15 – Helena, Great Falls	Southern terminus; I-15 exit 254
Cascade	1.180	1.899	S-330 east (Central Avenue)	Western terminus of S-330
	1.494	2.404	I-15 – Helena, Great Falls	Northern terminus; I-15 exit 256
1.000 mi = 1.609 km; 1.000 km = 0.621 mi
