= Purple Heart Trail =

Purple Heart Trail are roads, highways, bridges, and other monuments that have been designated to honor men and women who have been awarded the Purple Heart medal. Signs have been placed along the "trail" so travellers can see that this site and way has been set aside for remembrance. There are "trails" in 45 states and Guam. State legislation was passed in each state to set which roads are part of The Purple Heart Trail.

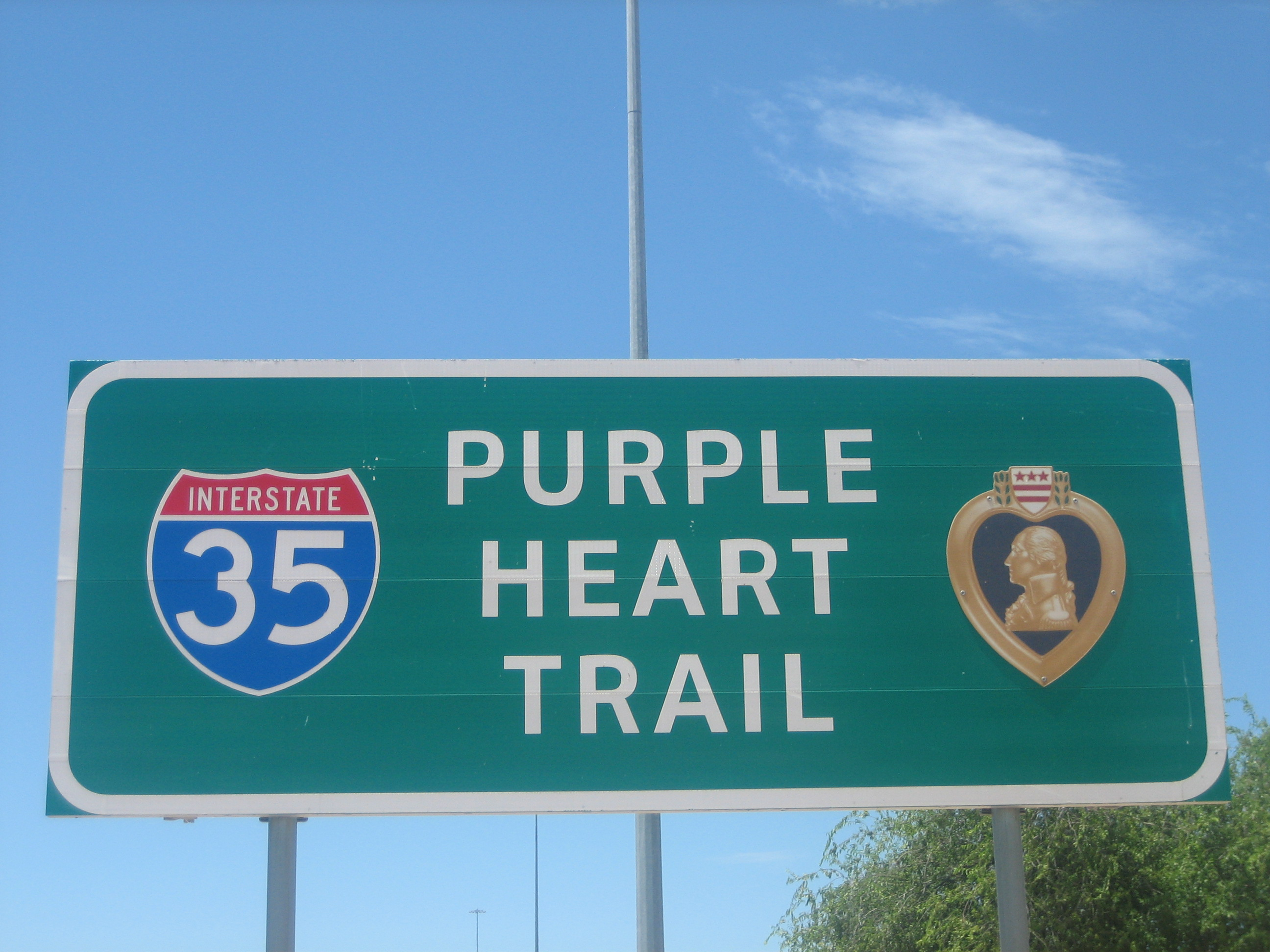
Sign on Interstate 35 designating the Purple Heart Trail.

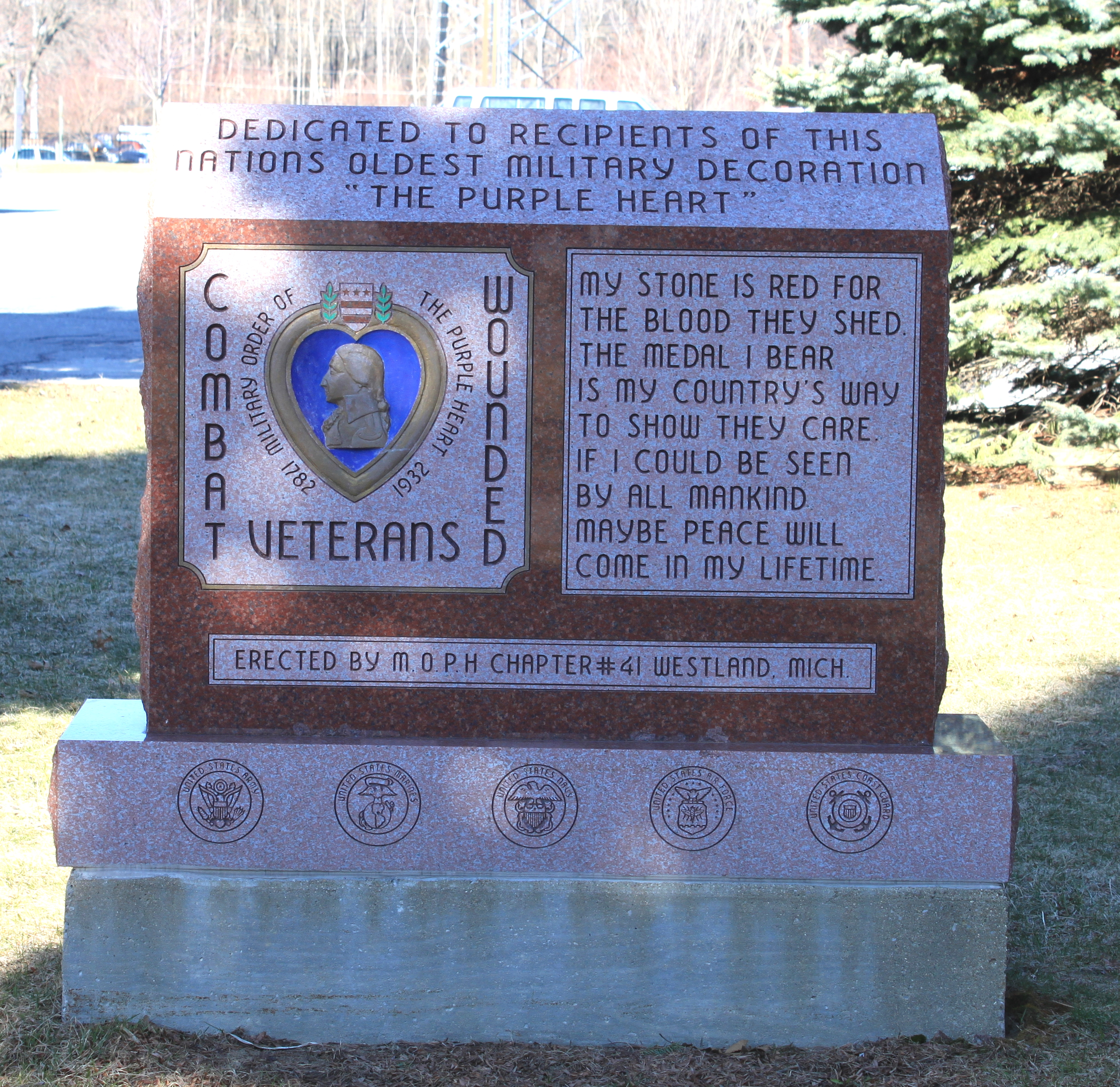
Purple Heart Memorial, Westland, Michigan

Purple Heart Trail roads and highways are located on:

- Interstate 5 in California, Oregon and Washington
- Interstate 10 in Alabama and Arizona
- Interstate 15 in Montana
  - Interstate 115 in Montana
  - Interstate 315 in Montana
- Interstate 35 in Kansas and Texas
  - Interstate 35E in Texas
  - Interstate 35W in Texas
  - Interstate 135 in Kansas
  - Interstate 235 in Kansas
  - Interstate 335 in Kansas
  - Interstate 435 in Kansas
  - Interstate 635 in Kansas
- Interstate 40 in Arizona, Arkansas, Oklahoma, New Mexico and Texas
- Interstate 44 in Missouri
- Interstate 64 in Kentucky, West Virginia, and Virginia
- Interstate 65 in Alabama
  - Interstate 265 in Kentucky
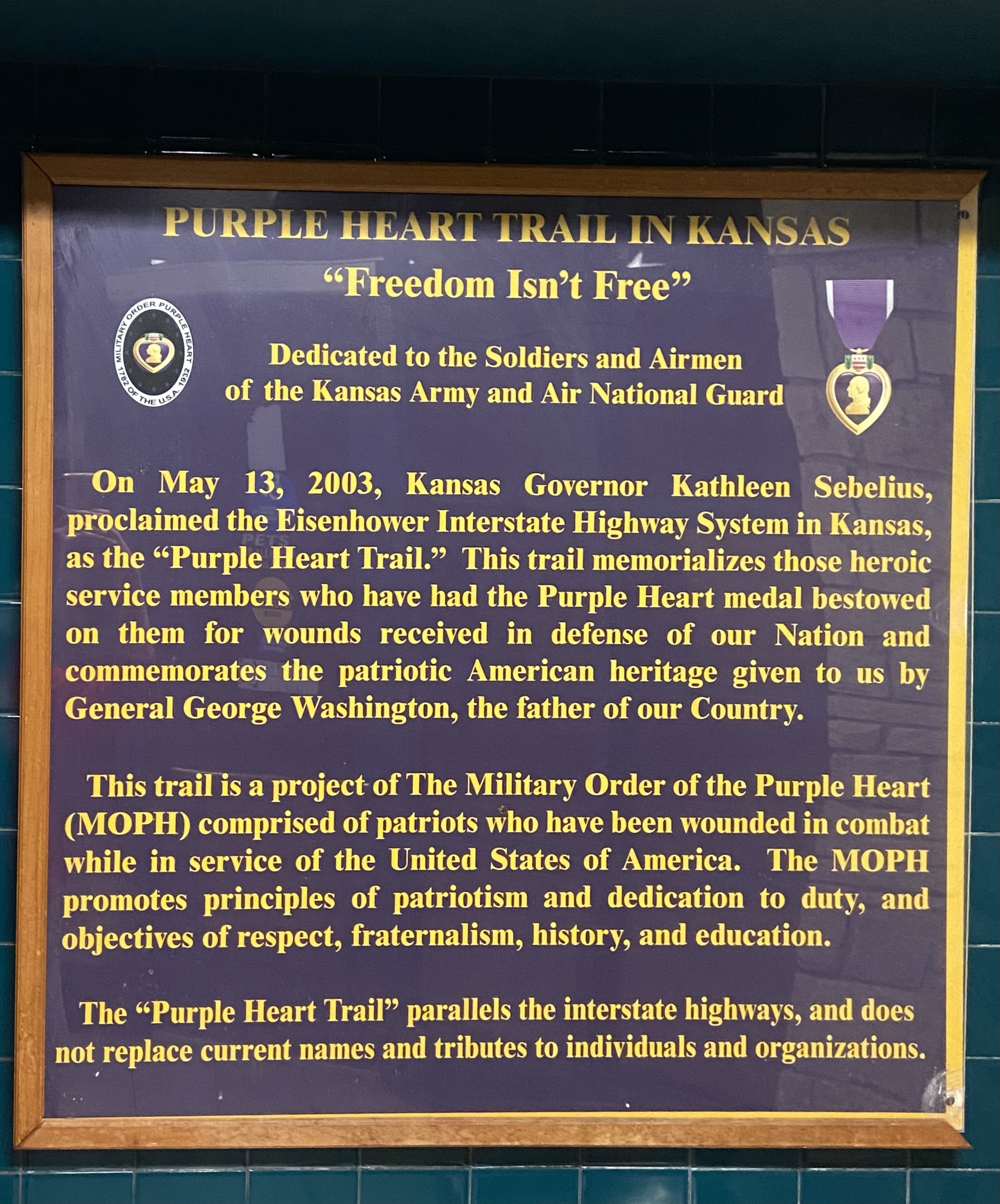
- Purple Heart Trail in Paxico, Kansas
  Interstate 70 in Colorado, Kansas, Missouri and Ohio
  - Interstate 470 in Kansas
  - Interstate 670 in Kansas
- Interstate 71 in Ohio
- Interstate 72 in Illinois
- Interstate 75 in Florida
- Interstate 80 in California, Nevada, Utah and Wyoming
- Interstate 84 in parts of New York
- Interstate 90 in Idaho, Montana, South Dakota and Wyoming
- Interstate 94 in Montana and Minnesota
- Interstate 95 in Maryland, New Hampshire, North Carolina, Rhode Island, South Carolina and parts of Virginia
- State Route 232 in Georgia
- Portions of State Route 2 in Alaska
- Interstate 555 in Arkansas
