= Donald, Montana =

Unincorporated community in Montana, U.S.

Coordinates: 45°50′42″N 112°25′39″W

Donald is an unincorporated community in Jefferson County, in the U.S. state of Montana. It is located on Montana Highway 2, 15 miles south of Butte. It is near the Beaver Ponds Trailhead and Toll Mountain in the Beaverhead–Deerlodge National Forest.

== History ==
The community was named in honor of Donald A. McIntosh, a railroad contractor.
