= Silver Star, Montana =

- Census-designated place
- Location within Montana Location within the United States
- Coordinates: 45°41′15″N 112°17′06″W
- Country: United States
- State: Montana
- County: Madison

Area
  - Total: 0.46 sq mi (1.19 km^{2})
  - Land: 0.46 sq mi (1.19 km^{2})
  - Water: 0 sq mi (0.00 km^{2})
- Elevation: 4,534 ft (1,382 m)

Population (2020)
  - Total: 46
  - Density: 100.1/sq mi (38.64/km^{2})
- Time zone: UTC-7 (Mountain (MST))
  - Summer (DST): UTC-6 (MDT)
- ZIP code: 59751
- Area code: 406
- GNIS feature ID: 2806647
- FIPS code: 30-68500

Silver Star is an unincorporated community and census-designated place in Madison County, Montana, United States. As of the 2020 census, it had a population of 46. It is located on Montana Highway 41, 10 miles (16 km) north-northeast of Twin Bridges and 16 miles (26 km) southwest of Whitehall. The community has a post office with ZIP code 59751.

Green Campbell made the first gold discovery in this area in 1866. The community was named for the Silver Star mining claim. The post office opened in 1869.

== Geography ==
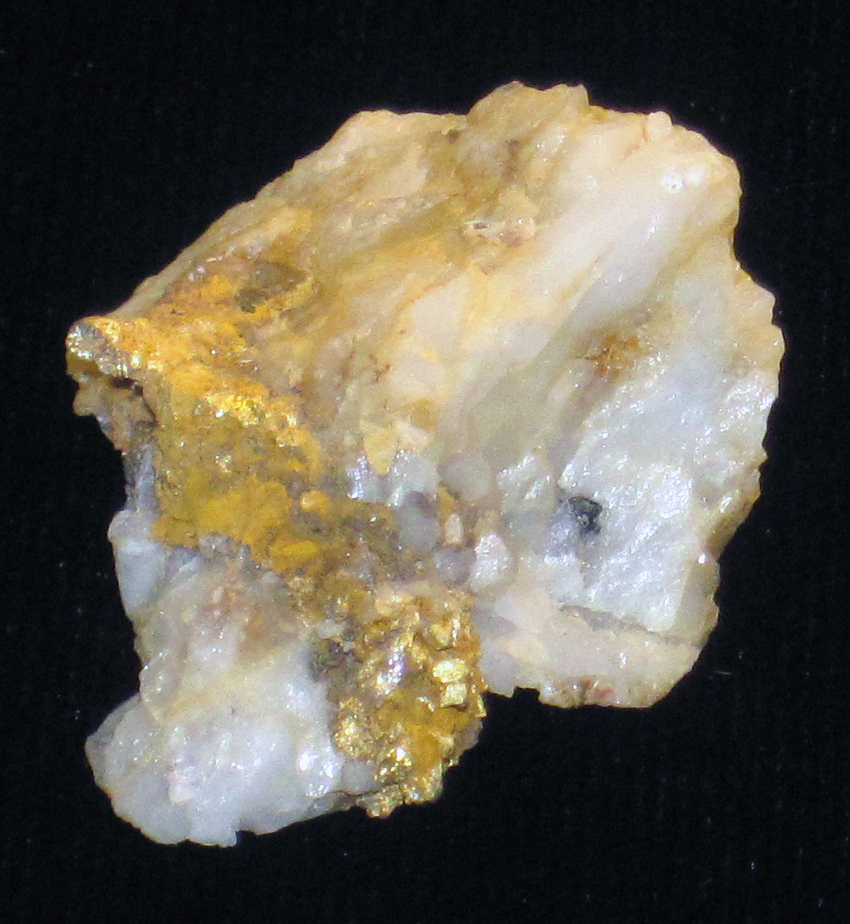
Gold and quartz from the Broadway Mine, Silver Star, Montana

Silver Star is in northwestern Madison County, on the west bank of the Jefferson River, one of the three headwater tributaries of the Missouri River. The Highland Mountains rise to the west of the community. According to the U.S. Census Bureau, the Silver Star CDP has an area of 0.46 square miles (1.19 km^{2}), all land.

== Demographics ==
Historical population
Census	Pop.	Note	%±
2020	46		—
U.S. Decennial Census

== Education ==
The CDP is in the Twin Bridges K-12 Schools school district.
