= Montana Highway 2 =

State highway in Montana, United States

Montana Highway 2
- MT 2 highlighted in red

Route information
- Maintained by MDT
- Length: 64.6450 mi (104.0360 km)

Major junctions
- West end: I-15 BL / I-90 BL in Butte
- I-15 / I-90 in Butte; I-90 in Whitehall; US 287 in Three Forks
- East end: I-90 / S-205 in Three Forks

Location
- Country: United States
- State: Montana
- Counties: Silver Bow, Jefferson, Broadwater, Gallatin

Highway system
- Montana Highway System; Interstate; US; State; Secondary
← US 2	→ MT 3

Montana Highway 2 (MT 2) is a 64.65-mile-long (104.04 km) state highway in the southern part of the U.S. state of Montana. It extends from Interstate 15 Business (I-15 BL) and I-90 BL in Butte to Interstate 90 in Three Forks. Previously, this roadway was a part of U.S. Route 10 (US 10). Sections of MT 2 are unsigned.

== Route description ==
MT 2 begins in downtown Butte at the intersection of Park Street and Montana Street, and travels concurrently with 1-15 BL and I-90 BL to an interchange with I-15 and I-90, which also travels concurrently through the city. The highway heads south and then southeast through rural Silver Bow County. The highway crosses Pipestone Pass and enters Jefferson County. It travels through Whitehall and Cardwell. As it nears Three Forks, MT 2 meets US 287 and the two highways travel concurrently for approximately ten miles (16 km). Just west of Three Forks, MT 2 splits away from US 287 and then enters the city. The highway ends at another interchange with I-90; the roadway continues as Secondary Highway 205 (S-205).

== Major intersections ==
County	Location	mi	km	Destinations	Notes
Silver Bow	Butte	0.0000	0.0000	I-15 BL south / I-90 BL west (Montana Street) / Park Street	MT 2 western terminus; western end of I-15 BL / I-90 BL concurrency
Silver Bow	Butte	2.9284	4.7128	I-15 / I-90 / I-15 BL ends / I-90 BL ends	I-15 exit 127; I-15 BL southern terminus; I-90 BL eastern terminus; eastern end of I-15 BL / I-90 BL concurrency
Silver Bow	Butte	5.9326	9.5476	S-393 south	
Jefferson		23.3084	37.5112	MT 41 south – Twin Bridges, Virginia City	
Jefferson		31.6700	50.9679	MT 55 south – Virginia City, Dillon	Western end of MT 55 concurrency
Jefferson	Whitehall	32.0731	51.6167	MT 55 north / MT 69 begins	Eastern end of MT 55 concurrency; western end of MT 69 concurrency
Jefferson		38.1668	61.4235	MT 69 north / S-359 begins – Boulder	Eastern end of MT 69 concurrency; western end of S-359 concurrency
Jefferson	Cardwell	39.4272	63.4519	I-90 – Butte, Billings	I-90 exit 256
Jefferson	Cardwell	39.4937	63.5589	S-359 south	Eastern end of S-359 concurrency
Jefferson		50.7763	81.7165	US 287 south – Ennis, Yellowstone National Park	Western end of US 287 concurrency
Broadwater		60.5167	97.3922	US 287 north – Helena	Eastern end of US 287 concurrency
Gallatin	Three Forks	63.4071	102.0438	S-287 south – Willow Creek	
Gallatin	Three Forks	64.6450	104.0360	I-90 – Butte, Billings S-205 east – Trident	MT 2 eastern terminus; I-90 exit 278, continues as S-205
1.000 mi = 1.609 km; 1.000 km = 0.621 mi: Concurrency terminus
