= Modern Hotel =

- U.S. National Register of Historic Places
- Location within Montana Location within the United States
- Location: Legion Ave. & Main St., Whitehall, Montana
- Coordinates: 45°52′11″N 112°05′58″W
- Built: 1913
- NRHP reference No.: 11000951
- Added to NRHP: December 22, 2011

The Modern Hotel is a site on the National Register of Historic Places in Whitehall, Montana. It was added to the National Register on December 22, 2011.

It was later named Borden's Hotel and in 2013 received tax credit and loan funding to be renovated, with the renovation to create nine apartments above commercial units.
