= Monida, Montana =

Unincorporated community in Montana, United States

- Unincorporated community
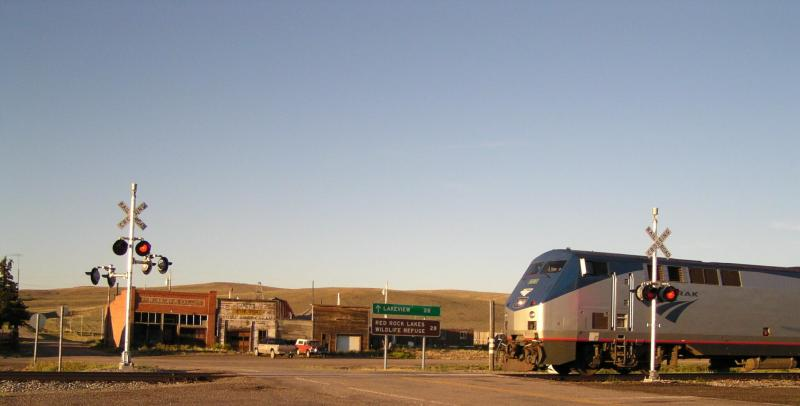
- American Orient Express in Monida

- Location within Montana Location within the United States
- Coordinates: 44°33′43″N 112°18′49″W
- Country: United States
- State: Montana
- County: Beaverhead
- Elevation: 6,788 ft (2,069 m)

Population (2010)
  - Total: 6
- Time zone: UTC-7 (Mountain (MST))
  - Summer (DST): UTC-6 (MDT)
- Area code: 406
- GNIS feature ID: 787554

Monida is an unincorporated community in Beaverhead County, Montana, United States. Monida is located on Interstate 15 at the top of Monida Pass, 14.7 miles (23.7 km) east-southeast of Lima. The community is situated on the Continental Divide at the Idaho state line. It has a permanent population of six. It also serves as the southernmost settlement in the state.

== History ==
The Monida post office opened in 1891. In the late 1800's and early 1900's for about ten years, a train would stop and drop off passengers who could ride a stagecoach to Yellowstone National Park. The business died out because of the new era of motorized vehicles being introduced and also a new train station closer to the park. Cowboys also would run their cattle through the town, and it also had lots of garages. While its main business had faded away, people still lived and thrived there, and sources on the internet show that it had a grocery store, post office, café, and more. The name derives from the first three letters of Montana and Idaho. There is a deep history and once was a bustling town for tourism and cattle.
