= W.C. Child Ranch =

- W.C. Child Ranch/Kleffner Ranch
- U.S. National Register of Historic Places
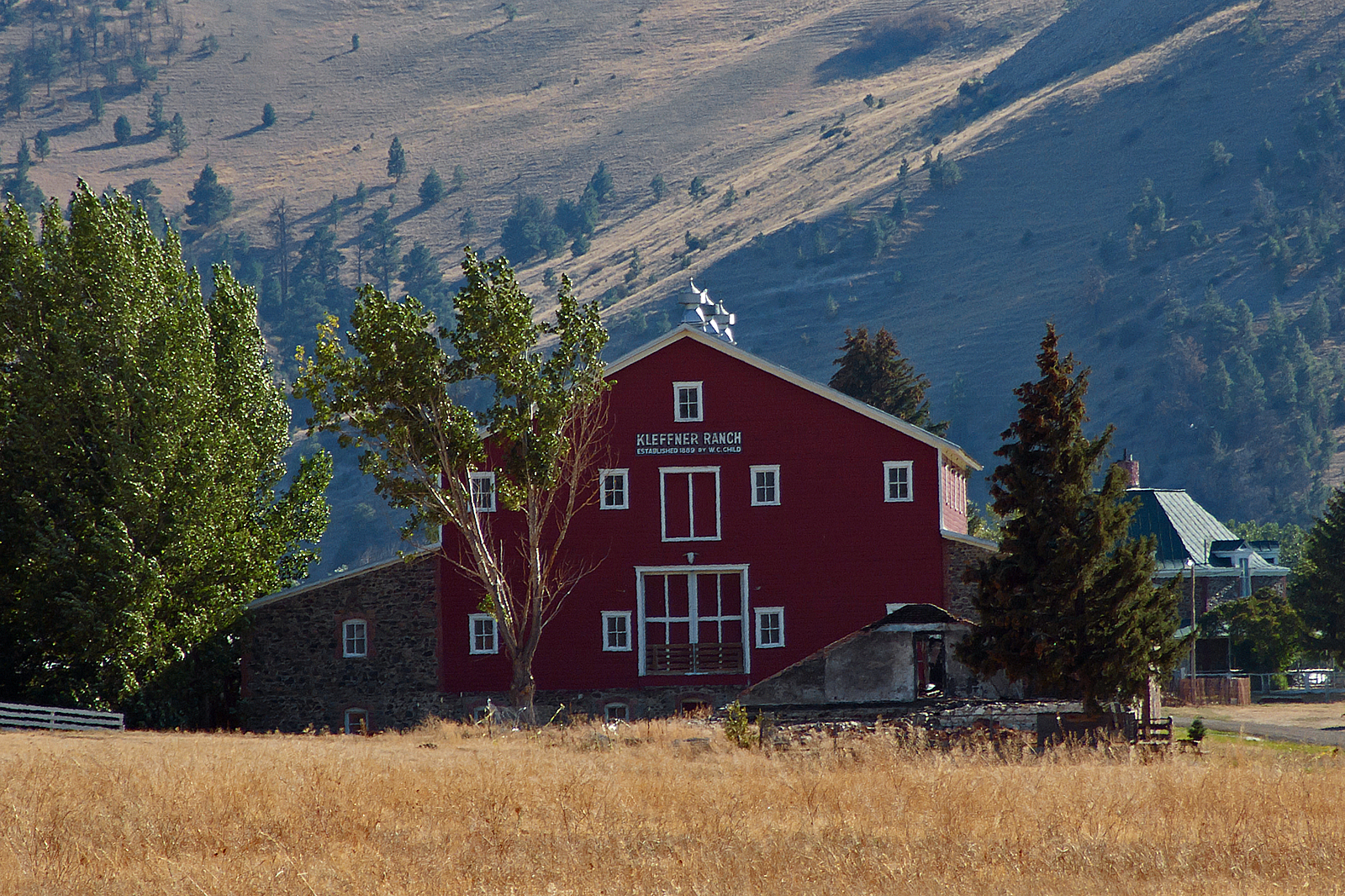
- Stone barn at the Kleffner Ranch

- Location within Montana Location within the United States
- Location: South of East Helena on Montana Highway 518
- Coordinates: 46°34′05″N 111°54′42″W
- NRHP reference No.: 04001435
- Added to NRHP: November 23, 1977

The W.C. Child Ranch also known as the Kleffner Ranch and the Child-Kleffner Ranch is a national historic site located on state highway 518, south of East Helena, Montana, United States. It was added to the National Register of Historic Places on November 23, 1977.

The ranch was purchased by W. C. Child about 1885, and was originally named "White Face Farm". Child was one of the first ranchers to raise purebred Hereford cattle in Montana Territory. After the very harsh Winter of 1886–87, he built a 27,000-square-foot (2,500 m^{2}), 55 feet (17 m) high barn with a fieldstone foundation. It could house 500 head of cattle and up to 350 tons (320 t) of hay. In 1888 he also built an octagonal-shaped house on the property, with the second floor given over to an open ballroom.

Child lived in Helena and used the home only for meetings and parties. He went bankrupt as a result of the Silver Panic of 1893 and died in October, 1893, after which the ranch was sold to a number of different owners over the next fifty years. The property's condition deteriorated, until Paul Kleffner obtained the ranch in 1943, first leasing it and then buying it outright in 1946. Kleffner and his family owned the ranch until 2005, when it was bought by Denis and Stacy Young. The site is now primary used as a venue to host events such as weddings.
