= Fraternity Hall =

- U.S. National Register of Historic Places
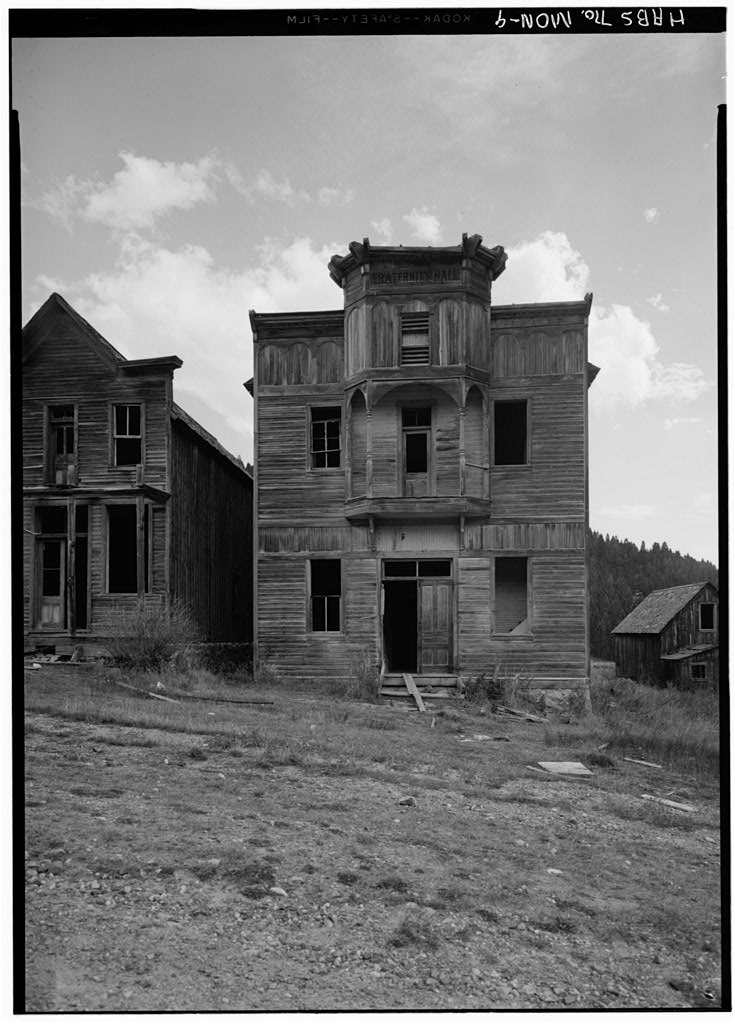

- Location within Montana Location within the United States
- Location: Main St., Elkhorn, Montana
- Coordinates: 46°16′30″N 111°56′44″W
- Area: less than one acre
- Built: c.1893
- Architectural style: Greek Revival
- NRHP reference No.: 75001084
- Added to NRHP: April 3, 1975

Fraternity Hall is a historic building located in Elkhorn, Montana. It was originally used as a dance hall and meeting place for various fraternal orders. It is now part of Elkhorn State Park. The building was added to the National Register of Historic Places in 1975.

== History ==
The Fraternity Hall Association of Elkhorn was organized and incorporated on May 8, 1893, in Elkhorn, Montana, to purchase land, construct, and manage a building that the numerous fraternal organizations in the town could use. The result was Fraternity Hall, which was built sometime in the 1890s.

The first floor of Fraternity Hall was used as a meeting hall, community dance hall, and for theatrical presentations. The second floor served as a lodge meeting hall for such groups as the Masons, Knights of Pythias, IOOF, IOGT, Sons of St. Georges, and the Ancient Order of United Workmen."

After the building had been vacant for years, it was purchased by the Western Montana Ghost Town Preservation Society on June 26, 1972, with a loan from the National Trust for Historic Preservation. This action prevented the relocation of Fraternity Hall to another state. The Architectural Record featured Fraternity Hall as number one on a list of twelve structures in the American West that should be saved.

Fraternity Hall was added to the National Register of Historic Places on April 3, 1975. Its National Register nomination asserts that "It is perhaps the most photographed ghost town building in the United States. The building has been featured on the cover of many publications on ghost towns.

Today, Elkhorn, Montana, is considered a ghost town, but it was originally a center for gold and silver mining. The state of Montana designated Fraternity Hall and the adjacent Gillian Hall as Elkhorn State Park on January 7, 1980. Fraternity Hall is owned by the Montana Fish, Wildlife, and Parks.

== Architecture ==
Fraternity Hall was built in Greek Revival style. It is a two-story frame building with a false front that features simulated pilasters and arches, along with an ornate, cantilevered balcony. The roof consists of hand-split wood shakes. The foundation was built using native stone. The building is 28 by 72 feet.
