= Business routes of Interstate 15 =

Interstate 15 Business

Location
- Country: United States

Highway system
- Interstate Highway System; Main; Auxiliary; Suffixed; Business; Future

Interstate 15 Business may refer to several business routes of the Interstate Highway System that connect Interstate 15 with the central business district of various cities bypassed by I-15. The business route in each community is considered a unique route. In many cases, these routes are a former section of a U.S. Route or state highway.

Interstate business routes in California are assigned by the California Department of Transportation (Caltrans), but are not maintained by Caltrans unless they overlay other routes of the state highway system. Local authorities may request route assignment from the Caltrans Transportation System Information Program, and all requests require approval of the executive committee of the American Association of State Highway and Transportation Officials (AASHTO).

== California ==
=== Escondido business loop ===
Interstate 15 Business
- Centre City Parkway
- Location: Escondido, California

Interstate 15 Business (I-15 Bus.) provides access to downtown Escondido, as Centre City Parkway. It follows the former routing of U.S. Route 395 (US 395).

I-15 Bus. begins at I-15 exit 28 near the southern city limits of Escondido. It runs parallel to I-15 north through the city. It intersects both the westbound and eastbound portions of County Route S6, which in this area is split into one-way roads (which are in turn separated by another street). This intersection provides access to the end of the Sprinter hybrid rail service. Shortly thereafter, I-15 Bus. intersects County Route S14, and then interchanges with California State Route 78 (SR 78). The interchange is the last interchange on SR 78 before its freeway status ends, and there are only ramps for a westbound entrance or eastbound exit. Continuing north, I-15 Bus. intersects with El Norte Parkway, a major arterial road, before reconnecting with I-15 at exit 34 near the northern city limits of Escondido. Though the street itself continues northward well on into Temecula as a frontage road for I-15, its designation as I-15 Bus. ends at this interchange.

Major intersections
The entire route is in Escondido, San Diego County.

mi	km	Destinations	Notes
0.0	0.0	I-15 south (Escondido Freeway) – San Diego	Southbound exit and northbound entrance; southern terminus; no access to I-15 north; I-15 north exit 28; former US 395 south
0.6	0.97	North end of freeway	
0.9	1.4	Citracado Parkway	
1.9	3.1	Felicita Avenue to I-15	
2.5	4.0	Ninth Avenue to I-15	
3.1	5.0	CR S6 east (Second Avenue)	One-way eastbound
3.1	5.0	Grand Avenue – Historic Downtown Escondido	
3.2	5.1	CR S6 west (Valley Parkway) to I-15	One-way westbound
3.6	5.8	Washington Avenue to SR 78 east – Ramona	
3.8	6.1	Mission Avenue	Former US 395 north (1935–1949)
4.0	6.4	SR 78 west (Ronald Packard Parkway) – Oceanside	Interchange; no access to SR 78 east; access to SR 78 east is via Washington Avenue; SR 78 east exit 17C
4.6	7.4	El Norte Parkway to I-15	
6.1	9.8	Country Club Lane	
6.2	10.0	North Centre City Parkway (Frontage Road)	Interchange; northbound exit and southbound entrance; former US 395 north (1949–1969)
6.5	10.5	I-15 north (Escondido Freeway) – Riverside, San Bernardino	Interchange; northern terminus; no access to I-15 south; I-15 south exit 34
1.000 mi = 1.609 km; 1.000 km = 0.621 mi: Incomplete access

=== Lake Elsinore business loop ===
Interstate 15 Business
- Location: Lake Elsinore, CA

Interstate 15 Business in Lake Elsinore, California, provides access to downtown Lake Elsinore as Main Street, Graham Avenue, Lakeshore Drive, and Lake Street. It also follows the former routing of SR 71.

Major intersections
The entire route is in Lake Elsinore, Riverside County.

mi	km	Destinations	Notes
0.0	0.0	Main Street to Camino Del Norte	Continuation beyond I-15
0.0	0.0	I-15 (Temecula Valley Freeway) – Corona, San Diego	Interchange; southern terminus; I-15 exit 75
0.7	1.1	Main Street, Graham Avenue	Main Street is former SR 71 south / US 395 south (1935–1949)
3.3	5.3	SR 74 (Riverside Drive)	
4.8	7.7	Grand Avenue	
6.1	9.8	Nichols Road	
7.3	11.7	Temescal Canyon Road	Former SR 71 north
7.6	12.2	I-15 (Temecula Valley Freeway) – San Diego, Corona	Interchange; northern terminus; I-15 exit 81
7.6	12.2	Lake Street to Walker Canyon Road	Continuation beyond I-15
1.000 mi = 1.609 km; 1.000 km = 0.621 mi

=== Norco business loop ===
Interstate 15 Business
- Location: Norco, CA

Interstate 15 Business in Norco, California, provides access to downtown Norco as Second Street, Hamner Avenue, and Sixth Street. It also follows the former routing of SR 31.

Major intersections
The entire route is in Norco, Riverside County.

mi	km	Destinations	Notes
0.0	0.0	Second Street east	Continuation beyond I-15
0.0	0.0	I-15 – Barstow, San Diego	Interchange; southern terminus; I-15 exit 98
0.2	0.32	Hamner Avenue south, Second Street west	Hamner Avenue is former SR 31 south
2.1	3.4	Hamner Avenue north, Norco Drive	Hamner Avenue is former SR 31 north
2.3	3.7	I-15 – San Diego, Barstow	Interchange; northern terminus; I-15 exit 100
2.3	3.7	Sixth Street	Continuation beyond I-15
1.000 mi = 1.609 km; 1.000 km = 0.621 mi

=== Victorville business loop ===
Interstate 15 Business
- Location: Victorville, CA

Interstate 15 Business in Victorville, California, provides access to downtown Victorville as Seventh Street and D Street. It also follows the former routing of US 66 and US 91.

Major intersections
The entire route is in Victorville, San Bernardino County.

mi	km	Destinations	Notes
0.0	0.0	SR 18 west (Palmdale Road)	Continuation beyond I-15
0.0	0.0	I-15 / SR 18 east (Mojave Freeway) – San Bernardino, Barstow	Interchange; southern terminus; I-15 exit 150; former US 66 west / US 91 south
1.0	1.6	La Paz Drive	
2.8	4.5	SR 18 east (D Street) – Apple Valley	South end of SR 18 overlap
3.6	5.8	I-15 / SR 18 west (Mojave Freeway) – Barstow, San Bernardino	Interchange; northern terminus; north end of SR 18 overlap; I-15 exit 153A
3.6	5.8	D Street – Silver Lakes, Helendale	Continuation beyond I-15; connects to National Trails Highway and CR 66; serves Federal Correctional Complex; former US 66 east / US 91 north
1.000 mi = 1.609 km; 1.000 km = 0.621 mi: Concurrency terminus

=== Barstow business loop ===
Interstate 15 Business
- Location: Barstow, CA

Interstate 15 Business in Barstow, California, provides access to downtown Barstow as L Street and Main Street. It also follows the former routing of US 66.

The northern terminus of I-15 Bus. is Interstate 40 at exit 1, having the distinction of a business loop not ending at its interstate counterpart. The distinction is shared with Interstate 205 Business in the Tracy area in Northern California, where its eastern terminus is with Interstate 5. Unlike I-205 Bus. where it doesn't return to its interstate counterpart, I-15 Bus. does return to I-15, but continues to its northern end at I-40.

Major intersections
The entire route is in Barstow, San Bernardino County.

mi	km	Destinations	Notes
0.0	0.0	L Street	Continuation beyond I-15
0.0	0.0	I-15 (Mojave Freeway) – Las Vegas, San Bernardino	Interchange; southern terminus; I-15 exit 181
0.5	0.80	CR 66 west (West Main Street) – Lenwood	South end of CR 66 overlap; former US 66 west / US 91 south
2.3	3.7	First Avenue	Former US 91 north
2.5	4.0	Barstow Road to I-15 / SR 247	
2.7	4.3	Seventh Avenue	Serves Barstow Community Hospital
4.0	6.4	I-15 (Mojave Freeway) – San Bernardino, Las Vegas	Interchange; I-15 north exit 184B, south exit 184
4.6	7.4	I-40 (Needles Freeway, CR 66 east) – San Bernardino, Needles	Interchange; northern terminus; north end of CR 66 overlap; I-40 exit 1
4.6	7.4	East Main Street, Montara Road	Continuation beyond I-40; East Main Street is former US 66 east
1.000 mi = 1.609 km; 1.000 km = 0.621 mi: Concurrency terminus

=== Baker business loop ===
Interstate 15 Business
- Baker Boulevard
- Location: Baker, CA

Interstate 15 Business in Baker, California, provides access to downtown Baker as Baker Boulevard, serving the many food outlets and fuel stations for drivers on I-15 between Los Angeles and Las Vegas. It also features the World's Tallest Thermometer, a landmark. The business route follows the former routing of US 91 and US 466.

Major intersections
The entire route is in Baker, San Bernardino County.

mi	km	Destinations	Notes
0.0	0.0	I-15 south (Mojave Freeway) – Barstow	Interchange; southern terminus; no access to I-15 north; I-15 north exit 245; former US 91 south / US 466 west
1.4	2.3	SR 127 to I-15	
3.8	6.1	I-15 north (Mojave Freeway) – Las Vegas	Interchange; northern terminus; no access to I-15 south; I-15 south exit 248; former US 91 north / US 466 east
1.000 mi = 1.609 km; 1.000 km = 0.621 mi: Incomplete access

== Nevada ==
=== Mesquite business loop ===
Interstate 15 Business
- Location: Mesquite, NV
- Existed: December 31, 1991–December 31, 2005

Interstate 15 Business in Mesquite, Nevada, was also designated as State Route 144. It was removed as of December 31, 2005. It covered Mesquite Boulevard and Sandhill Boulevard in Mesquite. The State Route designation was applied to the portion of Mesquite Boulevard from its southern crossing of I-15 to Sandhill Boulevard, then along Sandhill Boulevard to its northern crossing of I-15. The route was 3.132 miles (5.040 km) long. Route 144, from SR 170 to Hillside Drive, was once US 91, which used to stretch from Sweetgrass, Montana, to Long Beach, California.

== Utah ==
=== St. George business loop ===
Interstate 15 Business
- Location: St. George, UT

Interstate 15 Business in St. George, Utah, is the first business route along I-15 in the state of Utah. It runs from exit 6 north along Utah State Route 18 (SR-18, Bluff Street) to SR-34 (West St. George Boulevard), where it turns east until reaching exit 8.

=== Cedar City business loop ===
Interstate 15 Business
- Location: Cedar City, UT

Interstate 15 Business in Cedar City, Utah, is the second business route along I-15 in the state of Utah. It runs from exit 57 north along SR-130 (Main Street), where it runs near Southern Utah University and the Paiute Indian Reservation-Cedar City until reaching exit 62.

=== Parowan business loop ===
Interstate 15 Business
- Location: Parowan, UT

Interstate 15 Business (I-15 Bus.) in Parowan, Utah, is the third business route along I-15 in the state of Utah. It runs from exit 75 along SR-143, at first east on 200th Street, then north on South Main Street (Old US Highway 91) until SR-143 turns east onto East Center Street. I-15 Bus. then continues north along SR-274 (North Main Street) eventually serving as the western terminus of SR-271 near Parowan Airport until finally terminating at exit 78.

=== Beaver business loop ===
Interstate 15 Business
- Location: Beaver, UT

Interstate 15 Business in Beaver, Utah, is the fourth business route along I-15 in the state of Utah. It runs from exits 109 to 112 along SR-160.

=== Fillmore business loop ===
Interstate 15 Business
- Location: Fillmore, UT

Interstate 15 Business in Fillmore, Utah, is the fifth business route along I-15 in the state of Utah. It runs from exits 163 to 167 along SR-99.

=== Holden business loop ===
Interstate 15 Business
- Location: Holden, Utah

The former Interstate 15 Business in Holden, Utah, served I-15 in the state of Utah. It ran from exit 174 at SR-64 to US 50 where it terminated at exit 178, the southern terminus of the I-15 / US 50 overlap.

=== Nephi business loop ===
Interstate 15 Business
- Location: Nephi, UT

Interstate 15 Business in the vicinity of Nephi, Utah, is the sixth business route along I-15 in the state of Utah. It runs from exits 222 to 228 along part of SR-28.

=== Payson business loop ===
Interstate 15 Business
- Location: Payson, Utah

=== Layton business loop ===
Interstate 15 Business
- Location: Layton, Utah

The former Interstate 15 Business in Layton, Utah, served I-15 in the state of Utah. It ran from exit 332 at SR-227 then turned onto to SR-106 where it terminated at exit 378, the southern terminus of the I-15 / US 50 overlap.

=== Brigham City business loop ===
Interstate 15 Business
- Location: Brigham City, UT

Interstate 15 Business (I-15 Bus.) is a business loop of I-15 in Brigham City, Utah, and is also concurrent with I-84 Bus. It runs from an interchange at exit 362 on I-15/I-84 at first along US 91 to the intersection with US 89 and SR-13. US 91 continues east along US 89, while I-15 Bus. / I-84 Bus. turn left to go north along SR-13 (South Main Street). Further in town, the road serves as the west end of SR-90. At Forest Street, South Main Street becomes North Main Street. North of there, SR-13 / I-15 Bus. / I-84 Bus. curves to the left onto Promontory Road, while North Main Street's designation is replaced by SR-38. From there, the routes run beneath a bridge for North 500th Street West and then another bridge for a Union Pacific Railroad line, eventually ending at a folded-diamond interchange with I-15/I-84 at exit 365, while SR-13 continues to run northwest through Corinne and points further north.

=== Tremonton business loop ===
Interstate 15 Business
- Location: Box Elder County, UT
- Length: 6.0264 mi (9.6986 km)

Interstate 15 Business (I-15 Bus.) is a 6.0264-mile (9.6986 km) eastern business loop off of I-15 that passes through Elwood and Tremonton, Utah, and runs mostly along State Route 13 (SR-13) and State Route 102 (SR-102). It is the last business route on I-15 in the state and is largely concurrent with I-84 Bus.

I-15 Bus. begins at exit 376 on I-15 / Interstate 84 in Elwood and proceeds north along SR-13 (North 5200 West) to leave Elwood and, about 3,500 feet (1,100 m) later, enter Tremonton. Well beyond (east of) the developed areas of Tremonton, the three routes (I-15 Bus., I-84 Bus., and SR-13) reach an intersection with Utah State Route 102 (SR-102 / West Main Street) at Haws Corner Junction. At that intersection I-15 Bus. and I-84 Bus. both turn west onto SR-102. The three routes (I-15 Bus., I-84 Bus., and SR-02) continue west on West Main Street to connect with the southern end of Utah State Route 82 (North 300 East). Upon crossing Tremonton Street, the three routes transition from West Main Street to East Main Street. At 1000 West (Iowa String Road), I-15 Bus. turns north and leaves its concurrency with I-84 Bus. and SR-102. Proceeding north along North 1000 West (Iowa String Road) I-15 Bus. reaches West 1000 North. Shortly after turning west onto that street, I-15 Bus. reaches its northern terminus at I-15 (exit 378).

== Idaho ==
=== McCammon business loop ===
Interstate 15 Business
- Location: McCammon, ID

Interstate 15 Business (I-15 Bus.) has a length of 4.338 miles (6.981 km) through McCammon, Idaho, in central Bannock County. I-15 Bus. begins at I-15 exit 44 along Jensen Road, then turns north and follows State Street to the city of McCammon. Just north of the city limits, the business route veers onto Center Street and follows that through the center of town. At the north end of the city, I-15 Bus. turns west and runs concurrently with US 30 to its northern end at I-15 exit 47.

=== Inkom business loop ===
Interstate 15 Business
- Location: Inkom, ID

Interstate 15 Business (I-15 Bus.) runs for exactly 1 mile (1.6 km) through Inkom, Idaho, in northern Bannock County. I-15 Bus. mostly follows Old Highway 91 between exits 57 and 58, a pair of partial interchanges.

=== Pocatello business loop ===
Interstate 15 Business
- Location: Pocatello, ID

Interstate 15 Business (I-15 Bus.) spans 5.560 miles (8.948 km) through Pocatello, Idaho, in northern Bannock County. I-15 Bus. begins at I-15 exit 67, where US 30 and US 91 also diverge from I-15. The business route and the U.S. Routes follow Fifth Avenue northwest. The routes split onto a one-way pair of Fifth Avenue northbound and Fourth Avenue southbound. The highways pass by Idaho State University and through downtown Pocatello. At the north end of downtown, I-15 Bus. and the U.S. Routes veer north and converge as Pocatello Avenue. US 30 turns west at Oak Street; the business route and US 91 continue north along Yellowstone Avenue. I-15 Bus. leaves US 91 when it turns east onto Alameda Road, which becomes Pocatello Creek Road when it veers northeast to the business route's terminus at I-15 exit 71.

=== Blackfoot business loop ===
Interstate 15 Business
- Location: Blackfoot, ID

Interstate 15 Business (I-15 Bus.) has a length of 4.802 miles (7.728 km) through Blackfoot, Idaho, in central Bingham County. I-15 Bus. begins at I-15 exit 89 near the northern end of the Fort Hall Indian Reservation and follows US 91 northeast parallel to the Union Pacific Railroad. The highways cross the Blackfoot River into the city of Blackfoot along Broadway Street. In downtown Blackfoot, the routes veer onto Main Street, then I-15 Bus. turns northwest onto a one-way pair, Bridge Street northbound and Judicial Street southbound. The streets converge as Bridge Street, which the business route follows to its end at I-15 exit 93. The roadway continues beyond the interchange as US 26 and immediately crosses the Snake River.

=== Idaho Falls business loop ===
Interstate 15 Business
- Location: Idaho Falls, ID

Interstate 15 Business (I-15 Bus.) runs for 3.409 miles (5.486 km) through Idaho Falls, Idaho, in western Bonneville County. I-15 Bus. begins at I-15 exit 116, which is also where US 26 diverges from the Interstate. The business route and U.S. Route follow Sunnyside Road across the Snake River to Yellowstone Avenue; this intersection forms the northern terminus of US 91. I-15 Bus. and US 26 follow Yellowstone Avenue northeast parallel to the Union Pacific Railroad into downtown Idaho Falls. At the intersection of Yellowstone Avenue and Broadway Street, I-15 Bus. turns northwest onto Broadway Street and runs concurrently with US 20 Bus. across another bridge over the Snake River to their mutual termini at I-15 exit 118. The roadway continues west as US 20.

== Montana ==
=== Dillon business loop ===
Interstate 15 Business
- Location: Dillon, MT

Interstate 15 Business (I-15 Bus.) is a business loop of I-15 in Dillon, Montana. It runs from a diamond interchange at exit 62 along Atlantic Street, Helena Street and Montana Street to a brief overlap with Montana Highway 41 (MT 41) that ends at a trumpet interchange at exit 63.

The I-15 Business Loop begins at exit 62 across from a road leading to the Kiwanis International-established Cornell Park, then, after crossing a bridge over an Oregon Short Line Railroad line, curves north along Atlantic Street, briefly crossing another bridge overnight Blacktail Deer Creek. Between East Chapman and East Poindexter Streets, the route is joined by the former US 91. At Beaver County High School, I-15 Bus. makes a left turn onto Helena Street and, just before crossing the same OSR tracks it ran over earlier, makes a right turn onto Montana Street. Moving away from Downtown Dillon, Former US 91 branches off to the northwest, then across from the intersection with Ramshorn Street, the road turns west onto a wrong way concurrency with MT 41. I-15 Bus. / MT 41 climbs a bridge over former US 91 as well as the OSR line and Blacktail Deer Creek all at once, then makes a southbound curve before finally ending at a trumpet interchange at exit 63.

=== Butte business loop ===
Interstate 15 Business
- Location: Butte, MT

Interstate 15 Business (I-15 Bus.) is a business loop of I-15 in Butte, Montana. It runs from a flyover interchange at exit 124 on I-90 at I-115 to a partial cloverleaf interchange with MT 2 at exit 127. Beside I-115, I-15 Bus. is also concurrent with I-90 Bus.

=== Helena business loop ===
Interstate 15 Business
- Location: Helena, MT

Interstate 15 Business (I-15 Bus.) is a business loop of I-15 in the capital city of Helena, Montana. It runs west from exit 192 along US 12 in Montana at the east end of a one-way pair along Prospect Avenue westbound and 11th Avenue eastbound. At North Montana Avenue, both US 12 and I-15 Bus. turn north, but US 12 curves west onto East Lyndale Avenue between Boulder Avenue and Helena Avenue, and I-15 Bus. follows along this curve, while North Montana Avenue continues north as Lewis and Clark County Road 229. At North Last Chance Gulch, I-15 Bus. turns north-northeast while US 12 continues west along West Lyndale Avenue and I-15 Bus. passes between Centennial Park and Memorial Park, the grounds of the stadium used by the Helena Brewers. After crossing a bridge over a former Northern Pacific Railroad line, I-15 Bus. begins to turn northeast and then, at the intersection of North Montana Avenue, becoming Cedar Street running east, eventually ending at I-15 on exit 193 across from the Helena Regional Airport.

=== Great Falls business loop ===
Interstate 15 Business
- Location: Great Falls, MT
- Existed: 1960s–present

Interstate 15 Business (I-15 Bus.) in Great Falls, Montana, links I-15, which bypasses downtown Great Falls to the west, to the center of Great Falls. As its business loop designation implies, I-15 Bus. terminates at I-15 (concurrent with US 89 and MT 200 through western Great Falls) at each end. The southernmost 0.83 miles (1.34 km) of the route, from the interchange with I-15 to Fox Farm Road, is designated, but not signed, as Interstate 315. It is the second shortest Interstate in the country, the shortest being I-878.

=== Conrad business loop ===
Interstate 15 Business
- Location: Conrad, MT

Interstate 15 Business is a business loop of I-15 in Conrad, Montana. It runs along Old Highway 91 from diamond interchanges at exit 335 and exit 339. The north end was originally a half-diamond/trumpet interchange until it was rebuilt in the 2010s, and was given a rest area / truck weigh station east of the interchange.

=== Shelby business loop ===
Interstate 15 Business
- Location: Shelby, MT

Interstate 15 Business (I-15 Bus.) in Shelby, Montana, links I-15, which bypasses downtown Shelby to the west, to the center of Shelby. The southern terminus of I-15 Bus. is at exit 363 on I-15; from there it follows US 2 into the center of Shelby, then follows Montana Highway 67 (Oilfield Road) across the railyard and through the north end of town to its northern terminus at exit 364 on I-15, just south of Shelby Airport.
