= Montana Highway 69 =

State highway in Montana, United States

Montana Highway 69
- MT 69 highlighted in red

Route information
- Maintained by MDT
- Length: 38.395 mi (61.791 km)

Major junctions
- South end: MT 55 at Whitehall
- North end: I-15 at Boulder

Location
- Country: United States
- State: Montana
- Counties: Jefferson

Highway system
- Montana Highway System; Interstate; US; State; Secondary
← MT 68	→ MT 72

Montana Highway 69 (MT 69) is a route running northerly from an intersection with MT 55 in the community of Whitehall. The highway extends approximately 38 miles (61 km) to an intersection with Interstate 15 (I-15) at the northern edge of the town of Boulder. Most of the route follows the Boulder River valley, a scenic and relatively unspoiled rural landscape.

== Route description ==
MT 69 begins at MT 55 at Whitehall. Concurrent with MT 2, it runs parallel to I-90, before intersecting it, and proceeding northward. An intersection with Boulder Cutoff Road is not far off. It reaches an intersection with Wilson Park Road before continuing northward, and intersecting Dunn Canyon Road. Dunn lane intersects from the east, and shortly after, MT 69 intersects with Lower Valley Road. Thereafter, it intersects Quintana Lane before intersecting several minor roads. Through a scenic and rural area, MT 69 proceeds north as South Main Street as it enters Boulder. MT 69 ends at I-15, at Boulder.

== History ==
The southerly six miles of the current MT 69 follows a former alignment of U.S. Route 10 and parallels Interstate 90; the U.S. 10 designation was deleted in Montana after the completion of the interstate. The remainder of MT 69 was formerly designated as Secondary Highway 281.

== Major intersections ==
The entire route is in Jefferson County.

Location	mi	km	Destinations	Notes
Whitehall	0.000	0.000	MT 2 west / MT 55	Southern end of MT 2 overlap
	6.100	9.817	MT 2 ends / S-359 east	Northern end of MT 2 overlap
Boulder	36.926	59.427	S-399 south	
Boulder	38.395	61.791	I-15 – Helena, Butte	
1.000 mi = 1.609 km; 1.000 km = 0.621 mi: Concurrency terminus
