= Kidd, Montana =

Populated place in Beaverhead County, Montana, United States

Coordinates: 44.79806°N 112.75069°W

Kidd, Montana is in Beaverhead County, Montana, between Dell and Redrock, along Interstate 15 going north towards Dillon, Montana, 59725.
