= Boulder Batholith =

Geologic formation in southwestern Montana, United States

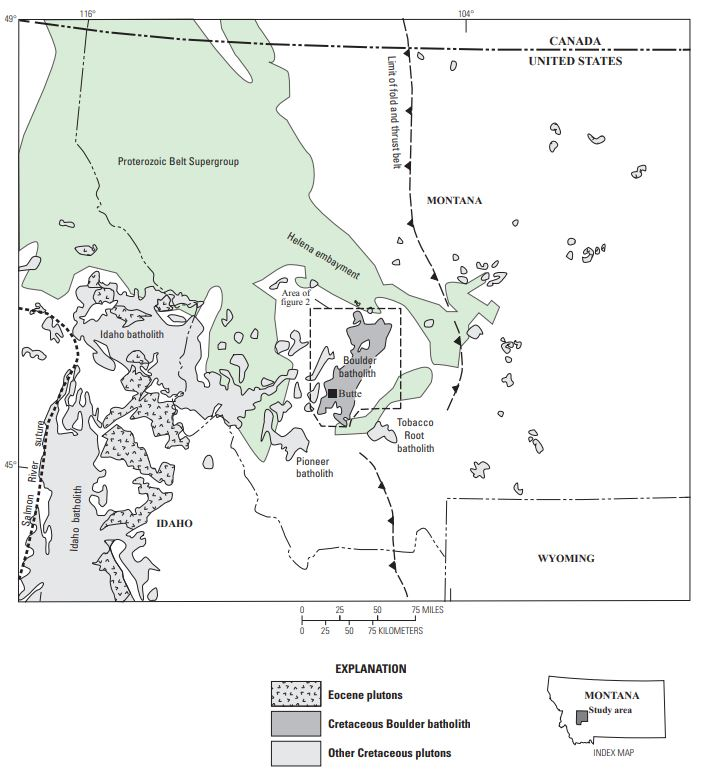
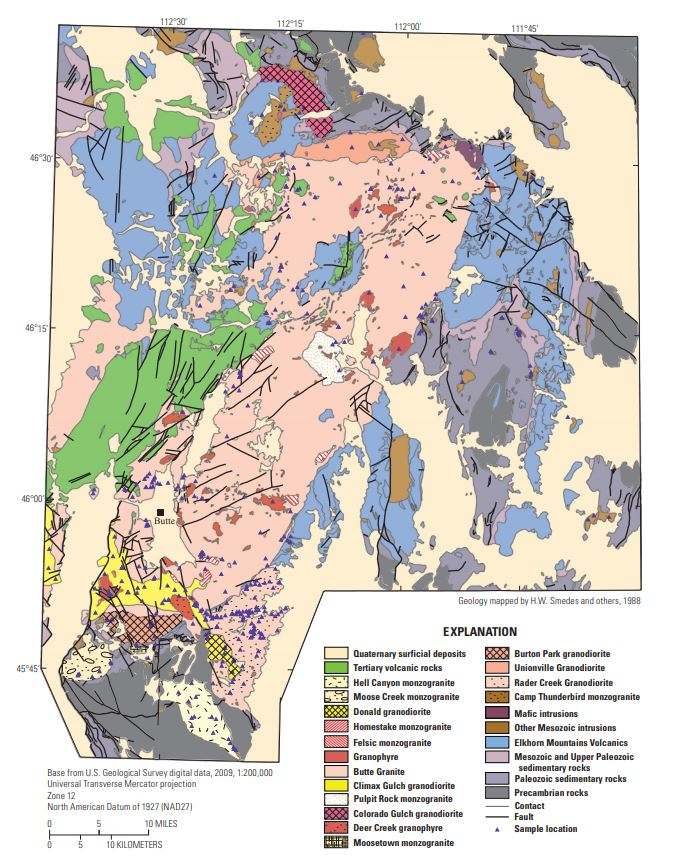
(Left) Location of the Boulder Batholith in relation to the Idaho Batholith. (right) Geological map of the Boulder Batholith

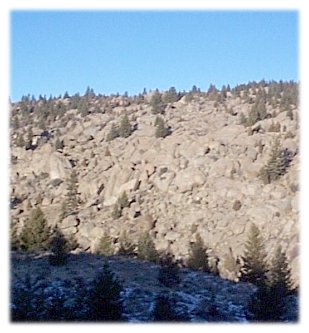
Rounded brown-weathering boulders give the Boulder Batholith its name.

The Boulder Batholith is a relatively small batholith in southwestern Montana, United States, exposed at the surface as granite (more specifically quartz monzonite) and serving as the host rock for rich mineralized deposits at Butte and other locations. The batholith lies roughly between Butte and Helena, and between the Deer Lodge (Upper Clark Fork) Valley and the Broadwater (Upper Missouri) Valley. The volcanic Elkhorn Mountains are a large mass of forested lava associated with the batholith.

The batholith is composed of at least seven, and possibly as many as 14, discrete rock masses called plutons, which had formed beneath the Earth's surface during a period of magma intrusion about 73 to 78 million years ago (Late Cretaceous time). The rising buoyant plutons resulted from subduction along what was then the west coast of North America, which was near today's border between Montana and Idaho. Regional uplift brought the deep-seated granite to the surface, where erosion exposed the rocks and the extremely rich mineral veins they contained. Hundreds of millions of dollars of copper, silver, gold, zinc, lead, and other metals have been mined from the batholith, both using underground mining and pit mining.

The Butte Granite makes up the bulk of the batholith (about 70%), with additional named intrusions along the periphery consisting of granodiorite, monzogranite, and minor syenogranite. The batholith intruded into Mesoproterozoic and Mesozoic sedimentary rocks, including the Elkhorn Mountains volcanics. The origin of these igneous rocks is related to subduction and continental magmatic arc processes associated with the Late Cretaceous western margin of North America. Later hydrothermal vein activity along fault and shear zones within the Butte quartz monzonite and its contact with adjacent rocks, resulted in major ore deposits of lead, zinc, and silver.

The Boulder Batholith was named for the prominent rounded boulders that typify its landscape, the result of spheroidal weathering of fractured granite. It measures approximately 75 miles (121 km) north-south by about 25 miles (40 km) east-west, rather small in comparison to most batholiths.
