= Interstate 115 =

Highway in Montana

Interstate 115
- I-115 highlighted in red

Route information
- Auxiliary route of I-15
- Maintained by MDT
- Length: 1.194 mi (1.922 km)
- Existed: 1971–present
- NHS: Entire route

Major junctions
- South end: I-15 / I-90 in Butte
- North end: I-15 BL / I-90 BL in Butte

Location
- Country: United States
- State: Montana
- Counties: Silver Bow

Highway system
- Interstate Highway System; Main; Auxiliary; Suffixed; Business; Future; Montana Highway System; Interstate; US; State; Secondary
← I-94	→ MT 117

Interstate 115 (I-115) is a 1.194-mile-long (1.922 km) short-spurred auxiliary Interstate Highway which connects I-15/I-90 to Butte in the U.S. state of Montana. The highway is concurrent with I-15 Bus./I-90 Bus. for its entire length and is signed north-south although it travels east-west. The highway travels from an incomplete interchange with I-15/I-90 through generally rural areas in western Butte. It also has an interchange with Excelsior Avenue before terminating. The entire route was built to Interstate standards during the 1960s and was further changed in 2005.

== Route description ==
I-115 begins at an interchange with I-15/I-90. As a four-lane highway with two lanes in each direction, I-115 heads east into downtown Butte. Before reaching exit 1, eastbound traffic makes a curve while westbound traffic goes to I-15/I-90 without making such a curve, therefore, that portion of I-115 contains a large median. The other portion at exit 1, however, is separated only by a curbed street median and does not have a Jersey barrier separating the two halves. Approximately one mile (1.6 km) from I-15/I-90, I-115 has its only interchange at Excelsior Avenue, which can be used to access the town of Walkerville. Excelsior Avenue is the only numbered exit along I-115, and the structure of the interchange directs motorists to stop and yield signs, as opposed to traffic signals for most exits in urban areas. I-115 ends at the overpass over Excelsior Avenue. It continues into Butte as I-15 Bus./I-90 Bus.

== History ==
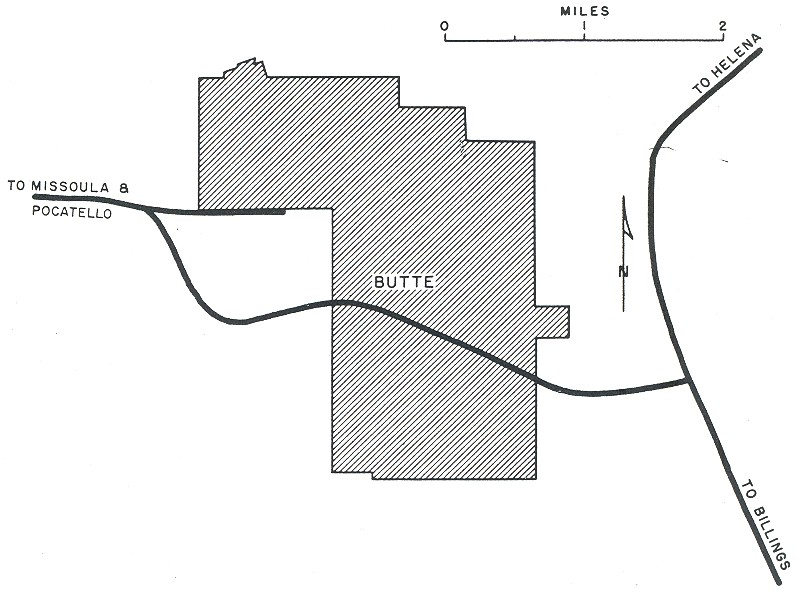
Planning map for the Butte area freeways from 1955

The development of a freeway along the modern-day I-115 corridor was proposed in the 1950s. The 1955 General Location of National System of Interstate Highways, an early platform for what would become the Interstate Highway System, contained an inset of the proposed freeways in and around the city of Butte including an east–west freeway spur on the west side of the community. Designated as part of the Interstate Highway System around 1957, I-115's construction was funded by the federal government. (Note: I-115 was constructed and included in the Interstate Highway System before 1978. The Surface Transportation Assistance Act of 1978 provided that all Interstate construction authorized under previous amendments to the system would be funded by the federal government but additional highway mileage added under 23 U.S.C. § 103(c)(4)(A) would not be supported by the same allocation of funds.)

== Exit list ==
The entire route is in Butte, Silver Bow County.

mi	km	Exit	Destinations	Notes
0.000	0.000		I-15 south / I-90 west / I-15 BL begins / I-90 BL begins – Billings, Helena, Idaho Falls, Missoula	Exit 124 on I-15/I-90; no access to I-15 north/I-90 east
1.194	1.922	1	Excelsior Avenue – Walkerville	
1.194	1.922		I-15 BL north / I-90 BL east (Iron Street)	Continuation beyond Excelsior Avenue
1.000 mi = 1.609 km; 1.000 km = 0.621 mi: Incomplete access
