= Interstate 15 in Montana =

Section of Interstate Highway in Montana, United States

Interstate 15
- First Special Service Force Memorial Highway
- I-15 highlighted in red

Route information
- Maintained by MDT
- Length: 396.030 mi (637.349 km)
- NHS: Entire route

Major junctions
- South end: I-15 at the Idaho state line in Monida
- I-90 in Butte; I-115 in Butte; US 287 in Helena; I-315 / US 89 / MT 200 in Great Falls; US 2 in Shelby
- North end: Highway 4 at the Canadian border near Sweetgrass

Location
- Country: United States
- State: Montana
- Counties: Beaverhead, Madison, Silver Bow, Jefferson, Lewis and Clark, Cascade, Teton, Pondera, Toole

Highway system
- Interstate Highway System; Main; Auxiliary; Suffixed; Business; Future; Montana Highway System; Interstate; US; State; Secondary
← MT 13	→ MT 16

In the U.S. state of Montana, Interstate 15 (I-15) continues onward from Idaho for nearly 400 miles (640 km) through the cities of Butte, Helena, and Great Falls, intersecting with I-90, I-115, and I-315. I-15 reaches its northern terminus at the international border with Alberta, Canada. I-15 is additionally named as the First Special Service Force Memorial Highway from Helena to the Alberta border, where Alberta Highway 4 continues into Canada retaining that designation.

I-15 joins with I-90 and makes a junction with a short, one-mile (1.6 km) spur route I-115 in Butte.

== Route description ==
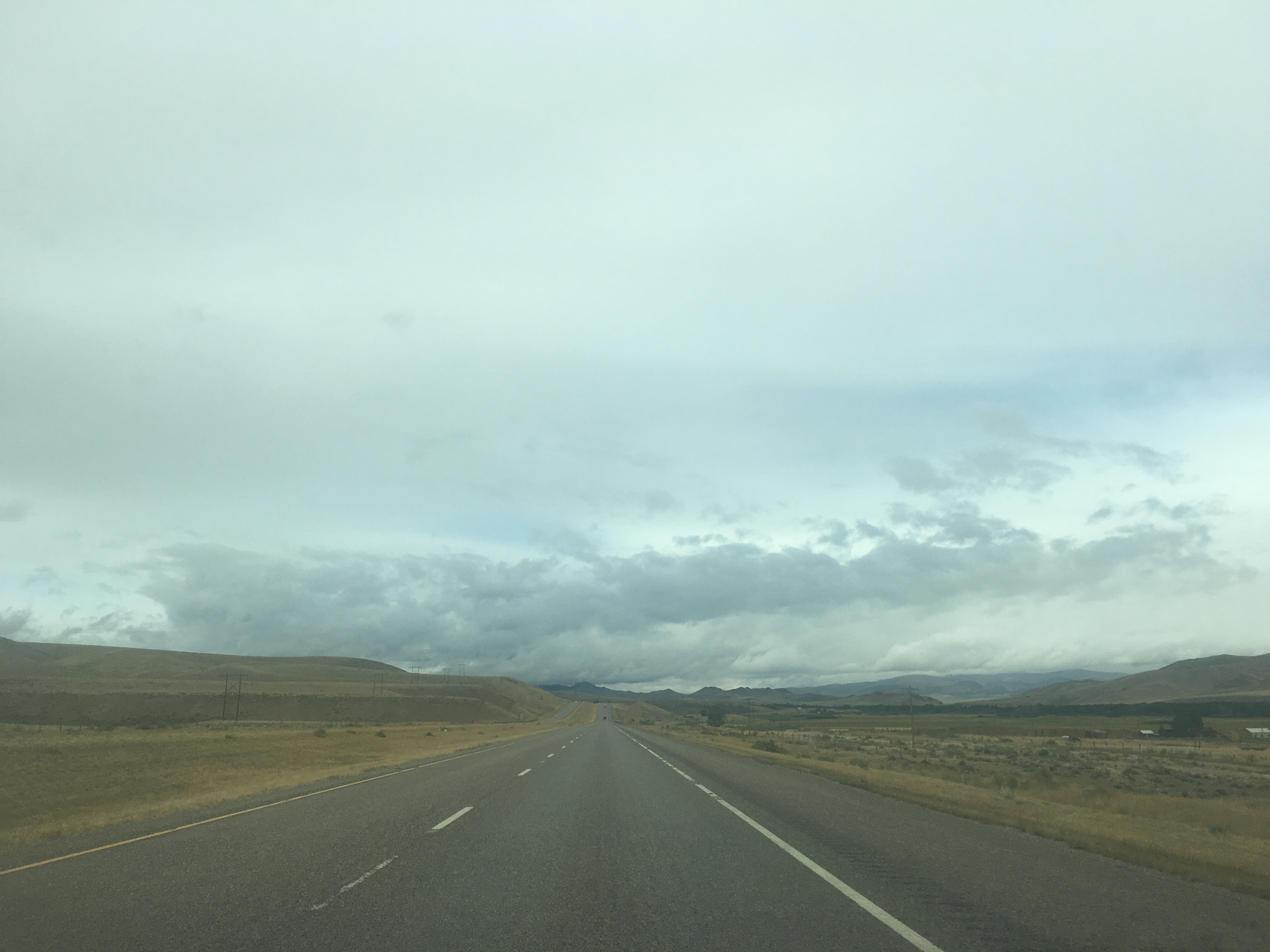
I-15, 20 miles (32 km) south of Dillon, Montana

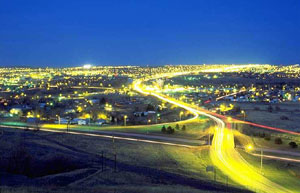
I-15 (foreground left to right) goes through the city of Great Falls, MT

I-15 crosses into Montana from Idaho just south of Lima Reservoir over Monida Pass, at 6,870 feet (2,090 m), the highest elevation on the entire route of I-15. The route continues northwest through farmland and desert. The freeway turns north at Clark Canyon Reservoir, before turning northeast. In the town of Dillon, I-15 passes near Clark's Lookout State Park before beginning to parallel the Big Hole River. The freeway then turns away from the river, continuing northeast along Divide Creek through the desert, before splitting away from the creek and heading north. I-15 eventually merges into I-90 at a trumpet interchange.

I-15 and I-90 run concurrently through the city of Butte, coming first to an interchange with I-115, signed as Business Loop 15 and Business Loop 90. I-15 and I-90 pass through a green area in the middle of the city, before I-15 splits off to the northeast on the eastern end of the town. The freeway climbs along the eastern edge of the Continental Pit mine, and then over continental divide at Elk Park Pass. I-15 travels through the forest and plains of Elk Park before winding along Bison Creek and later the Boulder River. I-15 passes through the town of Basin before leaving the mountains and providing access to Boulder. Paralleling Beavertown Creek, the road winds through the hills before passing through Jefferson City. The freeway continues into Helena, where I-15 intersects US 12 and runs concurrently with US 287 through the outskirts of the city before continuing north through the plains.

I-15 and US 287 continue along Little Prickly Pear Creek before passing through the town of Wolf Creek after several miles. Northeast of there, US 287 continues north, while I-15 runs close to the Missouri River. The freeway provides access to Cascade and then continues through the plains through Ulm before turning northeast into the city of Great Falls. I-315 and US 89 intersect with I-15 at a trumpet interchange, and US 89 continues north and then northwest along I-15 for a few miles before continuing to the west. I-15 continues northwest through farmland before passing near Dutton and Brady, and the city of Conrad. US 2 intersects I-15 in the town of Shelby. The freeway passes through the town of Sunburst, then passes through a final stretch of farmland. Eventually, I-15 passes through the last town before Canada, Sweet Grass, and then crosses the international border, becoming Alberta Highway 4.

== History ==
In 1996, I-15 between Helena and Sweet Grass was renamed the "First Special Service Force Memorial Highway". It was chosen because it was the route taken in 1942 by the Canadian volunteers to join their American counterparts for training at Fort Harrison.

== Exit list ==
County	Location	mi	km	Exit	Destinations	Notes
Monida Pass		0.000	0.000		I-15 south – Idaho Falls	Continuation into Idaho
Monida Pass		0.509	0.819	0	S-509 – Monida	
Beaverhead		9.544	15.360	9	Snowline (ranch access)	
Beaverhead	Lima	15.185	24.438	15	Lima	
Beaverhead	Dell	23.832	38.354	23	Dell	
Beaverhead		29.609	47.651	29	Kidd	
Beaverhead		37.353	60.114	37	Red Rock	
Beaverhead		44.454	71.542	44	S-324 west – Clark Canyon Reservoir	
Beaverhead		51.199	82.397	51	Dalys	Southbound exit and northbound entrance only
Beaverhead		52.613	84.672	52	Grasshopper Creek	
Beaverhead		56.028	90.168	56	Barretts	
Beaverhead		59.702	96.081	59	S-278 west / S-222 – Jackson, Wisdom	
Beaverhead	Dillon	62.440	100.487	62	I-15 BL north – Dillon, Twin Bridges	
Beaverhead	Dillon	63.813	102.697	63	I-15 BL south / MT 41 – Dillon	
Beaverhead	Apex	75.046	120.775	74	Apex, Birch Creek	
Beaverhead		85.272	137.232	85	Glen	
Madison	Melrose	93.188	149.972	93	Melrose	
Silver Bow	Butte	99.266	159.753	99	Moose Creek Road	
Silver Bow	Butte	102.515	164.982	102	MT 43 west – Divide, Wisdom	
Silver Bow	Butte	111.271	179.073	111	Feely	
Silver Bow	Butte	116.361	187.265	116	Buxton	
Silver Bow	Butte	119.970	193.073	119	Hub Access – Silver Bow	
Silver Bow	Butte	121.462	195.474	121	I-90 west – Missoula	South end of I-90 overlap; I-90 east exit 219; left exits; left entrance northbound
Silver Bow	Butte	122.491	197.130	122	Rocker	
Silver Bow	Butte	124.319	200.072	124	I-115 east / I-15 BL north / I-90 BL east – City Center	Northbound exit and southbound entrance
Silver Bow	Butte	126.343	203.329	126	Montana Street	
Silver Bow	Butte	127.961	205.933	127	I-15 BL south / I-90 BL west (Harrison Avenue) / MT 2 east	Signed as exits 127A and 127B northbound; I-15 Bus./I-90 Bus. not signed northbound
Silver Bow	Butte	129.498	208.407	129	I-90 east – Billings	North end of I-90 overlap; I-90 west exit 227; left exits; left entrance southbound
Jefferson		134.061	215.750	134	Woodville	
Jefferson		138.698	223.213	138	Elk Park	
Jefferson		151.226	243.375	151	Bernice	
Jefferson	Basin	156.391	251.687	156	Basin	
Jefferson		159.831	257.223	160	High Ore Road	
Jefferson	Boulder	164.406	264.586	164	MT 69 south – Boulder	
Jefferson	Jefferson City	175.576	282.562	176	Jefferson City (S-282)	
Jefferson	Clancy	181.575	292.217	182	Clancy (S-282)	
Jefferson	Montana City	187.161	301.206	187	S-518 to S-282 – Montana City	
Lewis and Clark	Helena	189.986	305.753	190	South Helena, Nob Hill area	
Lewis and Clark	Helena	191.602	308.354	192	I-15 BL north / US 12 / US 287 south – Townsend, Capitol Area	South end of US 287 overlap
Lewis and Clark	Helena	192.772	310.236	193	I-15 BL south (Cedar Street)	
Lewis and Clark	Helena	193.468	311.357	194	Custer Avenue	
Lewis and Clark	Helena	199.535	321.120	200	S-279 / S-453 (Lincoln Road)	
Lewis and Clark		208.573	335.666	209	Gates of the Mountains	
Lewis and Clark		215.440	346.717	216	Sieben	
Lewis and Clark		218.667	351.910	219	Spring Creek	Northbound exit and southbound entrance
Lewis and Clark	Wolf Creek	226.223	364.071	226	S-434 – Wolf Creek	
Lewis and Clark		228.022	366.966	228	US 287 north – Augusta, Choteau	North end of US 287 overlap
Lewis and Clark	Craig	233.698	376.100	234	Craig	
Cascade	Mid Canon	239.817	385.948	240	Dearborn	
Cascade		243.533	391.928	244	Canyon Access	
Cascade		246.807	397.197	247	Hardy Creek	
Cascade		249.531	401.581	250	Local Access	
Cascade	Cascade	254.042	408.841	254	MT 68 north – Cascade	
Cascade	Cascade	255.555	411.276	256	MT 68 south – Cascade	
Cascade	Ulm	269.495	433.710	270	S-330 – Ulm	
Cascade	Great Falls	276.889	445.610	277	Great Falls International Airport	
Cascade	Great Falls	278.063	447.499	278	I-15 BL north / US 89 south / MT 200 east / I-315 east / MT 3 south (10th Avenue South)	South end of US 89 / MT 200 overlap
Cascade	Great Falls	279.652	450.056	280	I-15 BL south to US 87 north (Central Avenue West)	
Cascade	Great Falls	281.631	453.241	282	Northwest Bypass to US 87 north	Southbound exit and northbound entrance
Cascade		285.509	459.482	286	Manchester	
Cascade	Vaughn	289.607	466.077	290	US 89 north / MT 200 west – Missoula, Choteau	North end of US 89 / MT 200 overlap
Cascade		296.752	477.576	297	Gordon	
Teton		301.528	485.262	302	S-431 – Power	
Teton	Dutton	311.672	501.587	313	S-221 / S-379 – Dutton, Choteau	
Teton		319.467	514.132	321	Collins Road	
Pondera	Brady	326.128	524.852	328	S-365 – Brady	
Pondera		333.507	536.727	335	I-15 BL north (Midway Road) – Conrad	
Pondera	Conrad	337.358	542.925	339	I-15 BL south – Conrad	
Pondera		343.245	552.399	345	S-366 (Ledger Road) – Tiber Dam	
Pondera		346.250	557.235	348	MT 44 (Valier Road)	
Pondera		350.259	563.687	352	Bullhead Road	
Toole		356.788	574.195	358	Golf Course Road, Marias Valley Road	
Toole	Shelby	361.350	581.536	363	I-15 BL north / US 2 – Shelby, Cut Bank	
Toole	Shelby	362.601	583.550	364	I-15 BL south – Shelby	
Toole		367.118	590.819	369	Bronken Road	
Toole		371.114	597.250	373	Potter Road	
Toole		377.123	606.921	379	S-215 / S-343 – Kevin, Oilmont	
Toole		383.128	616.585	385	Swayze Road	
Toole	Sunburst	387.677	623.906	389	S-552 – Sunburst	
Toole		391.930	630.750	394	Ranch Access	
Toole	Sweet Grass	395.770	636.930	397	Sweetgrass (S-214)	
Toole	Sweet Grass	396.030	637.349	Sweetgrass–Coutts Border Crossing; Canada–United States border		
Toole	Sweet Grass	396.030	637.349		Highway 4 north – Lethbridge	Continuation into Alberta
1.000 mi = 1.609 km; 1.000 km = 0.621 mi: Concurrency terminus; Incomplete access; Route transition

Interstate 15
Previous state: Idaho	Montana	Next state: Terminus
