= List of Interstate Highways in Montana =

Interstate Highways of the Montana Highway System
- Typical Interstate highway markers used for Interstate 90, Interstate 115, and Business loop 94 in Montana
- Interstate Highways highlighted in red

System information
- Maintained by MDT

Highway names
- Interstates: Interstate n (I-n)
- US Highways: U.S. Highway n (US n)
- State: Montana Highway n (MT n)
- Secondary: Secondary Highway n (S-n)

System links
- Montana Highway System; Interstate; US; State; Secondary

The Interstate Highways in Montana are the segments of the Dwight D. Eisenhower National System of Interstate and Defense Highways owned and maintained by the Montana Department of Transportation (MDT) in the U.S. state of Montana.

The state's Interstate highways, totaling 1,198 miles (1,928 km), were built between 1956 and 1988 at a cost of $1.22 billion. 95 percent of the system serves rural areas, the highest proportion of any state under Interstate program. The entire Interstate system in Montana was designated as the Purple Heart Trail in 2003.

== Mainline highways ==
Number	Length (mi)	Length (km)	Southern or western terminus	Northern or eastern terminus	Formed	Removed
I-15	396.03	637.35	I-15 near Monida	Hwy 4 at Sweetgrass	—	—
I-90	551.68	887.84	I-90 near Mullan, ID	I-90 / US 87 near Ranchester, WY	—	—
I-94	249.15	400.97	I-90 at Billings	I-94 near Beach, ND	—	—
I-115	1.19	1.92	I-15 / I-90 in Butte	Downtown Butte	—	—
I-315	0.83	1.34	I-15 / US 89 / MT 200 in Great Falls	Downtown Great Falls	—	—

== Business routes ==
Number	Length (mi)	Length (km)	Southern or western terminus	Northern or eastern terminus	Formed	Removed	Notes
I-15 BL	—	—	—	—	—	—	Serves Dillon
I-15 BL	—	—	—	—	—	—	Serves Butte
I-15 BL	—	—	—	—	—	—	Serves Helena
I-15 BL	—	—	—	—	—	—	Serves Great Falls
I-15 BL	—	—	—	—	—	—	Serves Shelby
I-90 BL	—	—	—	—	—	—	Serves Alberton
I-90 BL	—	—	—	—	—	—	Serves Missoula
I-90 BL	—	—	—	—	—	—	Serves Deer Lodge
I-90 BL	—	—	—	—	—	—	Serves Butte
I-90 BL	—	—	—	—	—	—	Serves Bozeman
I-90 BL	—	—	—	—	—	—	Serves Livingston
I-90 BL	—	—	—	—	—	—	Serves Big Timber
I-90 BL	—	—	—	—	—	—	Serves Laurel
I-90 BL	—	—	—	—	—	—	Serves Billings
I-90 BL	—	—	—	—	—	—	Serves Hardin
I-94 BL	—	—	—	—	—	—	Serves Miles City
I-94 BL	—	—	—	—	—	—	Serves Glendive
