= Boulder, Montana =

- Town
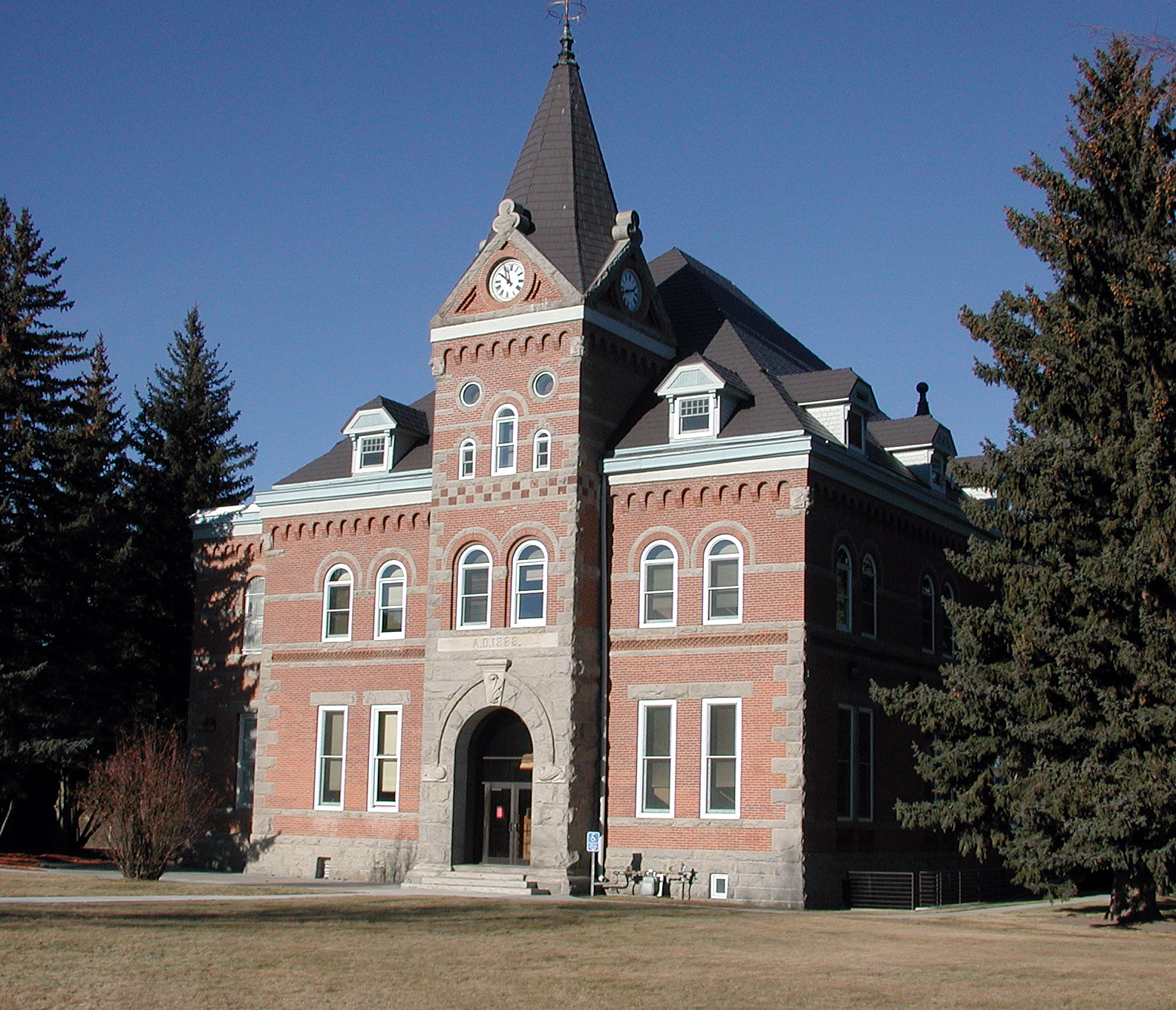
- Jefferson County Courthouse in Boulder

- icon

- Location of Boulder, Montana

- Location of Boulder in Montana
- Coordinates: 46°14′09″N 112°07′24″W
- Country: United States
- State: Montana
- County: Jefferson

Government
  - City Administrator: Brian Bullock

Area
  - Town: 1.12 sq mi (2.91 km^{2})
  - Land: 1.12 sq mi (2.91 km^{2})
  - Water: 0 sq mi (0.00 km^{2})
- Elevation: 4,905 ft (1,495 m)

Population (2020)
  - Town: 1,201
  - Density: 1,068.3/sq mi (412.47/km^{2})
  - Metro: 83,058
- Time zone: UTC-7 (MST)
  - Summer (DST): UTC-6 (MDT)
- Zipcode: 59632
- Area code: 406
- FIPS code: 30-08575
- GNIS feature ID: 2411712
- Website: www.cityofbouldermt.com

Boulder is a town in and the county seat of Jefferson County, Montana, United States. It is on the north bank of the Boulder River between Butte and Helena, slightly east of the Continental Divide, at the intersection of Interstate 15 and Montana Highway 69. The population was 1,201 at the 2020 census. It is part of the Helena Micropolitan Statistical Area, which includes all of Lewis and Clark and Jefferson counties; its population is 83,058 according to the 2020 Census.

Established in the 19th century as a stagecoach station, Boulder grew into a regional trading center for farmers, ranchers, and miners and, by the end of that century, home to state schools for the deaf, blind and developmentally disabled. In the 21st century, it is the center of government in Jefferson County, and institutions based in the town offer services for disabled adults and troubled youths. Its library system serves about 10,000 people, and its high school district covers more than 1,000 square miles (2,600 km^{2}). Three buildings in Boulder are listed on the National Register of Historic Places.

== History ==
Named for the many large boulders in the vicinity, the town of Boulder Valley was established in the early 1860s as a stagecoach station on the route between Fort Benton and Virginia City. It later became a trading center for nearby agricultural areas and the Elkhorn, Comet, and Baltimore mining districts. The Great Northern Railway branch line from Helena to Butte reached Boulder in 1888. State schools for the deaf, blind, and developmentally disabled were established in the city in 1892. In 1897, the town's name was shortened to Boulder.

In the 1892 Montana capital referendum's first round, Boulder was a candidate city to become the newly-admitted Montana's capital. It faced Helena, Anaconda, Butte, Bozeman, Great Falls, and Deer Lodge. As Boulder finished last with only 295 votes, it was not in the second round in 1894, which Helena won.

== Geography and geology ==
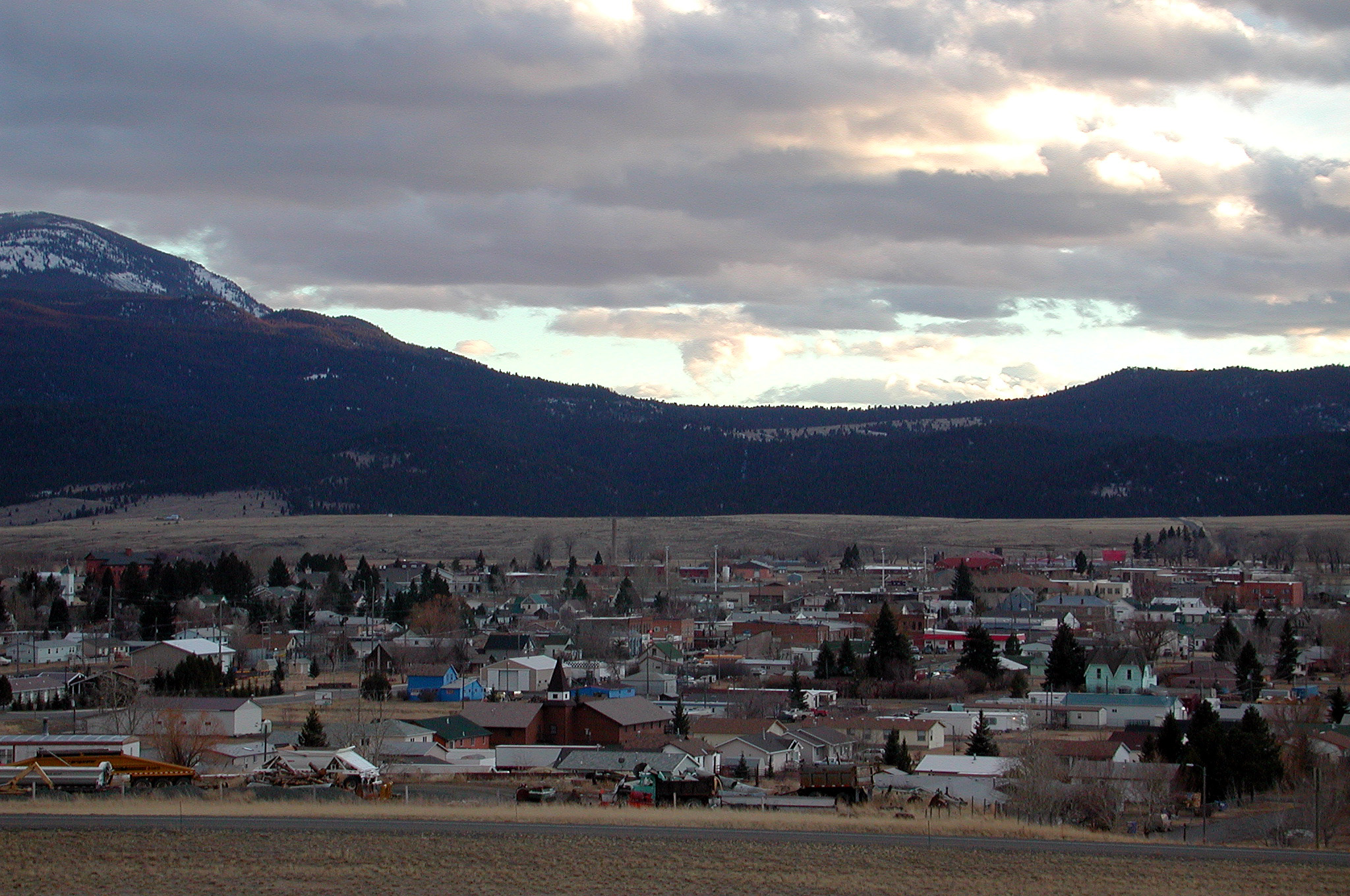
Boulder as seen from near Interstate 15

Boulder lies at an elevation of 4,990 feet (1,521 m) above sea level along Interstate 15 at its intersection with Montana Highway 69, approximately 35 miles (56 km) north of Butte, and 27 miles (43 km) south of Helena. The town is on the north bank of the Boulder River, a tributary of the Jefferson River. According to the United States Census Bureau, the city has a total area of 1.12 square miles (2.90 km^{2}), all land.

In the late Cretaceous Period (roughly 81 to 74 million years ago), molten rock (magma) rose to the Earth's surface in and near what later became Jefferson County and eventually formed an intrusive body of granitic rock up to 10 miles (16 km) thick and 100 miles (161 km) in diameter. This body, known as the Boulder Batholith, extends from Helena to Butte, and is the host rock for the many valuable ores mined in the region. As the granite cooled, it cracked, and hot solutions filled the cracks and formed mineral veins bearing gold and other metals. Millions of years later, weathering allowed gold in the veins to wash down to the gravels in the Boulder River valley. The Boulder mining district was essentially limited to placer mining of those gravels, because the source lodes were in other mining districts in the mountains.

== Demographics ==
Historical population
Census	Pop.	Note	%±
1880	214		—
1920	682		—
1930	926		35.8%
1940	510		−44.9%
1950	1,017		99.4%
1960	1,394		37.1%
1970	1,342		−3.7%
1980	1,441		7.4%
1990	1,316		−8.7%
2000	1,300		−1.2%
2010	1,183		−9.0%
2020	1,201		1.5%
U.S. Decennial Census

=== 2010 census ===
As of the census of 2010, there were 1,183 people, 514 households, and 298 families residing in the city. The population density was 1,046.9 inhabitants per square mile (404.2/km^{2}). There were 565 housing units at an average density of 500.0 per square mile (193.1/km^{2}). The racial makeup of the city was 93.6% White, 1.8% Native American, 0.4% Asian, 0.3% from other races, and 3.9% from two or more races. Hispanic or Latino of any race were 2.9% of the population.

There were 514 households, of which 23.2% had children under the age of 18 living with them, 42.8% were married couples living together, 9.1% had a female householder with no husband present, 6.0% had a male householder with no wife present, and 42.0% were non-families. 37.9% of all households were made up of individuals, and 11.5% had someone living alone who was 65 years of age or older. The average household size was 2.15 and the average family size was 2.79.

The median age in the city was 43.7 years. 18.9% of residents were under the age of 18; 9.3% were between the ages of 18 and 24; 23.5% were from 25 to 44; 34.8% were from 45 to 64; and 13.6% were 65 years of age or older. The gender makeup of the city was 52.4% male and 47.6% female.

=== 2000 census ===
As of the census of 2000, there were 1,300 people, 508 households, and 316 families residing in the town. The population density was 1,142.7 inhabitants per square mile (441.2/km^{2}). There were 568 housing units at an average density of 499.3 per square mile (192.8/km^{2}). The racial makeup of the town was 94.23% White, 0.23% African American, 2.31% Native American, 0.69% Asian, 0.08% Pacific Islander, 0.31% from other races, and 2.15% from two or more races. Hispanic or Latino of any race were 1.15% of the population.

There were 508 households, out of which 32.7% had children under the age of 18 living with them, 48.6% were married couples living together, 10.4% had a female householder with no husband present, and 37.6% were non-families. 34.8% of all households were made up of individuals, and 12.8% had someone living alone who was 65 years of age or older. The average household size was 2.34 and the average family size was 3.04.

In the town, the population was spread out, with 25.7% under the age of 18, 7.3% from 18 to 24, 30.8% from 25 to 44, 25.7% from 45 to 64, and 10.5% who were 65 years of age or older. The median age was 38 years. For every 100 females there were 103.1 males. For every 100 females age 18 and over, there were 102.5 males.

The median income for a household in the town was $29,276, and the median income for a family was $37,411. Males had a median income of $26,985 versus $22,500 for females. The per capita income for the town was $14,657. About 10.7% of families and 15.6% of the population were below the poverty line, including 19.7% of those under age 18 and 13.3% of those age 65 or over.

== Economy ==
About 300 people are employed in Boulder at the Montana Developmental Center, a state institution for people with developmental disabilities. Another 100 or so people work for Alternative Youth Adventures (Youth Dynamics, Inc.), which provides residential services for troubled youth. In addition, Riverside Corrections, a state-run detention center for juvenile females, employs about 30 people.

Boulder and vicinity are home to commercial "health mines" for which it is claimed by testimonial that exposure to radon gas mitigates auto-immune diseases such as arthritis. Though contributing to the economy of the area by attracting tourists, the practice is controversial because of the "well-documented ill effects of high-dose radiation on the body."

== Arts and culture ==
Boulder Community Library is the center of a library system serving about 10,000 people in Jefferson County, Montana. In 2005, it had about 39,000 books and serial volumes in its collection, 85 subscriptions, 3,200 videos, 1,500 audio materials, and 21 Internet terminals.

Boulder has three buildings on the National Register of Historic Places. The Jefferson County Courthouse, on Centennial Avenue, was added in 1980. The Montana Deaf and Dumb Asylum, also known as the Old Administration Building, off Montana Highway 69 (formerly Montana Secondary Highway 281) near Boulder, was added in 1985. The Boulder Hot Springs Hotel, southeast of Boulder on Montana Highway 69, was added in 1979.

Boulder's Elkhorn Treatment Center, which operates under the Montana Department of Corrections, is known for its work with women battling methamphetamine addiction.

== Climate ==
The average temperature in January is 20 °F (−7 °C), and in July it is 64 °F (18 °C). Annual snowfall averages 33 inches (84 cm).

Climate data for Boulder, Montana (1991–2020 normals, extremes 1948–present)
Month	Jan	Feb	Mar	Apr	May	Jun	Jul	Aug	Sep	Oct	Nov	Dec	Year
Record high °F (°C)	59 (15)	65 (18)	72 (22)	83 (28)	89 (32)	96 (36)	101 (38)	100 (38)	96 (36)	87 (31)	71 (22)	65 (18)	101 (38)
Mean maximum °F (°C)	51.8 (11.0)	53.9 (12.2)	63.1 (17.3)	71.4 (21.9)	79.5 (26.4)	87.1 (30.6)	93.1 (33.9)	91.6 (33.1)	86.8 (30.4)	76.4 (24.7)	60.4 (15.8)	50.1 (10.1)	93.9 (34.4)
Mean daily maximum °F (°C)	35.0 (1.7)	37.8 (3.2)	46.8 (8.2)	54.5 (12.5)	63.6 (17.6)	72.0 (22.2)	82.5 (28.1)	82.0 (27.8)	71.9 (22.2)	57.4 (14.1)	42.4 (5.8)	33.6 (0.9)	56.6 (13.7)
Daily mean °F (°C)	23.5 (−4.7)	25.9 (−3.4)	33.8 (1.0)	40.7 (4.8)	49.4 (9.7)	57.2 (14.0)	65.4 (18.6)	64.1 (17.8)	55.0 (12.8)	42.6 (5.9)	30.5 (−0.8)	22.5 (−5.3)	42.6 (5.9)
Mean daily minimum °F (°C)	11.9 (−11.2)	14.0 (−10.0)	20.8 (−6.2)	27.0 (−2.8)	35.3 (1.8)	42.5 (5.8)	48.3 (9.1)	46.2 (7.9)	38.1 (3.4)	27.7 (−2.4)	18.6 (−7.4)	11.5 (−11.4)	28.5 (−1.9)
Mean minimum °F (°C)	−15.8 (−26.6)	−9.1 (−22.8)	1.7 (−16.8)	13.2 (−10.4)	21.3 (−5.9)	30.9 (−0.6)	38.3 (3.5)	34.9 (1.6)	23.9 (−4.5)	9.1 (−12.7)	−5.4 (−20.8)	−13.8 (−25.4)	−24.1 (−31.2)
Record low °F (°C)	−38 (−39)	−39 (−39)	−34 (−37)	−6 (−21)	9 (−13)	22 (−6)	29 (−2)	19 (−7)	8 (−13)	−14 (−26)	−34 (−37)	−42 (−41)	−42 (−41)
Average precipitation inches (mm)	0.28 (7.1)	0.19 (4.8)	0.40 (10)	0.78 (20)	1.86 (47)	2.30 (58)	1.38 (35)	1.12 (28)	1.10 (28)	0.64 (16)	0.48 (12)	0.27 (6.9)	10.80 (274)
Average precipitation days (≥ 0.01 in)	5.4	5.0	6.1	7.4	11.9	11.6	8.4	7.0	6.6	7.1	5.9	6.3	88.7
Source: NOAA

== Education ==
The school districts for the community are Boulder Elementary School District and Jefferson High School District.

Jefferson High School in Boulder is part of Jefferson High School District #1, covering about 1,100 sq mi (2,800 km^{2}) in the northern half of Jefferson County. The district, based in Boulder, draws students from Basin, Clancy, Jefferson City and Montana City in addition to Boulder. About 280 students in grades 9 through 12 enrolled at the high school in 2007. The school had about 20 teachers and a student-teacher ratio of about 14 to 1. The district also serves students in Basin Elementary District 5, Boulder Elementary District 7, Clancy Elementary District 1, and Montana City Elementary District 27.

The town is served by Boulder Community Library.

== Media ==
The Boulder Monitor is a newspaper available either in print or online. It is printed weekly. A low-power radio station, KEME, 106.3 FM, owned by Jefferson County Disaster and Emergency Services, broadcasts from Boulder. The town also receives radio stations from Butte and Helena.

== Notable people ==
- Patrick Duffy, actor, is from Boulder.

== See also ==
- List of cities and towns in Montana
