= Whitehall, Montana =

- Town
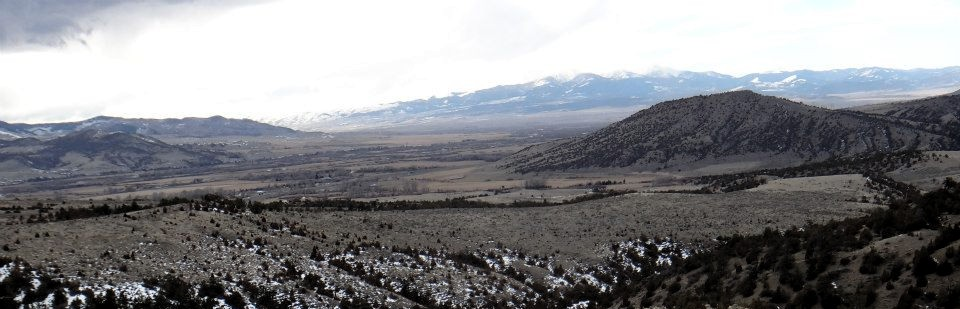

- Location of Whitehall, Montana
- Coordinates: 45°52′24″N 112°05′50″W
- Country: United States
- State: Montana
- County: Jefferson

Area
  - Total: 0.71 sq mi (1.83 km^{2})
  - Land: 0.71 sq mi (1.83 km^{2})
  - Water: 0 sq mi (0.00 km^{2})
- Elevation: 4,360 ft (1,330 m)

Population (2020)
  - Total: 1,006
  - Density: 1,426.9/sq mi (550.94/km^{2})
- Time zone: UTC-7 (Mountain (MST))
  - Summer (DST): UTC-6 (MDT)
- ZIP code: 59759
- Area code: 406
- FIPS code: 30-79900
- GNIS feature ID: 2413480
- Website: townofwhitehallmt.com

Whitehall is a town in Jefferson County, Montana, United States. The population was 1,006 at the 2020 census. It is part of the Helena, Montana micropolitan area.

== History ==
Whitehall began as a rail depot created by the Northern Pacific and Montana Railroad on September 25, 1889. The name for the depot came from E.G. Brooke, who was inspired by a similar town in which he stayed in Illinois while making his way westward. On September 3, 1890, the Jefferson County Commissioners accepted and filed the Townsite of Whitehall.

== Geography ==
Whitehall is in the Jefferson Valley, an area between the Tobacco Root and Highland Mountain ranges, and sits in the heart of the Deerlodge National Forest. The forest features pine and various species of fir, spruce and juniper.

Waterbodies include seven nearby rivers and multiple mountain lakes. These waters contain several types of trout.

According to the United States Census Bureau, the town has a total area of 0.67 square miles (1.74 km^{2}), all land.

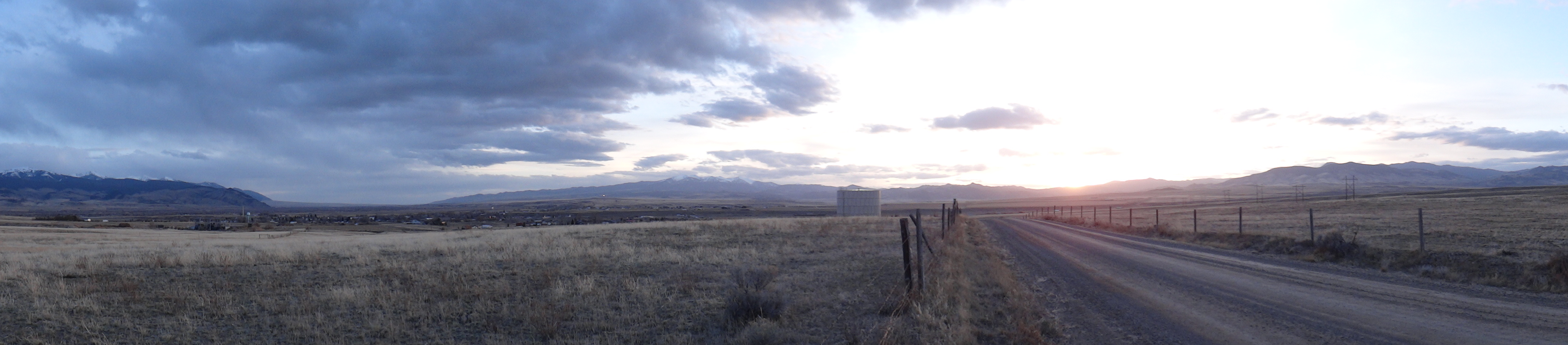
Whitehall Montana looking SW.

=== Climate ===
According to the Köppen Climate Classification system, Whitehall has a semi-arid climate, abbreviated "BSk" on climate maps.

Climate data for Whitehall, Montana
Month	Jan	Feb	Mar	Apr	May	Jun	Jul	Aug	Sep	Oct	Nov	Dec	Year
Mean daily maximum °F (°C)	32.2 (0.1)	37.4 (3.0)	43.2 (6.2)	56.5 (13.6)	65.4 (18.6)	71.5 (21.9)	84.1 (28.9)	83.2 (28.4)	71.4 (21.9)	60.1 (15.6)	44.1 (6.7)	37.2 (2.9)	57.2 (14.0)
Daily mean °F (°C)	20.9 (−6.2)	25.9 (−3.4)	31.3 (−0.4)	43 (6)	51.5 (10.8)	57.6 (14.2)	66.7 (19.3)	65.4 (18.6)	55.4 (13.0)	45.8 (7.7)	32.8 (0.4)	26.6 (−3.0)	43.6 (6.4)
Mean daily minimum °F (°C)	9.6 (−12.4)	14.5 (−9.7)	19.4 (−7.0)	29.5 (−1.4)	37.7 (3.2)	43.8 (6.6)	49.3 (9.6)	47.5 (8.6)	39.5 (4.2)	31.4 (−0.3)	21.4 (−5.9)	16 (−9)	29.9 (−1.2)
Average precipitation inches (mm)	0.3 (7.6)	0.2 (5.1)	0.5 (13)	0.8 (20)	1.8 (46)	2 (51)	0.9 (23)	0.8 (20)	1.1 (28)	0.5 (13)	0.2 (5.1)	0.3 (7.6)	9.5 (240)
Average snowfall inches (cm)	4.5 (11)	4.2 (11)	5.4 (14)	2.8 (7.1)	0.7 (1.8)	0 (0)	0 (0)	0 (0)	0.7 (1.8)	1.5 (3.8)	2.3 (5.8)	4.5 (11)	26.6 (68)
Source: Weatherbase

== Demographics ==
Historical population
Census	Pop.	Note	%±
1910	417		—
1920	629		50.8%
1930	553		−12.1%
1940	818		47.9%
1950	928		13.4%
1960	898		−3.2%
1970	1,035		15.3%
1980	1,030		−0.5%
1990	1,067		3.6%
2000	1,044		−2.2%
2010	1,038		−0.6%
2020	1,006		−3.1%
U.S. Decennial Census

=== 2010 census ===
As of the census of 2010, there were 1,038 people, 473 households, and 283 families residing in the town. The population density was 1,549.3 inhabitants per square mile (598.2/km^{2}). There were 538 housing units at an average density of 803.0 per square mile (310.0/km^{2}). The racial makeup of the town was 94.0% White, 0.2% African American, 1.7% Native American, 0.5% Asian, 0.1% from other races, and 3.5% from two or more races. Hispanic or Latino of any race were 2.0% of the population.

There were 473 households, of which 26.8% had children under the age of 18 living with them, 44.4% were married couples living together, 9.7% had a female householder with no husband present, 5.7% had a male householder with no wife present, and 40.2% were non-families. 35.3% of all households were made up of individuals, and 15.9% had someone living alone who was 65 years of age or older. The average household size was 2.19 and the average family size was 2.84.

The median age in the town was 45.7 years. 23% of residents were under the age of 18; 7% were between the ages of 18 and 24; 19.6% were from 25 to 44; 33% were from 45 to 64; and 17.4% were 65 years of age or older. The gender makeup of the town was 51.9% male and 48.1% female.

=== 2000 census ===
As of the census of 2000, there were 1,044 people, 450 households, and 297 families residing in the town. The population density was 1,527.3 inhabitants per square mile (589.7/km^{2}). There were 507 housing units at an average density of 741.7 per square mile (286.4/km^{2}). The racial makeup of the town was 94.54% White, 2.49% Native American, 0.29% Asian, 0.10% Pacific Islander, 0.10% from other races, and 2.49% from two or more races. Hispanic or Latino of any race were 1.72% of the population.

There were 450 households, out of which 27.3% had children under the age of 18 living with them, 54.2% were married couples living together, 9.3% had a female householder with no husband present, and 34.0% were non-families. 29.8% of all households were made up of individuals, and 15.3% had someone living alone who was 65 years of age or older. The average household size was 2.32 and the average family size was 2.86.

In the town, the population was spread out, with 25.2% under the age of 18, 5.7% from 18 to 24, 25.3% from 25 to 44, 23.9% from 45 to 64, and 20.0% who were 65 years of age or older. The median age was 41 years. For every 100 females, there were 93.3 males. For every 100 females age 18 and over, there were 86.0 males.

The median income for a household in the town was $29,940, and the median income for a family was $38,833. Males had a median income of $30,682 versus $19,643 for females. The per capita income for the town was $15,527. About 8.8% of families and 12.0% of the population were below the poverty line, including 15.7% of those under age 18 and 7.6% of those age 65 or over.

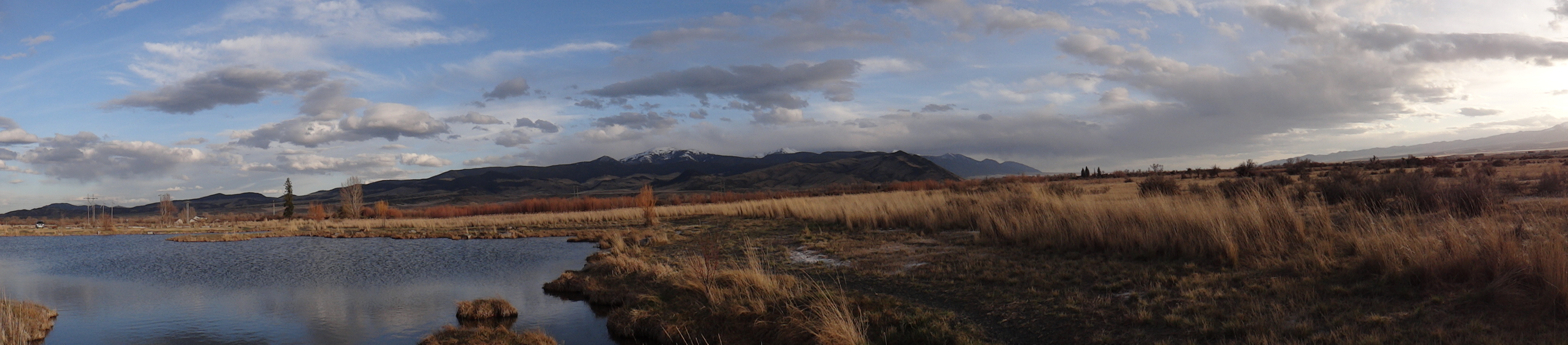
Tobacco Root Mountains from Piedmont Pond.

== Arts and culture ==
Jefferson Valley Museum displays the history of the area, from the Native American tribes to the arrival of the railroads. More than 10,000 artifacts are displayed in a restored dairy barn.

The Lewis and Clark Caverns are limestone caves open for guided tours during the summer. There are trails for hiking or bicycling, camping, and plenty of wildlife watching.

The Ringing Rocks area has unique rocks that resonate like a bell when struck.

Whitehall Community Library is a public library which serves the town.

== Recreation ==
The multiple nearby rivers give great opportunity for fishing. There are four lakes within 60 miles which allow for boating. The town is also near five ski resorts and three recreational hot springs. Whitehall is between two mountain ranges. Both have hiking trails, backpacking, and camping opportunities. The Sage Wall, a natural stone batholith, is located nearby.

== Government ==
Whitehall has a mayor and town council. There are six members in the council. Linda Jung was voted mayor in 2025. She replaced Mary Hensleigh who did not run for re-election.

== Education ==
Whitehall Public Schools has two components: Whitehall Elementary School District and Whitehall High School District. The school districts for the community are Whitehall Elementary School District and Whitehall High School District

The district includes Whitehall Elementary School (grades K-6), Whitehall Middle School (grades 7-8), and Whitehall High School (grades 9-12). They are a Class B school (108-306 students) which helps determine athletic competitions..

Whitehall's mascot is the Trojans, with school colors of purple and gold.

== Media ==
The local newspaper is The Whitehall Ledger. It is a weekly newspaper.

Two radio stations are licensed from Whitehall. KESW-LP is part of Jefferson County Radio, a network of stations owned by Jefferson County Disaster & Emergency Services. KQLR is a K-Love station, owned by a non-profit Christian ministry.

== Infrastructure ==
Interstate 90 passes by the town with access via exit 249. The terminus of Montana Highway 55 is in Whitehall, while Montana Highway 69 begins. Montana Highway 2 travels through town from east to west.

The nearest airport is Bert Mooney Airport in Butte.

Whitehall Medical Clinic provides local medical care. St. James Healthcare is the hospital in Butte.

== Notable people ==
- Sam Adams (1963– ), former mayor of Portland, Oregon.
- Chet Huntley (1911–1974), broadcaster, graduated from Whitehall High School.
- Rob "Robbie" Johnson (b. 1983), Major League Baseball player, played Little League in Whitehall.
- Bill Pullman (b. 1953), actor, has a ranch near town and lives there part-time.
