= Mammoth, Montana =

- Census-designated place
- Location within Montana Location within the United States
- Coordinates: 45°40′09″N 112°01′04″W
- Country: United States
- State: Montana
- County: Madison

Area
  - Total: 0.35 sq mi (0.91 km^{2})
  - Land: 0.35 sq mi (0.91 km^{2})
  - Water: 0 sq mi (0.00 km^{2})
- Elevation: 6,014 ft (1,833 m)

Population (2020)
  - Total: 4
  - Density: 11.4/sq mi (4.41/km^{2})
- Time zone: UTC-7 (Mountain (MST))
  - Summer (DST): UTC-6 (MDT)
- ZIP Codes: 59721 (Cardwell); 59747 (Pony)
- Area code: 406
- FIPS code: 30-47460
- GNIS feature ID: 2806644

Mammoth is an unincorporated community and census-designated place (CDP) in Madison County, Montana, United States. It is in the northern part of the county, in the valley of the South Boulder River within the northern end of the Tobacco Root Mountains. Via the South Boulder River, it is part of the Jefferson River watershed, one of the headwaters of the Missouri River.

Mammoth is reached by South Boulder Road, which leads north 11 miles (18 km) to Montana Highway 359 at a point 5 miles (8 km) south of Cardwell.

Mammoth was first listed as a CDP prior to the 2020 census, when it had a population of 4.

== Demographics ==
Historical population
Census	Pop.	Note	%±
2020	4		—
U.S. Decennial Census

== Education ==
The CDP is in the Harrison K-12 Schools school district.
