= Barton Gulch =

Archaeological type site in the USA

Coordinates: 45°13′21″N 112°06′47″W

Barton Gulch is an archaeological site in southwest Montana that has provided very important information concerning some of the earliest residents of the Paleo-Indian period in the northwest United States.

== Geography ==
The 19-acre (77,000 m^{2}) Barton Gulch site is located in Madison County on a tributary of the Ruby River between the Greenhorn Range and Ruby Range. Dr. Les Davis excavated Barton Gulch from 1987 through 1993, and found 37 features that were each arranged into four distinct aggregations. Each of these aggregations contains a central oxidized pit that is 30-centimeters deep and surrounds each basin. A string of small features, representing a living floor site, form a circle around each oxidized basin.

== History ==
Barton Gulch, also known as the Barton Gulch Alder Complex, was discovered in 1972 and first excavated in 1979. Barton Gulch is dated to 9400 RCYBP, and was actually during intensive mining projects in the late 1970s. Barton Gulch, along with the Alder site, are regarded as the type sites for the Blackwater Draw Paleo-Indian archaeological culture, and believed to be a Clovis culture. Most of the excavations of Barton Gulch were done by Dr. Les Davis, a professor at Montana State University, in the late 1980s and early 1990s. There has also been an intermediate amount of mining done at Barton Gulch for gold due to the presumption that the source of gold found in Barton Creek could have moved its way down the channel into the area.

== Climate ==
During the late Pleistocene period, the climate began a dramatic change. It is unknown how and why exactly the climate changed, but scientists speculate that the Earth's orbit around the Sun changed, leading to an evident increase in the amount of sunlight exposed to the planet. As the Pleistocene period gave way to the Paleo-Indian period, so did the harsh winter climates give way to a suitable warm climate. Strong evidence for the warm climate is the many warm-weather plants that have been found during excavations at Barton Gulch.

== Flora and fauna ==
Barton Gulch included various animals that have rarely been seen in Paleo-Indian cultures. Such animals included the cottontail rabbit (Sylvilagus sp.), hare (Lepus sp.), mink (Mustela vison), porcupine (Orithizon dorsatum) and deer (Odocoileus sp.). The bones of the deer were used to make hammerstones and other small tools. Small tools that were made from the bones of the animals include knives, flake tools, end scrapers, abrading stones and points. Also, due to the warm weather, Barton Gulch contained many different edible plant species. Identified at Barton Gulch were remains of charred seeds, stems, spines, and other elements from over thirty different plant species. These plans were recovered from a series of over one hundred cooking features. These discoveries suggest that the people of the area used plants for various purposes such as food, medicine, in ceremonies, tools and weapons.

== People ==
The people of Barton Gulch are thought to have been seasonally semi nomadic, meaning that although the people's living habits were largely nomadic, they do participate in planting crops at specific locations. Excavations suggest that the people were logistically organized, kin-related aggregates of hunter-gatherers. Remains of earth ovens at Barton Gulch were identified as a possible technique of processing plants and animals into food. The presence of earth ovens and other cooking features implies that the people had detailed procedures for preparing plant and animal remains. The identification of the many different tools from the animal bones suggests that there were many different activities being done by the men and women of Barton Gulch.

== Notes ==
- Beauchamp, R; Boyce D (2007), Foragers of the Terminal Pleistocene in North America, U of Nebraska Press, ISBN 0-8032-4802-4
- Bruhns, K. O; Stothert, K. E (1999), Women in Ancient America, University of Oklahoma Press, ISBN 0-8061-3169-1
- Nelson, S. M (2006), Handbook of Gender in Archaeology, Rowman Altamira, ISBN 0-7591-0678-9
- Scarre, Christopher (2005), Human Past: World Prehistory and the Development of Human Societies, Thames & Hudson Publishing, ISBN 0-500-28531-4
- Soffer, O (1993), From Kostenki to Clovis: Upper Paleolithic Paleo-Indian Adaptations, Plenum Publishers, ISBN 0-306-44271-X
- Thomas, D. H (2000) Skull Wars: Kennewick Man, Archaeology, and the Battle for Native American Identity, Basic Books, ISBN 0-465-09225-X
