= Brandon, Montana =

- Census-designated place
- Location within Montana Location within the United States
- Coordinates: 45°28′01″N 112°07′43″W
- Country: United States
- State: Montana
- County: Madison

Area
  - Total: 0.44 sq mi (1.15 km^{2})
  - Land: 0.44 sq mi (1.15 km^{2})
  - Water: 0 sq mi (0.00 km^{2})
- Elevation: 5,709 ft (1,740 m)

Population (2020)
  - Total: 46
  - Density: 103.9/sq mi (40.13/km^{2})
- Time zone: UTC-7 (Mountain (MST))
  - Summer (DST): UTC-6 (MDT)
- ZIP Code: 59749 (Sheridan)
- Area code: 406
- FIPS code: 30-09400
- GNIS feature ID: 2806642

Brandon is an unincorporated community and census-designated place (CDP) in Madison County, Montana, United States. It is in the northwestern part of the county, at the western base of the Tobacco Root Mountains, in the valley of Mill Creek. Via Mill Creek Road it is 3 miles (5 km) southwest to Sheridan in the Ruby Valley.

Brandon was first listed as a CDP for the 2020 census, when it had a population of 46.

== Demographics ==
Historical population
Census	Pop.	Note	%±
2020	46		—
U.S. Decennial Census

== Education ==
The CDP is in the Sheridan Elementary School District and the Sheridan High School District. Both Sheridan elementary and high school districts are components of Sheridan Public Schools.
