= Jefferson Island, Montana =

Unincorporated community in Montana, U.S.

Coordinates: 45°51′03″N 111°56′26″W

Jefferson Island is an unincorporated community in Madison County, in the U.S. state of Montana.

Montana Highway 359 passes through the community. It is about 1 mile south of Cardwell. The Jefferson River flows to the north.

== History ==
A post office was established as Lahood in 1909, the name was changed to Jefferson Island in 1912, and the post office was discontinued in 1954. The community took its name from a nearby river island in the Jefferson River.
