= Boulder River (southwestern Montana) =

River in Montana, United States

- Location of the mouth of the southwestern Boulder River in Montana

Location
- Country: United States
- State: Montana
- County: Jefferson

Physical characteristics
- Source: Continental Divide
  - location: Boulder Mountains, Beaverhead-Deerlodge National Forest
  - coordinates: 46°11′22″N 112°31′54″W
  - elevation: 7,339 ft (2,237 m)
- Mouth: Jefferson River
  - location: Cardwell
  - coordinates: 45°52′01″N 111°56′44″W
  - elevation: 4,278 ft (1,304 m)
- Length: 77.3 mi (124.4 km)
- Discharge
  - location: Boulder
  - average: 119 cu/ft. per sec.

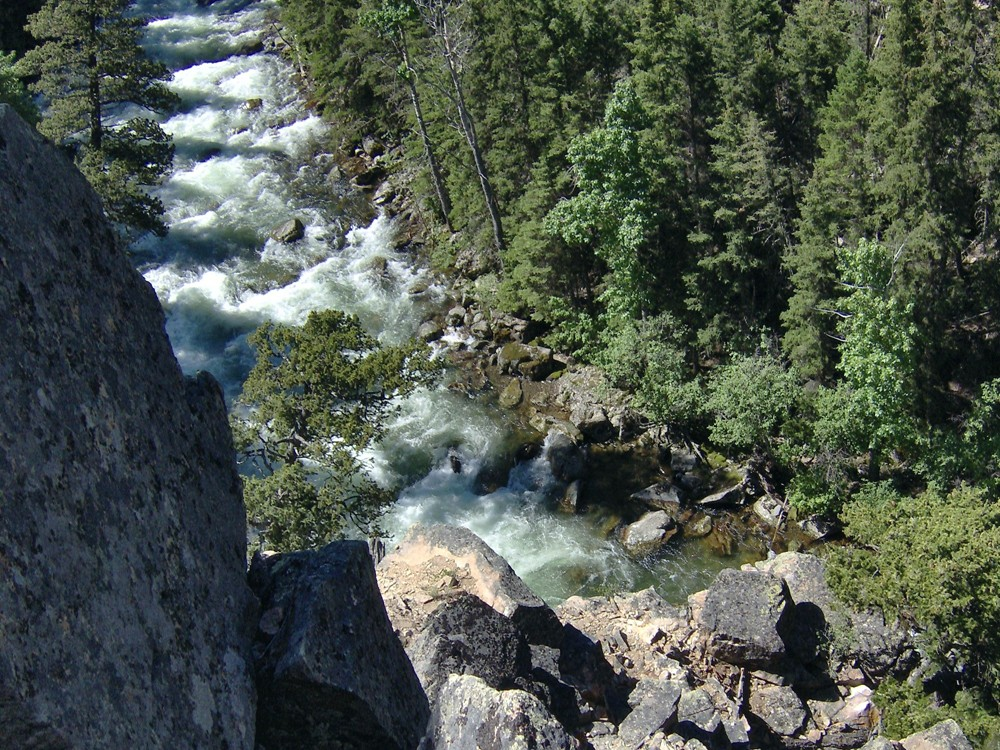
Section of the upper Boulder River

The Boulder River is a 77-mile (124 km) tributary of the Jefferson River in southwestern Montana in the United States.

It rises in the Rocky Mountains at the continental divide in the Beaverhead-Deerlodge National Forest in western Jefferson County. It flows east and southeast through the mountains past Boulder, then south to join the Jefferson near Cardwell.

Game fish in the river include brook, brown, and rainbow trout, and mountain whitefish. Brown trout are most prevalent in the last 2 miles (3 km), near the mouth, and the other three species are more prevalent in the reach upstream of the town of Boulder. The lowermost 12 miles (19 km) of the river is affected by irrigation withdrawals, and the reach below the community of Basin is affected by seepage from old mines and tailings.

== See also ==
- List of rivers of Montana
- Montana Stream Access Law
