= Ruby Range (Montana) =

Mountain range in Montana, US

- Location within Montana

Highest point
- Peak: Ruby Peak
- Elevation: 9,391 ft (2,862 m)
- Coordinates: 45°18′46″N 112°13′41″W

Geography
- Country: United States
- State: Montana

The Ruby Range is a mountain range in Madison and Beaverhead counties Montana. The range lies east of Dillon and southwest of Sheridan. The highest point, Ruby Peak with an elevation of 9,391 feet (2,862 m), lies in the northeast portion of the range. Gordon Peak with an elevation of 8,478 ft (2,584 m) lies in the southwest part of the range to the southeast of Dillon. The range is oriented NE–SW with a length of about 42.7 kilometres (26.5 mi). The Beaverhead River lies to the northwest of the range. Ruby River runs along the southeast and east flanks of the range with Ruby Reservoir on the southeast flank. Blacktail Deer Creek drains the southwest portion of the range and the Blacktail Mountains lie to the southwest. The Tobacco Root Mountains and the Greenhorn Range lie to the northeast and east respectively.

The Bureau of Land Management (BLM) owns most of the range, and 26,611 acres of BLM land are protected as a Wilderness Study Area.

The Rubies are dry mountains, so springs are few. The terrain is steep, especially in the northern end, with more than half the land above 8,000'. This causes trees to be stunted in the shallow soils. Despite this, forest cover is extensive, with Douglas-fir, lodgepole pine, and spruce common, while the highest slopes are home to vast stands of pure limber pine intermixed with small parks, a habitat type found more commonly far to the south. Other features of the Rubies include free-standing rock walls, caves, cliffs, and talus. Wildlife includes a few elk, a large mule deer herd and excellent blue grouse habitat.

== See also ==
- List of mountain ranges in Montana
