= Pony, Montana =

- Census-designated place
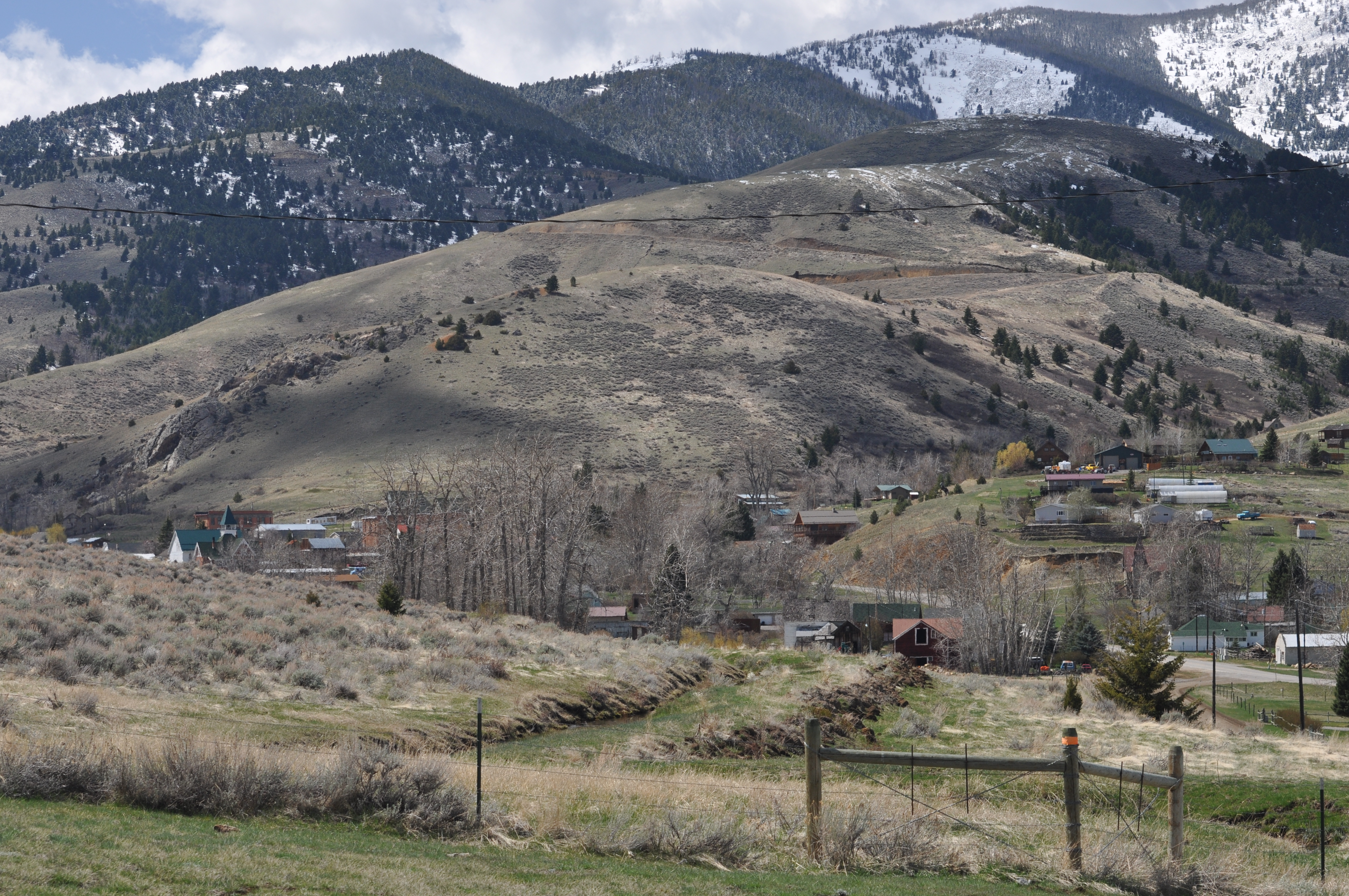
- Pony, Montana
- Interactive map of Pony, Montana
- Coordinates: 45°49′38″N 111°52′34″W
- Country: United States
- State: Montana
- County: Madison

Area
  - Total: 1.34 sq mi (3.48 km^{2})
  - Land: 1.34 sq mi (3.48 km^{2})
  - Water: 0 sq mi (0.00 km^{2})

Population (2020)
  - Total: 127
  - Density: 94.6/sq mi (36.54/km^{2})
- FIPS code: 30-58900
- GNIS feature ID: 2583835
- Pony Historic District
- U.S. National Register of Historic Places
- U.S. Historic district
- Location within Montana Location within the United States
- Area: 192 acres (78 ha)
- Architect: H.M. Patterson
- Architectural style: Queen Anne
- MPS: Pony MRA
- NRHP reference No.: 87001264
- Added to NRHP: August 4, 1987

Pony is an unincorporated community and census-designated place in northeastern Madison County, Montana, United States, on the eastern edge of the Tobacco Root Mountains. As of the 2020 census, it had a population of 127. It includes the 192-acre (78 ha) Pony Historic District, a historic district with 95 contributing buildings listed on the National Register of Historic Places.

== History ==
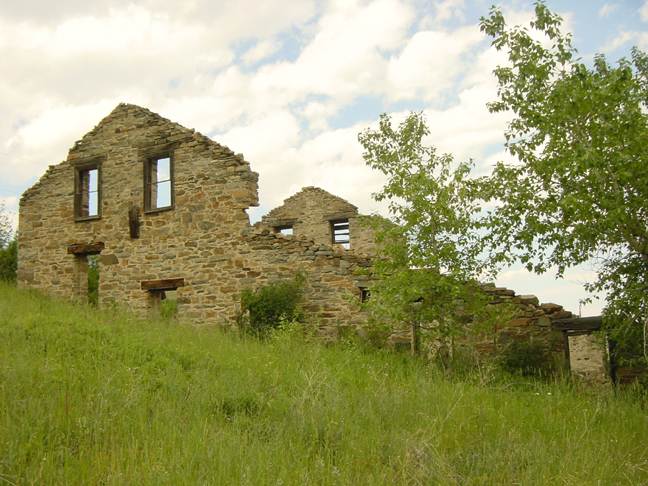
Ore mill in Pony

The town gained its name from one of its early miners, Tecumseth Smith, a man nicknamed "Pony" because of his diminutive size.

Settled in the 1860s, Pony was a prosperous gold-mining community in the late nineteenth century, with at least 5,000 residents. Mining operations declined in the early 20th century, and all were closed by 1922.

A number of historic buildings from Pony's boom era remain in the old town today. Major buildings are managed, voluntarily, by the Pony Homecoming Club, a non-profit organization that maintains the town's public spaces.

== Geography ==
Montana Highway 283 (Pony Road) connects the town with U.S. Route 287 in Harrison, 6 miles (10 km) to the northeast. According to the U.S. Census Bureau, the Pony CDP has an area of 1.34 square miles (3.47 km^{2}), all of it recorded as land. North Willow Creek flows through the community, running northeast and joining the Jefferson River south of Three Forks.

== Demographics ==
Historical population
Census	Pop.	Note	%±
2010	118		—
2020	127		7.6%
U.S. Decennial Census

== Education ==
The CDP is in the Harrison K-12 Schools school district.

== Notable people ==
Former Montana Lieutenant Gov. Karl Ohs owned a ranch in Pony.
