= Union City, Montana =

- Union City
- U.S. National Register of Historic Places
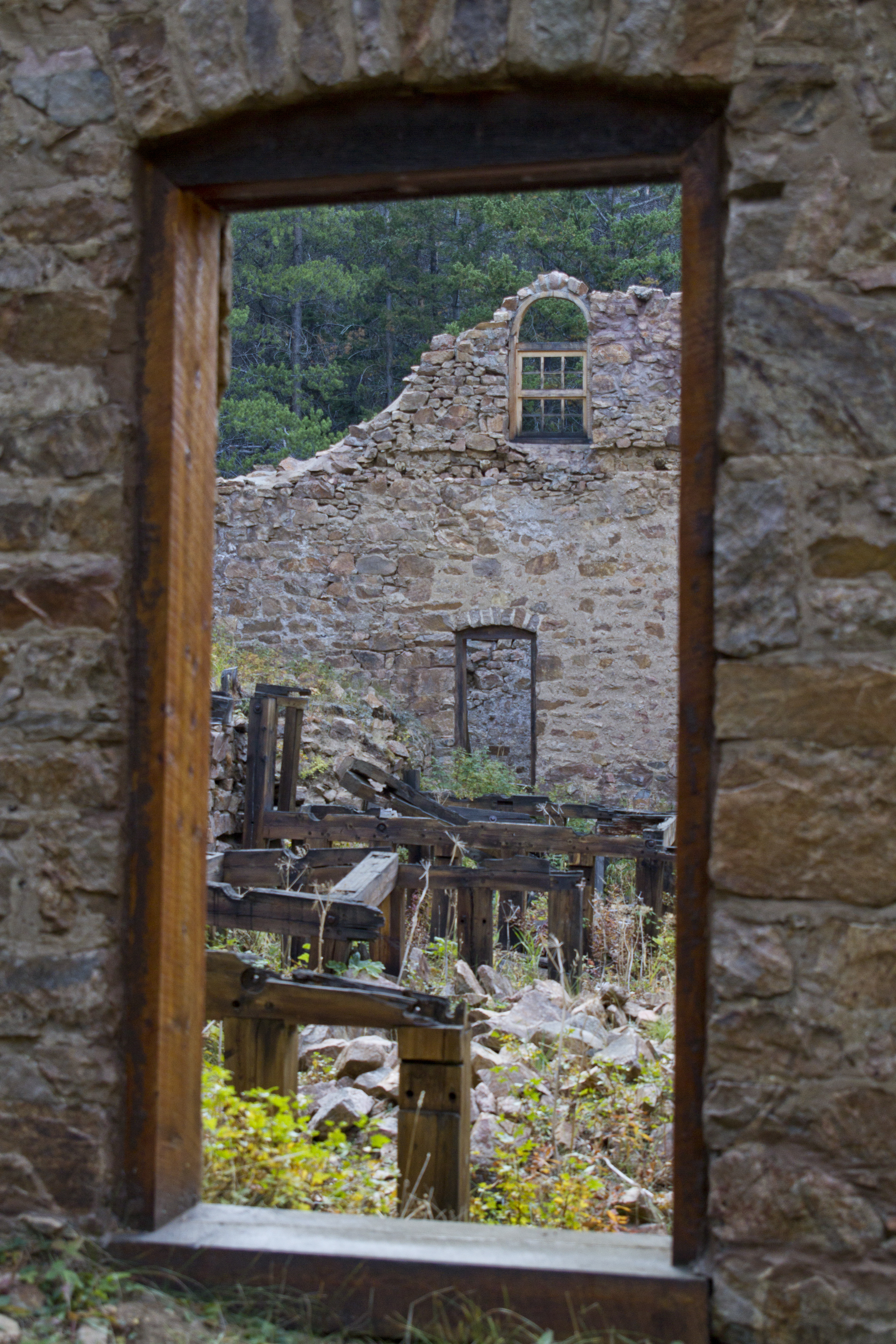

- Location within Montana Location within the United States
- Location: Madison County, Montana
- Nearest city: Virginia City, Montana
- Coordinates: 45°12′30″N 111°56′33″W
- Built: 1867
- Architect: Griffith & Thompson
- Architectural style: Mining mill
- NRHP reference No.: 99000261
- Added to NRHP: February 26, 1999

Union City is a ghost town in Madison County, Montana, United States. Its elevation is 7,582 feet (2,311 m), and it is located at 45°12′30″N 111°56′3″W (45.2082579, -111.9424776).

Founded in 1867 as a mining camp, the community was abandoned after the claims ran out. The entire site, now owned by the Bureau of Land Management, was added to the National Register of Historic Places in 1999.
