= Harrison, Montana =

- Census-designated place
- Location in Madison County and the state of Montana
- Coordinates: 45°42′16″N 111°47′04″W
- Country: United States
- State: Montana
- County: Madison

Area
  - Total: 0.17 sq mi (0.45 km^{2})
  - Land: 0.17 sq mi (0.45 km^{2})
  - Water: 0 sq mi (0.00 km^{2})
- Elevation: 4,905 ft (1,495 m)

Population (2020)
  - Total: 105
  - Density: 601.6/sq mi (232.28/km^{2})
- Time zone: UTC-7 (Mountain (MST))
  - Summer (DST): UTC-6 (MDT)
- ZIP code: 59735
- Area code: 406
- FIPS code: 30-34525
- GNIS feature ID: 2408353

Harrison is an unincorporated community and census-designated place (CDP) in Madison County, Montana, United States. The population was 105 at the 2020 census, down from 137 in 2010.

The town began as "Ferguson", a stage stop on the road to Virginia City. The Northern Pacific Railroad constructed a branch line in 1889. Eventually the town was called Harrison after an early settler, Henry C. Harrison.

== Geography ==
Harrison is located in northeastern Madison County and U.S. Route 287 passes through town, leading northeast 20 miles (32 km) to Three Forks and south 26 miles (42 km) to Ennis. Willow Creek Reservoir is 4 miles (6 km) to the east.

According to the U.S. Census Bureau, the Harrison CDP has an area of 0.18 square miles (0.47 km^{2}), all land. The community sits between North Willow Creek and South Willow Creek, which flow northeast to form Willow Creek, a tributary of the Jefferson River.

== Demographics ==
Historical population
Census	Pop.	Note	%±
2000	162		—
2010	137		−15.4%
2020	105		−23.4%
U.S. Decennial Census

As of the census of 2000, there were 162 people, 64 households, and 44 families residing in the CDP. The population density was 704.9 inhabitants per square mile (272.2/km^{2}). There were 75 housing units at an average density of 326.3 per square mile (126.0/km^{2}). The racial makeup of the CDP was 96.91% White, 1.85% Native American, 0.62% Asian, and 0.62% from two or more races. Hispanic or Latino of any race were 1.23% of the population.

There were 64 households, out of which 39.1% had children under the age of 18 living with them, 56.3% were married couples living together, 9.4% had a female householder with no husband present, and 29.7% were non-families. 25.0% of all households were made up of individuals, and 17.2% had someone living alone who was 65 years of age or older. The average household size was 2.53 and the average family size was 3.07.

In the CDP, the population was spread out, with 32.7% under the age of 18, 3.7% from 18 to 24, 24.7% from 25 to 44, 21.0% from 45 to 64, and 17.9% who were 65 years of age or older. The median age was 38 years. For every 100 females, there were 107.7 males. For every 100 females age 18 and over, there were 87.9 males.

The median income for a household in the CDP was $36,875, and the median income for a family was $39,167. Males had a median income of $28,750 versus $16,250 for females. The per capita income for the CDP was $13,287. About 5.3% of families and 13.8% of the population were below the poverty line, including 22.7% of those under the age of eighteen and 14.8% of those 65 or over.

The median age for residents in Harrison is 44.7

18.1% of Harrison's residents live in poverty.

== Education ==
The CDP is in the Harrison K-12 Schools school district. Harrison Public School educates students from kindergarten through 12th grade. For the 2021-2022 school year, 95 students were enrolled. There are 3 schools in the district.

Harrison High School's team name is the Wildcats.

The school operates radio station KHWC-LP.

== See also ==
- List of census-designated places in Montana
