= Ruby River =

Tributary of the Beaverhead River

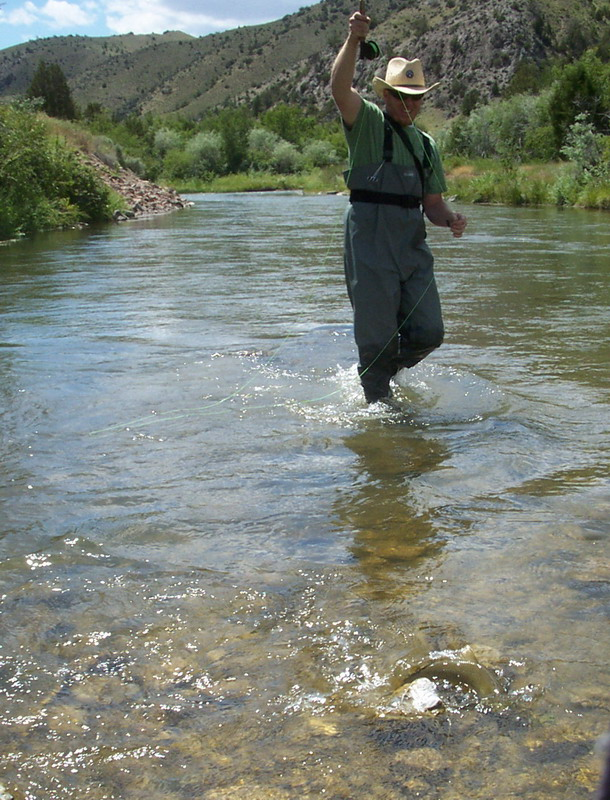
- Fly fisherman on the Ruby River

- Location of mouth

Location
- Country: United States
- State: Montana

Physical characteristics
- Mouth
  - coordinates: 45°31′13″N 112°20′25″W
  - elevation: 4,642 feet (1,415 m)
- Length: 76 miles (122 km)
- Basin size: Snowcrest Range and Gravelly Range
- Discharge
  - location: near Twin Bridges
  - average: 199 cu ft/s (5.6 m^{3}/s)

Basin features
- River system: Missouri River

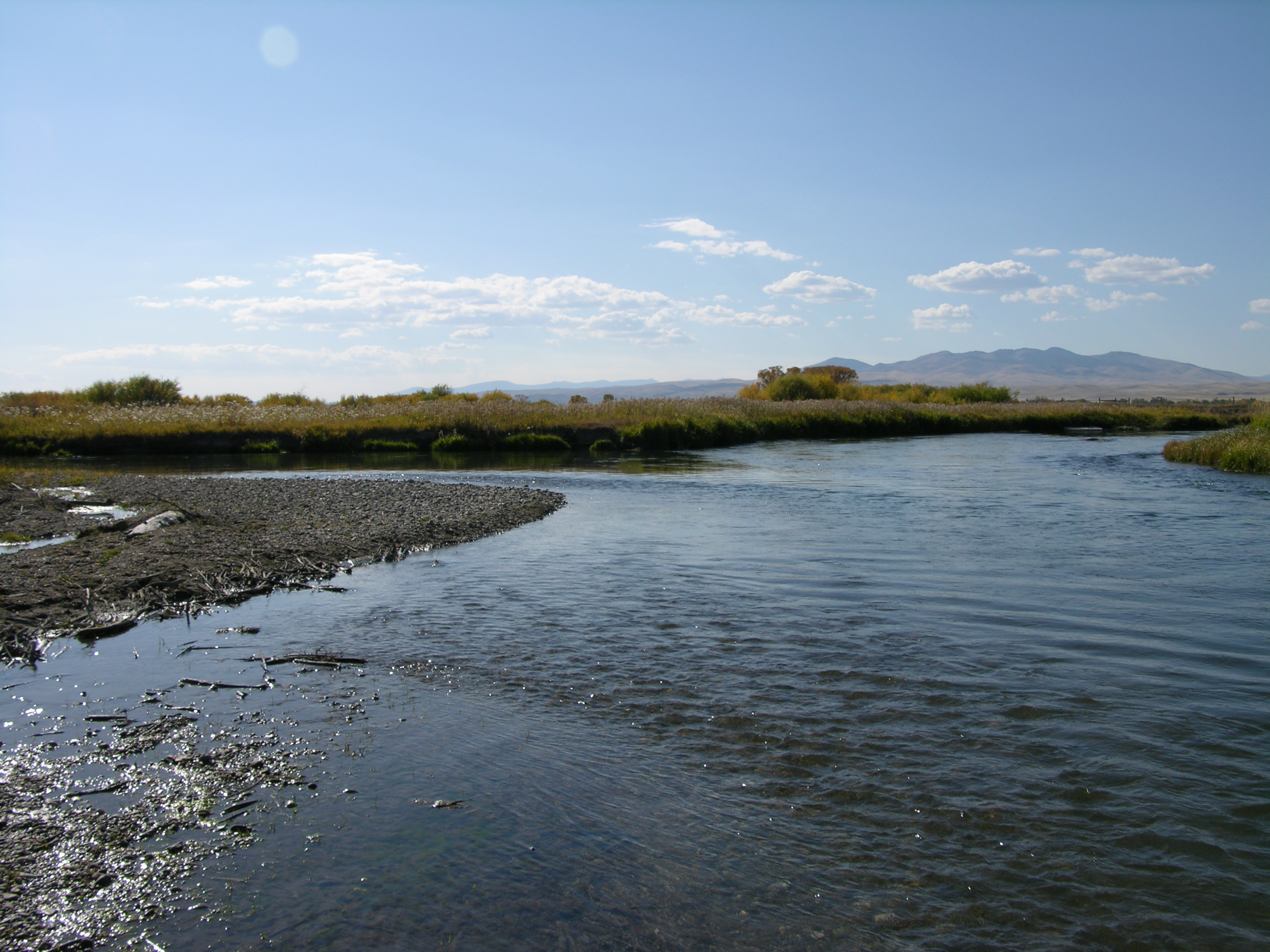
Confluence of Ruby and Beaverhead rivers

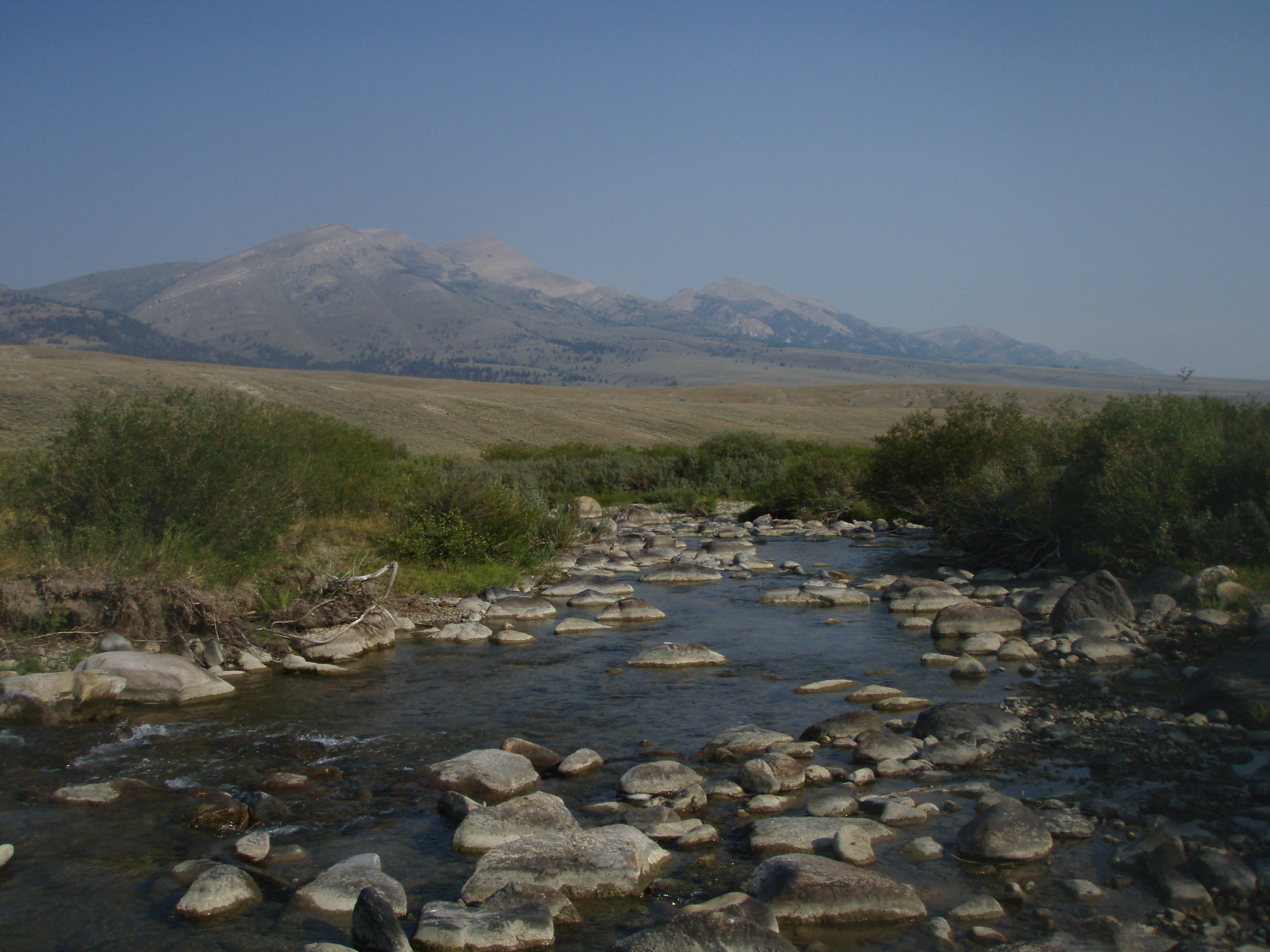
Upper Ruby River

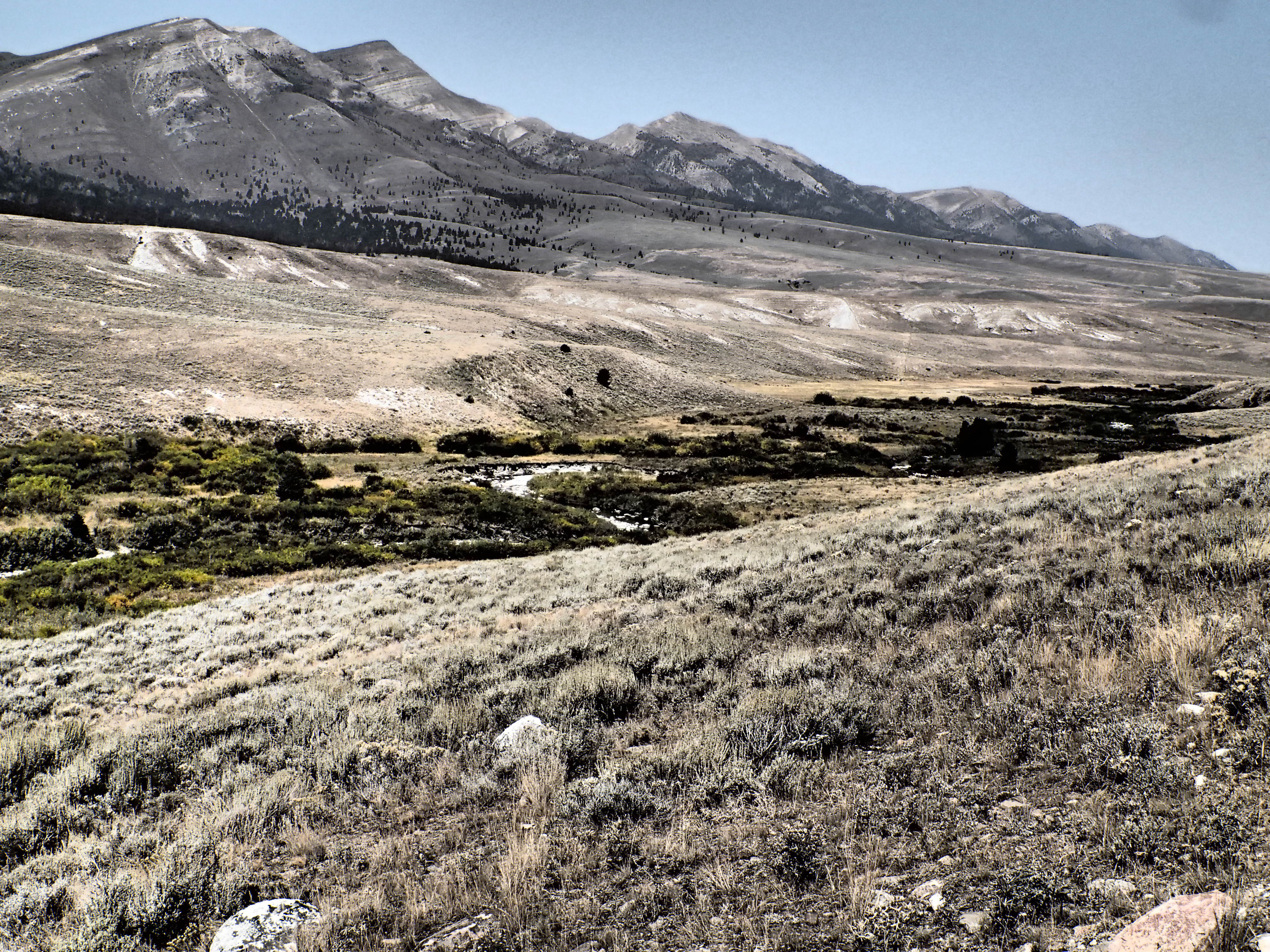
Upper Ruby River Valley

The Ruby River is a tributary of the Beaverhead River, approximately 76 mi (122 km) long, in southwestern Montana in the United States. It rises in the Beaverhead National Forest in southwestern Madison County between the Snowcrest Range and the Gravelly Range. It flows north through the Ruby River Reservoir, past Alder, then northwest, flowing between the Tobacco Root Mountains to the northeast and the Ruby Range to the southwest. It joins the Beaverhead near Twin Bridges. The Beaverhead becomes the Jefferson River 2 mi (3.2 km) downstream where it joins the Big Hole River.

The river has also been known by these various names: Pah-mamar-roi, Pak-sam-ma-oi, Pashmaroi, Passamari, Philanthropy River, Stinking Water Creek, Stinking Water River, Stinkingwater River.

The Ruby is a Class II river for stream access for recreational purposes.

== Ruby River angling ==
The Ruby River provides excellent fly fishing for anglers despite some battles with whirling disease and a massive fish kill in the lower stretches in 1994.

The upper stretch of the river, above Ruby Reservoir, has excellent fly fishing for rainbows, cutthroats and grayling. The lower stretch of the river, below Ruby Dam, provides excellent brown trout fishing. The average size of browns runs between 10 and 14 inches, with some fish reaching 18–20 inches. Because of limited access, fishing pressure on the lower river varies. Along private stretches, the river is rarely fished. Most of the angling is done at the few state access sites below the dam. This can cause significant crowding along those stretches, especially during the summer months.

=== Seyler Lane access litigation ===
In 2004, the Montana Public Land and Water Access Association (PLWAA) sued Madison County over access to the Ruby river via the Seyler Lane bridge south of Twin Bridges. Landowner James Cox Kennedy who had recently purchased the property was denying access to recreationalists via the Seyler Lane bridge. The litigation was finally resolved in 2014 when the Montana Supreme Court ruled in favor of the PLAWAA that there was an historic prescriptive easement at the bridge for recreational access. The litigation is a key milestone in Montana's Stream Access Law.

== See also ==
- List of rivers of Montana
- Montana Stream Access Law
