= McAllister, Montana =

- Census-designated place
- Location within Montana Location within the United States
- Coordinates: 45°26′40″N 111°43′56″W
- Country: United States
- State: Montana
- County: Madison

Area
  - Total: 2.27 sq mi (5.88 km^{2})
  - Land: 2.27 sq mi (5.88 km^{2})
  - Water: 0 sq mi (0.00 km^{2})
- Elevation: 4,889 ft (1,490 m)

Population (2020)
  - Total: 278
  - Density: 122.5/sq mi (47.31/km^{2})
- Time zone: UTC-7 (Mountain (MST))
  - Summer (DST): UTC-6 (MDT)
- ZIP code: 59740
- Area code: 406
- GNIS feature ID: 2806645
- FIPS code: 30-46225

McAllister is an unincorporated community and census-designated place in Madison County, Montana, United States. As of the 2020 census, it had a population of 278. McAllister is located on U.S. Route 287, 6 miles (10 km) north of Ennis. The community has a post office with ZIP code 59740.

The post office opened in 1869 under the name "Meadow Creek". It was renamed in 1896 for James Alexander McAllister Jr., son of a couple who settled in the area in 1871.

== Geography ==
McAllister is in northeastern Madison County, on the west side of Ennis Lake, an impoundment of the Madison River. According to the U.S. Census Bureau, the McAllister CDP has an area of 2.27 square miles (5.88 km^{2}), all land.

== Demographics ==
Historical population
Census	Pop.	Note	%±
2020	278		—
U.S. Decennial Census

== Education ==
It is in Ennis K-12 Schools school district.
