= Montana Stream Access Law =

Law in the State of Montana

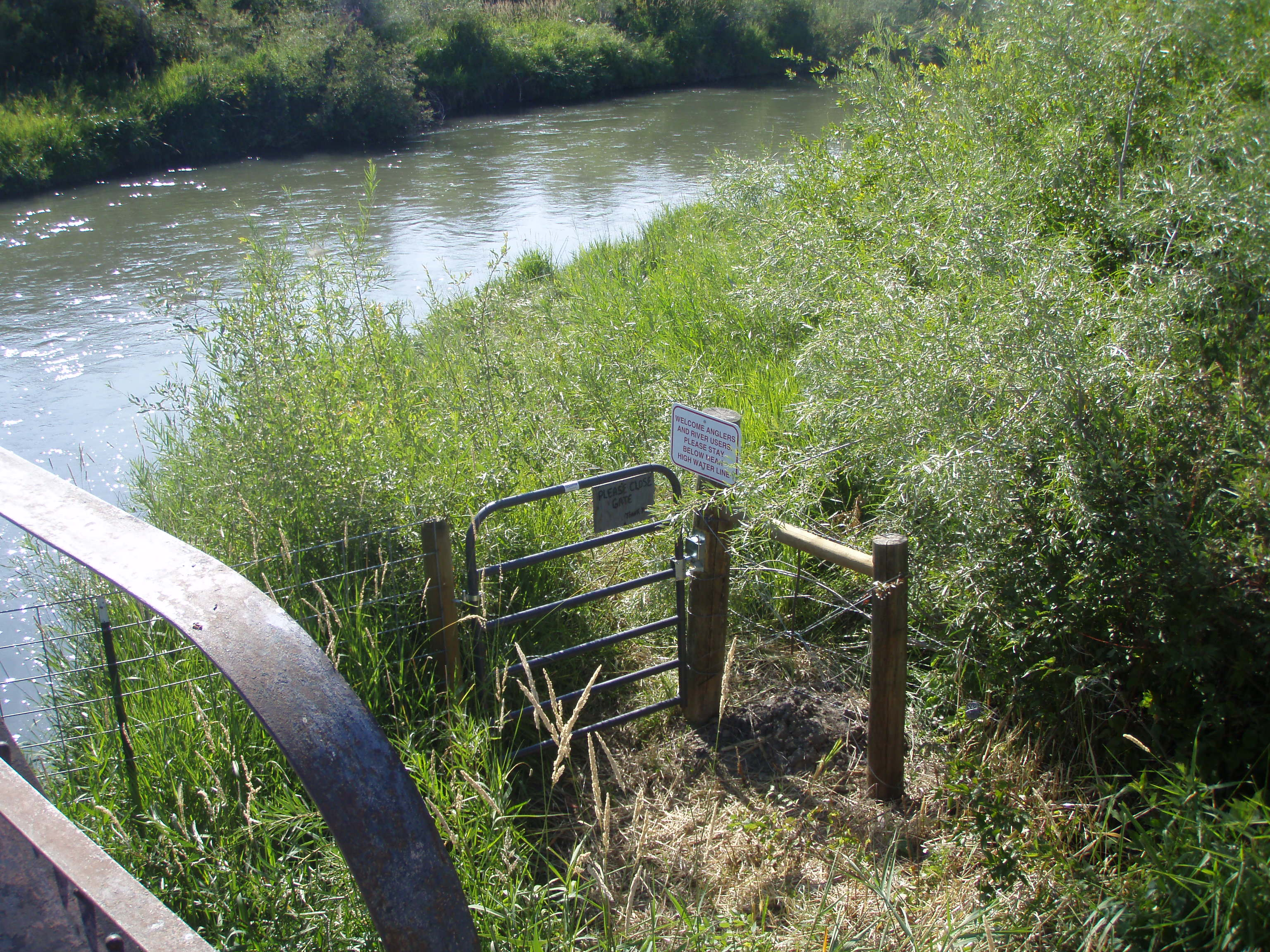
Favorable posted county road bridge crossing on East Gallatin River near Belgrade, MT

The Montana Stream Access Law says that anglers, floaters and other recreationists in Montana have full use of most natural waterways between the high-water marks for fishing and floating, along with swimming and other river or stream-related activities. In 1984, the Montana Supreme Court held that the streambed of any river or stream that has the capability to be used for recreation can be accessed by the public regardless of whether the river is navigable or who owns the streambed property. On January 16, 2014, the Montana Supreme Court, in a lawsuit filed by the Public Land/Water Access Association over access via county bridges on the Ruby River in Madison County, Montana reaffirmed the Montana Stream Access Law and the public's right to access rivers in Montana from public easements.

== Details of Stream Access ==
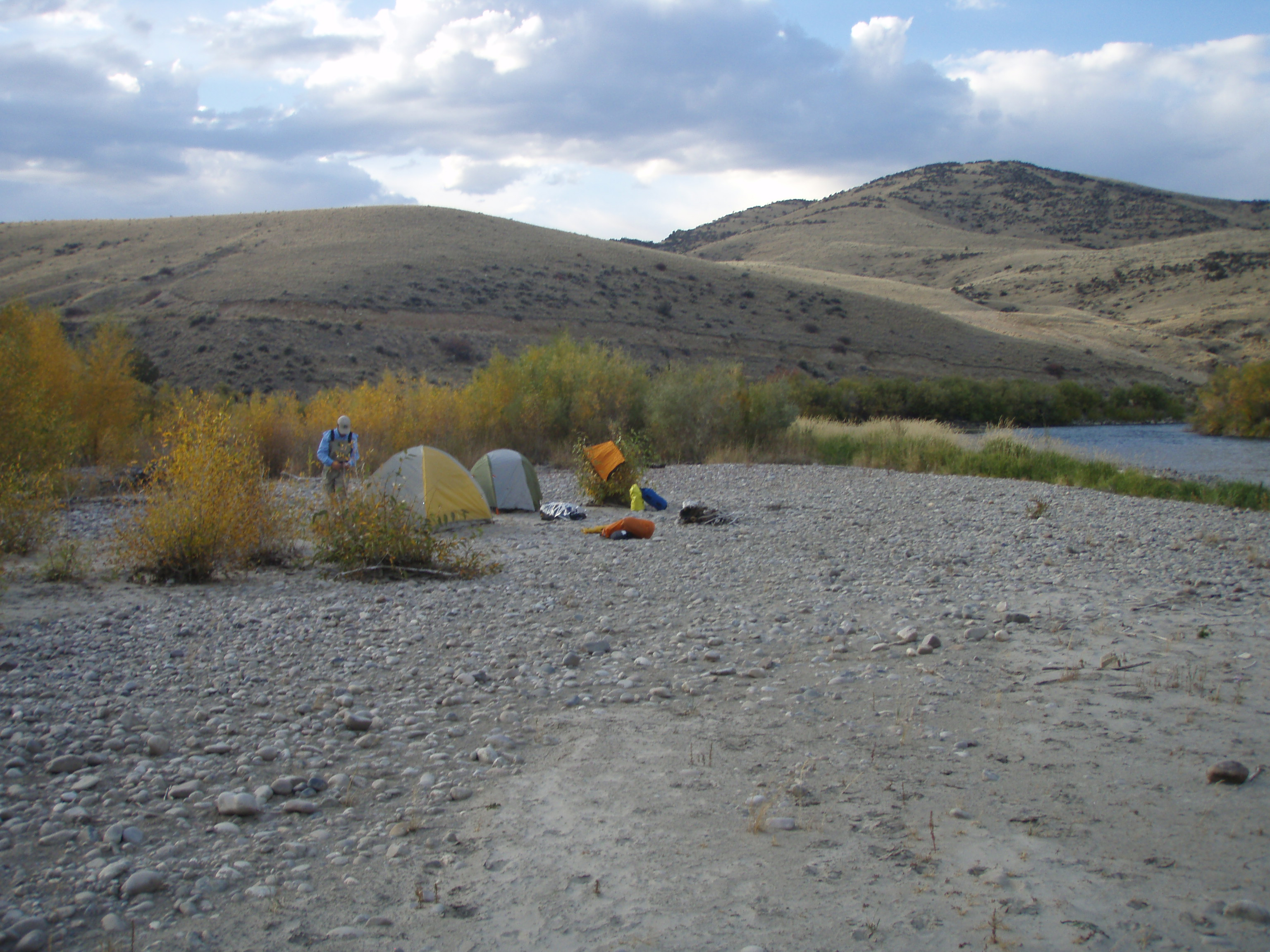
Camping on the Jefferson River below the high-water mark – an example of public stream access rights

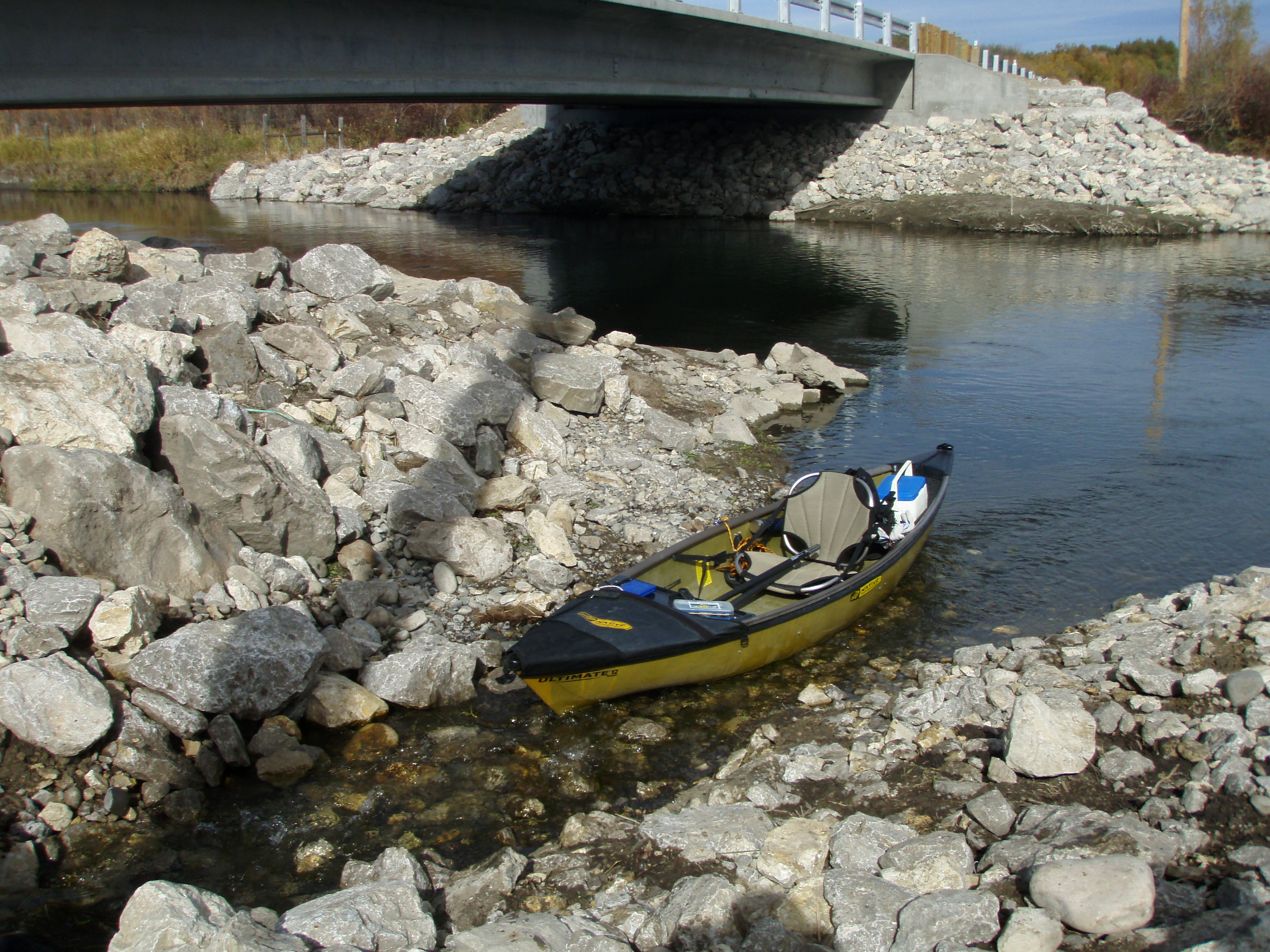
Public access from a bridge right-of-way

The core law creating the Montana Stream Access law began with Article IX, section 3 of the 1972 Montana Constitution, which addressed state ownership of Montana waters. In 1984 in Montana Coalition for Stream Access, Inc. v. Curran, the Montana Supreme Court held that "under the public trust doctrine and the 1972 Montana Constitution, any surface waters that are capable of recreational use may be so used by the public without regard to streambed ownership or navigability for nonrecreational purposes." This decision was expanded upon in the same year by Mont. Coalition for Stream Access, Inc. v. Hildreth. Both cases noted that streambed access did not imply that the public had a right to cross private lands to access streams. Following Curran and Hildreth, the Montana Legislature enacted the Stream Access Law in 1985. An Attorney General's opinion added trapping to the list of permissible recreational uses. The question of stream access at bridge crossings was resolved by HB 190 in 2009. The law states that a landowner may erect fences abutting bridge structures to control livestock so long as the fence includes approved access features such as gates, stiles etc..

== Classification of waters ==
The law creates two classifications of waters capable of recreational use: Class I and Class II. Class I are waters which are capable of recreational use and have been declared navigable or which are capable of specific kinds of commercial activity including commercial outfitting with multi-person watercraft. Class II waters are all other rivers and streams capable of recreational use that are not Class I waters.

Class I Waters

- Kootenai River Drainage
  - Kootenai River - from Libby Dam to the Idaho border
  - Lake Creek - from Chase cut-off-road to its confluence with the Kootenai River
  - Yaak River - from Yaak Falls to its confluence with the Kootenai River
- Flathead River Drainage
  - South fork of the Flathead - from Youngs creek to Hungry Horse reservoir
  - Middle fork of the Flathead - from Schaffer creek to its confluence with the Flathead River
  - Flathead River (mainstem) - to its confluence with the Clark Fork River
- Clark Fork of the Columbia River Drainage
  - Clark Fork River - from Warm Spring Creek to the Idaho border
  - North Fork of the Blackfoot - from highway 200 east of Ovando to its confluence with the mainstem of the Blackfoot River
  - Blackfoot River - from the Cedar Meadow fishing access site west of Helmville to its confluence with the Clark Fork River
  - Bitterroot River - from the confluence of the East and West forks to its confluence with the Clark Fork River
  - Rock Creek - from the confluence of the West fork to its confluence with the Clark Fork River
- Missouri River Drainage
  - Missouri River - from Three Forks to the North Dakota border
  - Beaverhead River - from Clark Canyon Dam to its confluence with the Jefferson River
  - Big Hole River - from Fishtrap fishing access downstream from Wisdom to its confluence with the Jefferson River
  - Gallatin River - from Taylors Fork to its confluence with the Missouri River
  - Jefferson River - to its confluence with the Missouri River
  - Madison River - from Quake Lake to its confluence with the Missouri River
  - Dearborn River - from Highway 431 bridge to its confluence with the Missouri River
  - Sun River - from Gibson Dam to its confluence with the Missouri River
  - Smith River - from the Camp Baker Fishing Access site near Ft. Logan to its confluence with the Missouri River
  - Marias River - from Tiber Dam to its confluence with the Missouri River
  - Judith River - from the confluence with Big Spring Creek to its confluence with the Missouri River
- Yellowstone River Drainage
  - Yellowstone River - from Yellowstone National Park to the North Dakota border
  - Bighorn River - from Yellowtail Dam to its confluence with the Yellowstone River
  - Tongue River - from Tongue River Dam to its confluence with the Yellowstone River

== See also ==
- Public trust doctrine
- Water law
- List of rivers of Montana

== Advocates for Montana public stream access ==
- Public Land/Water Access Association - The mission of the association is to maintain, restore, and perpetuate public access to the boundaries of all Montana public land and waters.
- Montana River Action - The clean flowing waters of Montana belong to the people and are held in trust by the State for a pollution-free healthful environment guaranteed by our Montana Constitution. Montana River Action's mission is to protect and restore rivers, streams and other water bodies.
- Montana Wildlife Federation - Dedicated to conservation and preservation of Montana's wildlife, lands, waters and Montana fair-chase hunting and fishing heritage; Prioritizing public access to public wildlife and public lands.

== Advocates for reduced Montana public stream access ==
- Property and Environment Research Center (PERC) - Improving environmental quality through property rights and markets.
- Montana Farm Bureau Federation Agricultural organization supporting interests of irrigators and landowners.
