= Type site =

Archaeological site that defines a culture

In archaeology, a type site (American English) or type-site (British English) is the site used to define a particular archaeological culture or other typological unit, which is often named after it. For example, discoveries at La Tène and Hallstatt led scholars to divide the European Iron Age into the La Tène culture and Hallstatt culture, named after their respective type sites.

The concept is similar to type localities in geology and type specimens in biology.

== Notable type sites ==
=== Africa ===
- Nok (Kaduna, Nigeria), of the Nok culture

=== East Asia ===
- Banpo (Yangshao culture, Neolithic Yangshao culture, China)
- Liangzhu Town, near Hangzhou (Liangzhu culture, Neolithic, China)
- Songguk-ri (Middle Mumun culture, southern Korea)
- Suemura cluster of kilns – Kilns of Sue pottery (Middle and Late Kofun period, Osaka, Japan)
- Sanage cluster of kilns — Kilns of Green Glazed Ware and Ash Glazed Ware (Nara and Heian period, Aichi Prefecture, Japan)

=== Europe ===
- a river terrace of the River Somme (Abbeville, France), of the Abbevillian culture
- Aurignac (Haute Garonne, France), of the Aurignacian culture
- Hallstatt (Salzkammergut, Austria), of the Hallstatt culture
- La Tène, Neuchâtel, Switzerland, of the La Tène culture
- Vinča, Belgrade, Serbia, of the Vinča culture
- Abri de la Madeleine (Dordogne, France), of the Magdalenian culture
- Le Moustier (Dordogne, France), of the Mousterian culture
- Saint Acheul (near Amiens, France), of the Acheulean culture
- Butmir (near Sarajevo, Bosnia-Herzegovina), of the Butmir culture
- Cucuteni (Romania) and Trypillia (Ukraine), of the Cucuteni–Trypillia culture

=== Mesoamerica ===
- Uaxactun (Maya civilization, Dept.of Peten, Guatemala)
- Dzibilchaltun (Maya civilization, northern Yucatan, Mexico)
- Monte Albán (Zapotec civilization, Oaxaca, Mexico)

=== Near East ===
- Tell Halaf, Syria, for the Halaf culture
- Tell Hassuna, Iraq, for the Hassuna culture
- Jemdet Nasr, Iraq, for the Jemdet Nasr period
- Tell al-'Ubaid, Iraq, for the Ubaid period
- Uruk, Iraq, for the Uruk period

=== Northern America ===
- Folsom, New Mexico (Folsom Tradition), United States
- Clovis, New Mexico (Clovis culture), United States: generally accepted as the type site for an early human culture in North America
- La Plata County, Colorado (Basketmaker II period of the Anasazi culture), United States
- Barton Gulch of the Blackwater Draw Paleo-Indian culture
- Adena Mound (Adena culture), United States
- Borax Lake Site, for two of the earliest cultural traditions in California: the Post Pattern and Borax Lake Pattern.

=== Oceania ===
- New Caledonia, of the Lapita culture.

=== South Asia ===
- Kot Diji (Pre-Indus civilization, Pakistan)
- Harappa (Indus civilization, Punjab, northeast Pakistan)
