= Cardwell, Montana =

- Census-designated place
- Location of Cardwell, Montana
- Coordinates: 45°51′54″N 111°57′32″W
- Country: United States
- State: Montana
- County: Jefferson

Area
  - Total: 2.15 sq mi (5.58 km^{2})
  - Land: 2.15 sq mi (5.56 km^{2})
  - Water: 0.0077 sq mi (0.02 km^{2})
- Elevation: 4,285 ft (1,306 m)

Population (2020)
  - Total: 62
  - Density: 28.9/sq mi (11.15/km^{2})
- Time zone: UTC-7 (Mountain (MST))
  - Summer (DST): UTC-6 (MDT)
- ZIP code: 59721
- Area code: 406
- FIPS code: 30-12400
- GNIS feature ID: 0780936

Cardwell is a census-designated place (CDP) in Jefferson County, Montana, United States. The population was 62 at the 2020 census. It is part of the Helena Micropolitan Statistical Area.

The town was named for area rancher and state senator Edward Cardwell.

== Geography ==
According to the United States Census Bureau, the Cardwell CDP has a total area of 2.3 square miles (5.9 km^{2}), of which 0.04 square miles (0.1 km^{2}), or 1.86%, are water.

The Jefferson River forms the southern boundary of the community as well as the Madison County line. Cardwell is located at the mouth of Jefferson Canyon, a stretch of the river ending near Willow Creek, Montana. The canyon area has fewer trees and wildlife compared to the rest of the river.

Lewis and Clark Caverns, about 8 miles (13 km) to the east, offer tours during the summer. The caves are home to Townsend's big-eared bats. During the development of the caverns into a state park area, the Civilian Conservations Corps used Cardwell as a base camp.

=== Climate ===
According to the Köppen Climate Classification system, Cardwell has a semi-arid climate, abbreviated "BSk" on climate maps.

Climate data for Cardwell, Montana
Month	Jan	Feb	Mar	Apr	May	Jun	Jul	Aug	Sep	Oct	Nov	Dec	Year
Mean daily maximum °F (°C)	36.3 (2.4)	43.2 (6.2)	48.6 (9.2)	57.6 (14.2)	67.5 (19.7)	77.2 (25.1)	84.7 (29.3)	82.9 (28.3)	72.3 (22.4)	60.4 (15.8)	44.2 (6.8)	36.7 (2.6)	59.3 (15.2)
Daily mean °F (°C)	22.6 (−5.2)	29.5 (−1.4)	34.0 (1.1)	42.3 (5.7)	51.6 (10.9)	60.1 (15.6)	66.2 (19.0)	64.2 (17.9)	53.6 (12.0)	43.5 (6.4)	33.4 (0.8)	26.1 (−3.3)	43.9 (6.6)
Mean daily minimum °F (°C)	13.3 (−10.4)	17.2 (−8.2)	21.9 (−5.6)	27.9 (−2.3)	35.8 (2.1)	43.2 (6.2)	46.4 (8.0)	44.2 (6.8)	35.2 (1.8)	27.9 (−2.3)	19.9 (−6.7)	14.4 (−9.8)	28.9 (−1.7)
Average precipitation inches (mm)	0.4 (10)	0.3 (7)	0.5 (13)	0.9 (23)	1.6 (40)	1.7 (44)	1.3 (32)	1.5 (37)	1.5 (37)	1.1 (28)	0.4 (11)	0.3 (8)	11.5 (290)
Average snowfall inches (cm)	6.9 (17.5)	2.5 (6.3)	4.8 (12.2)	2.2 (5.6)	0.3 (0.8)	0 (0)	0 (0)	0 (0)	0.4 (1.0)	1.1 (2.8)	2.1 (5.3)	3.4 (8.6)	23.7 (60.1)
Average precipitation days (≥ 0)	5	2	6	6	11	9	8	7	8	6	5	4	77
Mean daily daylight hours	9.7	10.9	12.5	14.1	15.6	16.3	15.9	14.6	13	11.4	10	9.3	12.8
Source: Weatherbase

== Demographics ==
Historical population
Census	Pop.	Note	%±
2000	40		—
2010	50		25.0%
2020	62		24.0%
U.S. Decennial Census

As of the census of 2000, there were 40 people, 19 households, and 9 families residing in the CDP. The population density was 17.5 inhabitants per square mile (6.8/km^{2}). There were 19 housing units at an average density of 8.3 per square mile (3.2/km^{2}). The racial makeup of the CDP was 97.50% White, 2.50% from other races. Hispanic or Latino of any race were 2.50% of the population.

There were 19 households, out of which 10.5% had children under the age of 18 living with them, 42.1% were married couples living together, 5.3% had a female householder with no husband present, and 52.6% were non-families. 42.1% of all households were made up of individuals, and 15.8% had someone living alone who was 65 years of age or older. The average household size was 2.11 and the average family size was 2.67.

In the CDP, the population was spread out, with 22.5% under the age of 18, 2.5% from 18 to 24, 27.5% from 25 to 44, 32.5% from 45 to 64, and 15.0% who were 65 years of age or older. The median age was 44 years. For every 100 females, there were 81.8 males. For every 100 females age 18 and over, there were 106.7 males.

The median income for a household in the CDP was $21,250, and the median income for a family was $23,750. Males had a median income of $23,750 versus $0 for females. The per capita income for the CDP was $9,716. There were no families and 9.7% of the population living below the poverty line, including no under eighteens and 60.0% of those over 64.

== Education ==
The school districts for the community are Cardwell Elementary School District and Whitehall High School District The high school district is a part of Whitehall Public Schools.

Grades K-8 attend Cardwell School. In 2022, there were 6 teachers and 34 students at the school.

Grades 9-12 attend Whitehall High School. In 2022, there were 8 teachers and 130 students.

== Media and entertainment ==
Cardwell licenses radio station KEAC-LP, at 106.1 MHz, which is part of the Jefferson County Radio network. It airs classic country music, emergency messages, and public interest items.

Cardwell is home to the annual Headwaters Country Jam music festival.

== Infrastructure ==
Interstate 90 forms the northern edge of the community, with access from Exit 256 (Montana Highway 359). I-90 leads east 52 miles (84 km) to Bozeman and west 33 miles (53 km) to Butte.

Montana Highway 2 parallels I-90 on the northern edge of town.

The nearest airport is Bert Mooney Airport in Butte. Butte also offers the nearest medical care facilities.

== Notable person ==
Prominent American newscaster Chet Huntley was born in Cardwell in 1911.

== See also ==
- List of census-designated places in Montana
