= Jefferson River =

River in Montana, United States

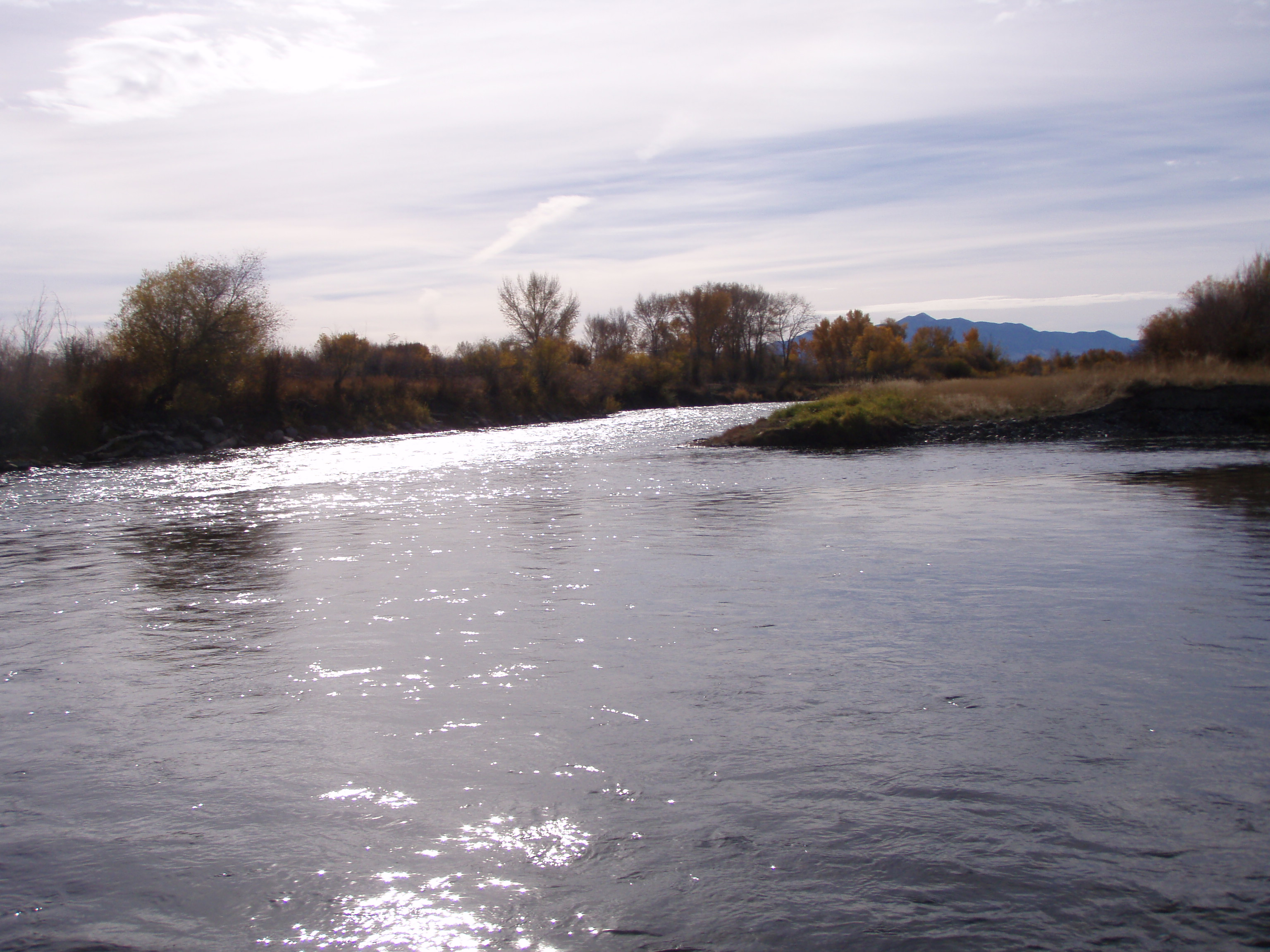
- Confluence of Beaverhead and Big Hole Rivers forming the Jefferson near Twin Bridges, Montana

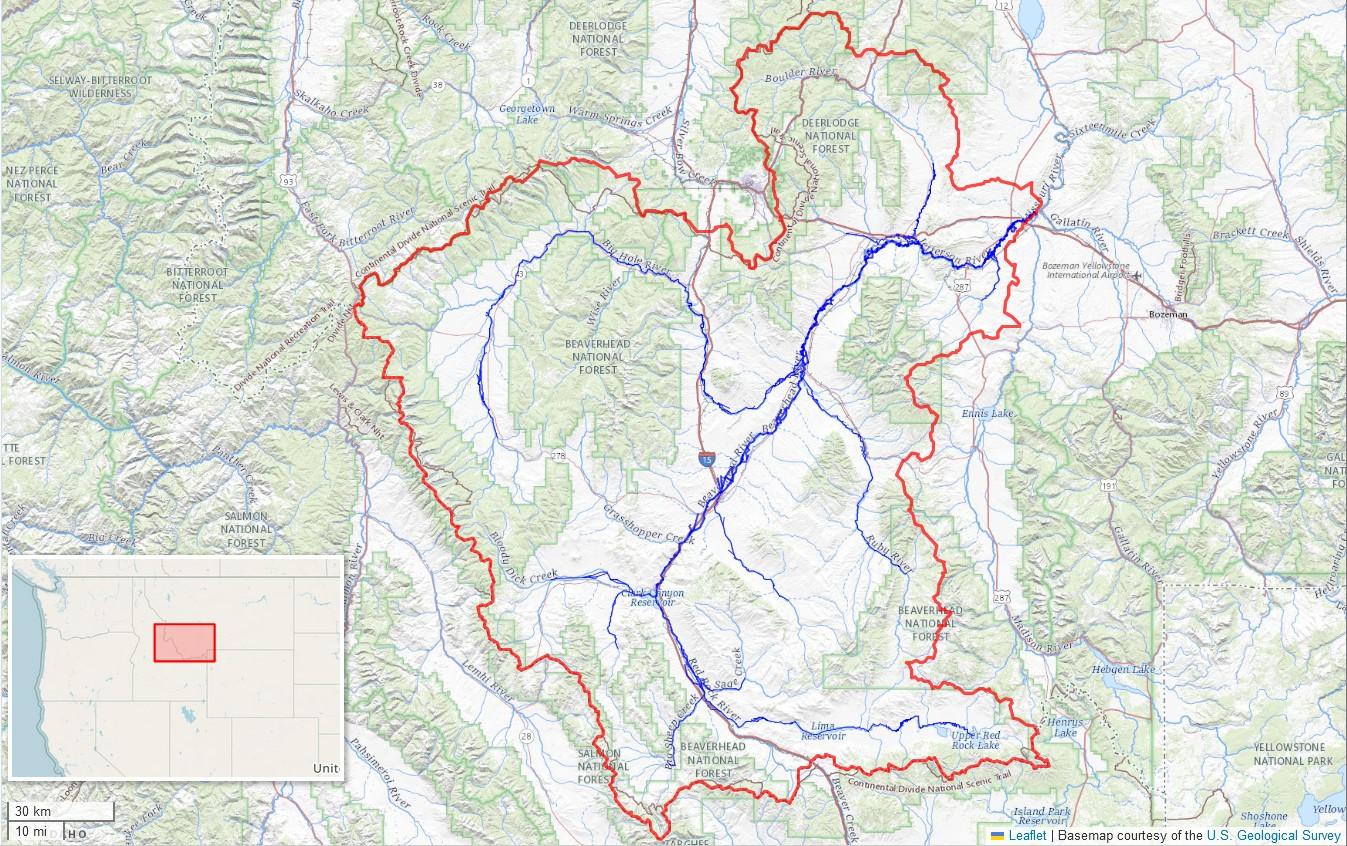
- Jefferson River watershed (Interactive map)

- Location of mouth in MT

Location
- Country: United States
- State: Montana

Physical characteristics
- Source
  - location: Twin Bridges, Montana
  - coordinates: 45°34′05″N 112°20′21″W
- Mouth: Missouri River
  - location: Three Forks, Montana
  - coordinates: 45°55′39″N 111°30′29″W
- Length: 83 mi (134 km)
- Basin size: 9,532 sq mi (24,690 km^{2})
- Discharge
  - location: Three Forks
  - average: 1,928 cu ft/s (54.6 m^{3}/s)
  - minimum: 43 cu ft/s (1.2 m^{3}/s)
  - maximum: 17,000 cu ft/s (480 m^{3}/s)

Basin features
- Tributaries
  - left: Beaverhead River
  - right: Big Hole River, Boulder River (southwestern Montana)

The Jefferson River is a tributary of the Missouri River, approximately 83 miles (134 km) long, in the U.S. state of Montana. The Jefferson River and the Madison River form the official beginning of the Missouri at Missouri Headwaters State Park near Three Forks. It is joined 0.6 miles (1.0 km) downstream (northeast) by the Gallatin.

From broad valleys to a narrow canyon, the Jefferson River passes through a region of significant geological diversity, with some of the oldest and youngest rocks of North America and a diversity of igneous, metamorphic, and sedimentary formations.

The region was only intermittently inhabited by Native Americans until relatively recent times, and no single tribe had exclusive use of the Jefferson River when the Lewis and Clark Expedition first ascended the river in 1805. Today, the Jefferson River retains much of its scenic beauty and wildlife diversity from the days of Lewis and Clark, yet is threatened by water use issues and encroaching development. The Jefferson is a segment of the Lewis and Clark National Historic Trail, administered by the National Park Service.

== Course ==
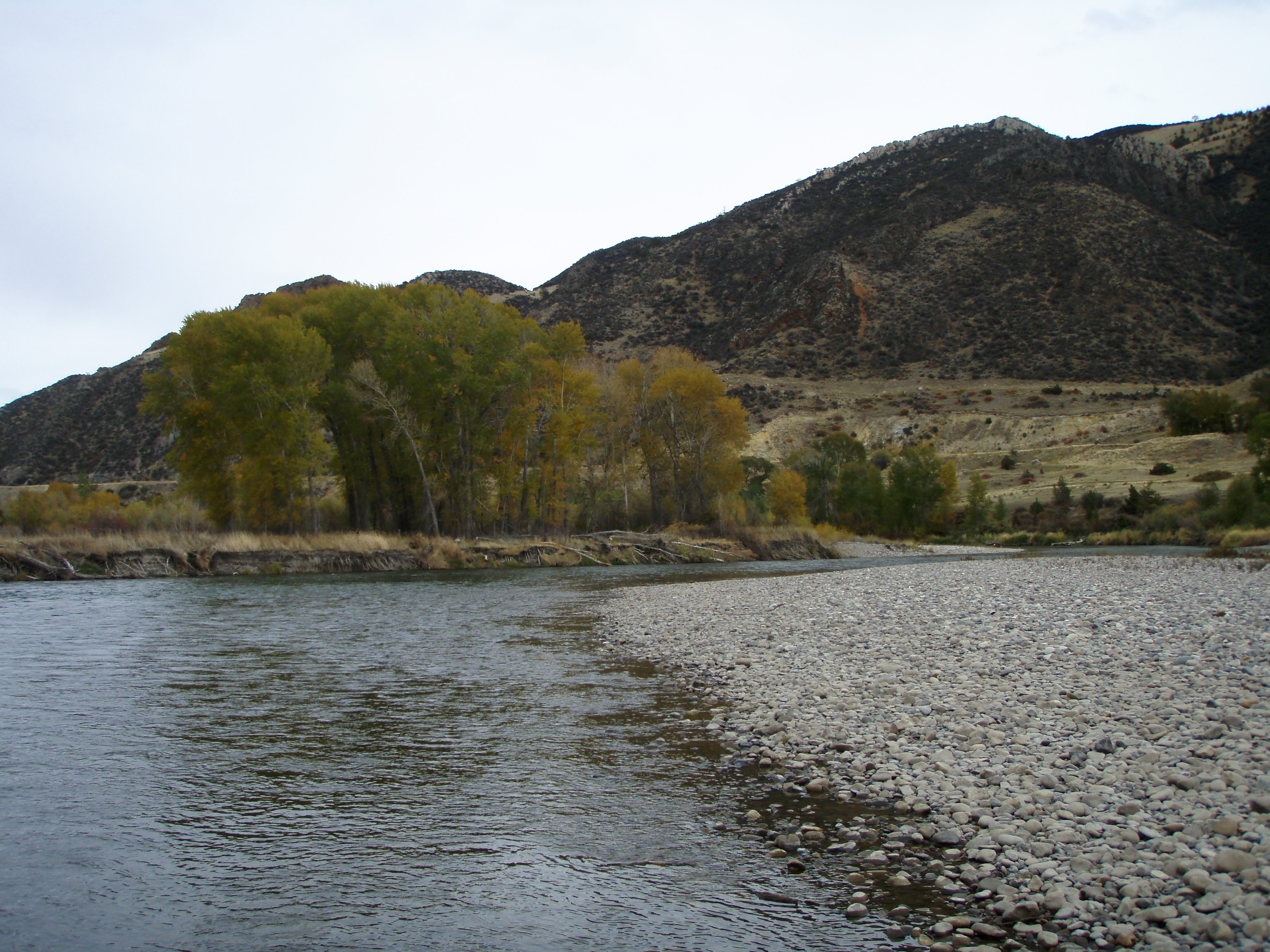
Jefferson River near Parrot Castle, October 2007

From the Rocky Mountains of southwestern Montana, three small rivers converge to form the headwaters of the Jefferson River. The longest begins at Brower's Spring, 9,030 feet (2,750 m) above sea level, on the northern flank of the Centennial Mountains. The site is marked by a pile of rocks. The water flows west then north as Hell Roaring Creek before merging with Rock Creek and flowing west through Upper and Lower Red Rock Lakes. Here it becomes the Red Rock River, flowing west through Lima Reservoir and then northwest into Clark Canyon Reservoir near Dillon. Below the dam, the river is known as the Beaverhead River. It is joined by the Ruby River above the town of Twin Bridges and converges with the Big Hole River to form the Jefferson about two miles downstream from town.

The Jefferson River flows north through the Jefferson Valley towards Whitehall and then east, where it is joined by the Boulder River before passing through the narrow Jefferson River canyon near Lewis and Clark Caverns State Park. After the canyon, the river passes into a broad valley again near Willow Creek. The Jefferson converges with the Madison River at Missouri Headwaters State Park near Three Forks to form the Missouri River, joined a short distance downstream by the Gallatin River.

After flowing into the Missouri, its waters continue into the Mississippi River, eventually into the Gulf of Mexico. These rivers combine to be the fourth longest river on Earth.

== Geology ==
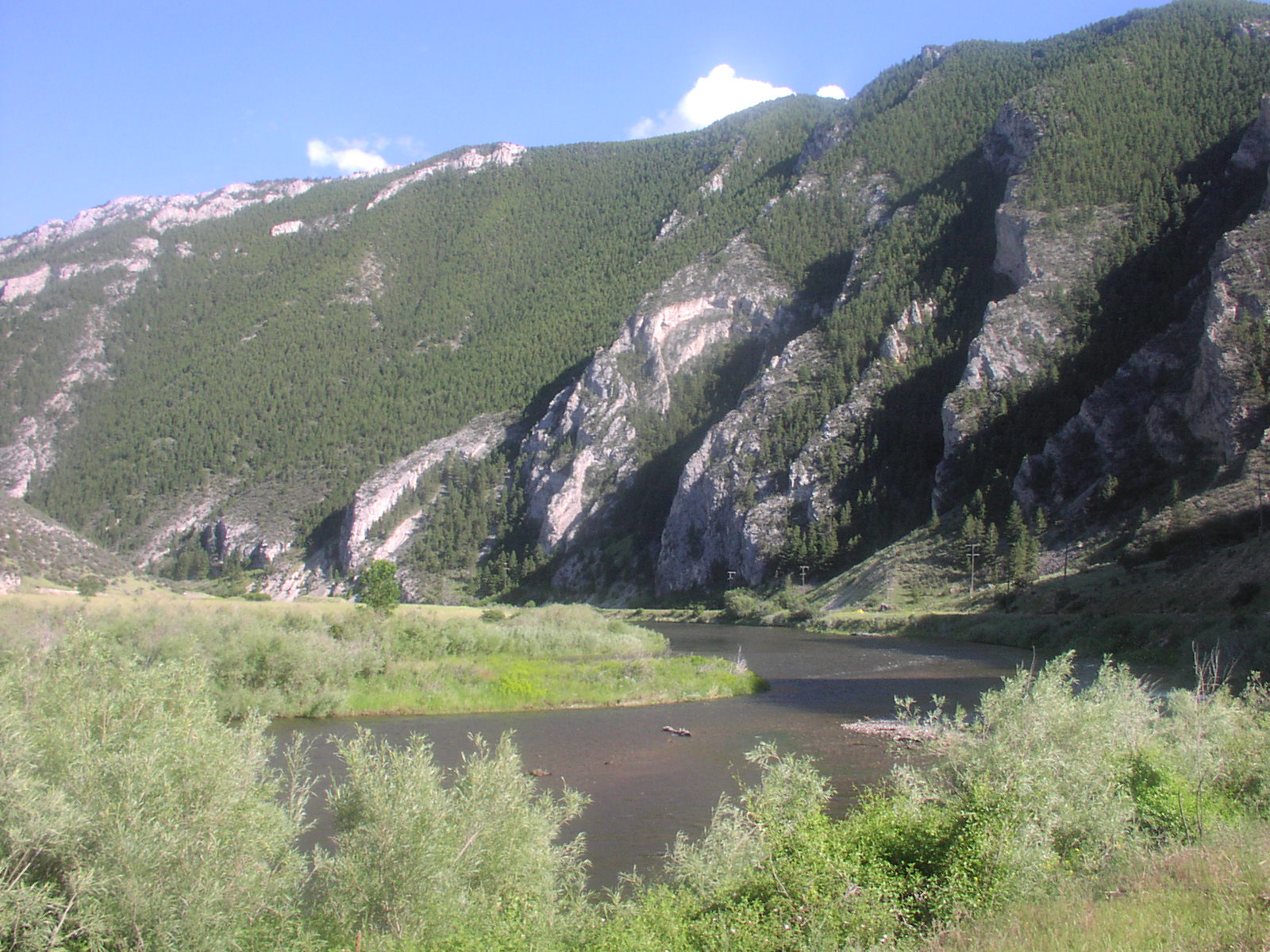
Small marine fossils can be found in the Madison Group limestone that makes up the steep, narrow section of the Jefferson River canyon.

The geology of the Jefferson River and the surrounding mountain ranges includes some of the oldest rocks found in North America, dating back to the Archean Eon, 2.7 billion years ago. Found primarily in the Tobacco Root and Ruby ranges, these ancient rocks are metamorphic, having been highly compressed and nearly re-melted by geologic forces over eons of time. Frequently found along the Jefferson River, these rocks include layered feldspars, gneiss, glassy quartz, heavy dark amphibolite, and sometimes marble.

About a billion years ago, the Willow Creek Fault, north of the Jefferson River canyon, dropped down deeply and filled with seawater, stretching north to Alberta and British Columbia. Eventually, the sea receded and erosion wore away intervening geologic history until about 530 million years ago, during the Cambrian Period of the Paleozoic Era.

A new sea encroached on the land, depositing sedimentary layers of limestone, dolomite, shale, and sandstone over several hundred million years. Limestone is generally made of calcium from marine animals that have been compacted and cemented together. Dolomite is similar but has more magnesium. Shale is formed from fine-grained mud, silts, and clays that have been compacted and cemented together. The sandstone is made up of quartz and feldspar.

By the Mississippian Period, 340 million years ago, much of western North America was covered with a warm, shallow sea, much like the Gulf Coast of Florida today. Small marine fossils can be found in the Madison Group limestone that makes up the steep, narrow section of the Jefferson River canyon today.

Gentle uplift eventually raised the region above sea level again. Rainwater percolated down through cracks in the limestone, dissolving rock and creating caves such as those found at Lewis and Clark Caverns State Park.

Local mountains, such as the Tobacco Roots were formed from the Boulder Batholith. The batholith is composed of at least seven, and possibly as many as fourteen, discrete igneous rock masses called plutons, which formed beneath the Earth's surface during a period of magma intrusion about 73 to 78 million years ago during the Late Cretaceous. The rising buoyant plutons resulted from subduction along what was then the west coast of North America. Regional uplift brought the deep-seated granite to the surface, where erosion exposed the rocks and the mineral veins they contained. The granite generally consists of quartz, hornblende, and feldspars. Gold, silver, and other semi precious minerals are also associated with batholiths.

The ancient metamorphic and more recent sedimentary layers above the batholiths eroded away as the magma pushed up through the crust. Thus, the granite batholiths are typically found at the center of local mountain ranges, while the much older metamorphic gneiss is usually found lower in the mountains, and limestone layers are mostly found in the foothills nearest the Jefferson River.

The Rocky Mountains began a new and continuing phase of crustal stress 5 to 10 million years ago as tectonic forces began to pull the region apart. Blocks of earth dropped down to form valleys, and the Jefferson River eroded a channel through rock to form the Jefferson River canyon.

== First peoples ==
Archaeologists believe that the first Americans migrated across the Bering land bridge from Asia between 12,000 and 30,000 years ago. They followed the Great North Trail, which dipped down into Montana along the east slope of the Rocky Mountains. These Paleo-Indians or Clovis people hunted the now-extinct mammoths and bison with Clovis points. Clovis points dated 12,000 to 13,000 years old have been found along the Missouri River near Townsend, Montana, about forty-five miles beyond the Jefferson. Paleo-Indians seldom entered the Rockies, where glaciation persisted.

Upstream from the Jefferson, at Barton Gulch, a tributary of the Ruby-Jefferson River system, archaeologists excavated an extensive complex of Paleo-Indian cooking pits and earth ovens dated to 9400 RCYBP.

Between 6,000 and 7,000 years ago, climate change brought dramatically drier conditions to the Northern Rockies. It is thought that far fewer animals survived in the region and the native peoples likely migrated elsewhere. Montana was apparently only intermittently inhabited after that until relatively recent times.

In the 1500s, the Kootenai came into Montana from the north. The Salish and Pend d'Oreille migrated in from the north and northwest, venturing south to the Jefferson River/Missouri Headwaters and eastward. Major population shifts started in the early 1600s, bringing several new tribes into Montana. With horses of Spanish origin, the Shoshone migrated into Montana from the Great Basin and hunted buffalo, becoming the dominant tribe in the area. However, the arrival and expansion of European settlers on the east coast pushed Native Americans west, in a domino effect that extended all the way into Montana. The Crow migrated into Montana from the east in the 1600s, followed by the Blackfeet, Gros Ventre, and Assiniboine in the 1700s. With the acquisition of guns and horses, the Blackfeet became the dominant tribe on the plains in the 1700s. The Shoshone were largely pushed back over the continental divide into Idaho, but still ventured into Montana hunting and foraging. By 1800, the Missouri headwaters and much of southwest Montana was a crossroads frequented by the Lemhi Shoshone, Bannock, Nez Perce, Flathead, Crow, Sioux, and Piegan Blackfeet.

Sacagawea, of the Lemhi Shoshone, was captured by the Hidatsa on the lower Jefferson River in 1800, when she was about twelve years old. She was later married to Toussaint Charbonneau and both of them joined the Lewis and Clark Expedition when Lewis and Clark wintered with the Hidatsa in North Dakota in 1804–05.

== Lewis and Clark Expedition ==
Little was known about the American West at the beginning of the nineteenth century. The Missouri River flowed southeast from an unknown source, joining the Mississippi River before flowing south to the Gulf of Mexico. The Columbia River originated at a similar latitude as the Missouri, and flowed west to the Pacific Ocean. What lay in between was the subject of much speculation.

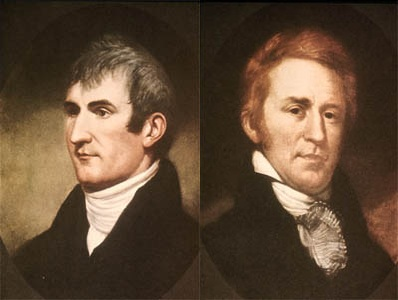
Lewis and Clark ascended the Jefferson River in 1805 in their search for a navigable water route to the Pacific.

The United States acquired the Missouri River watershed through the Louisiana Purchase of 1803, and President Thomas Jefferson sent Meriwether Lewis and William Clark with a company of men to explore up the Missouri in the hopes of finding a navigable water route to the Pacific, with a low portage connecting one watershed with the other. The Expedition departed from Saint Louis, Missouri in the spring of 1804, ascended the Missouri River that summer, then wintered over with the Hidatsa Indians in North Dakota, where they met Toussaint Charbonneau and his Shoshone wife Sacagawea. Lewis and Clark hired Charbonneau to join the expedition, in part because Sacagawea's people were native to the Missouri headwaters. The Lewis and Clark Expedition arrived at the Missouri Headwaters on 27 July 1805.

Of the three streams that make up the headwaters of the Missouri, the eastern fork is the smallest, while the larger middle and western forks are of relatively equal size. Therefore, Lewis and Clark concluded that it would be inappropriate for any fork to retain the name "Missouri." Instead, they named the western fork the Jefferson, the middle fork as the Madison, and the eastern fork as the Gallatin, as Meriwether Lewis noted in his journal on July 28, 1805:

"Both Capt. C. and myself corrisponded in opinion with rispect to the impropriety of calling either of these [three] streams the Missouri and accordingly agreed to name them after the President of the United States and the Secretaries of the Treasury and state..."

The expedition rested a couple days at the Missouri headwaters, then began to ascend the Jefferson River, using ropes to pull the dugout canoes upstream against the current. Along the way they hunted deer, elk, bighorn sheep, and encountered grizzly bears. Describing the upper Jefferson River, Lewis recorded on August 2, 1805:

The valley though which our rout of this [day] lay and through which the river winds it's meandering course is a beatifull level plain with but little timber and that on the verge of the river. the land is tolerably fertile, consisting of a black or dark yellow loam, and covered with grass from 9 Inches to 2 feet high. The plain ascends gradually on either side of the river to the bases of two ranges of mountains which ly parallel to the river and which terminate 〈it's〉 the width of the vally. the tops of these mountains were yet partially covered with snow while we in the valley. were suffocated nearly with the intense heat of the midday sun. the nights are so could that two blankets are not more than sufficient covering.

Arriving at a major confluence, Lewis and Clark named the western fork the Wisdom River, the eastern fork the Philanthropy River and retained the middle fork as a continuation of the Jefferson River. However, none of these names were retained. These rivers are known today as the Big Hole, the Ruby, and the Beaverhead.

The Jefferson River is a segment of the Lewis and Clark National Historic Trail, established by Congress in 1978 and administered by the National Park Service.

== Recreation ==
The Jefferson River is rated as Class I water for recreational purposes from its origin at the Beaverhead and Big Hole rivers to its confluence with the Missouri at Three Forks. The river is suitable for floaters and beginning paddlers, except during high water flows in the spring. Possible hazards include downed trees, called "sweeps" and diversion dams constructed to channel river water into irrigation ditches. Water levels often drop off by mid-summer, making it necessary to drag watercraft over shallow riffles.

The Jefferson River consists of three distinct sections.

The upper Jefferson is a much-braided, meandering river and floodplain system that supports productive farm fields, extensive cottonwood groves, rich meadows, and abundant wildlife. The river creates diverse habitats as it naturally shifts back and forth across the Jefferson Valley, forming oxbows and swamps of various depth and age. Shifting channels and natural flooding facilitates the germination of cottonwood seedlings. Individual cottonwood groves are often germinated from a single flood event and tend to be of uniform age. The upper Jefferson extends from the confluence of the Big Hole and the Beaverhead rivers approximately 44 miles downstream to the community of Cardwell.

The middle Jefferson enters a narrow canyon a short distance downstream from Cardwell and is largely contained by the geography for most of the next 15 miles downstream to Sappington Bridge. Lacking the ability to flood or meander, this section of the river has few trees, swamps, meadows, and significantly less wildlife than the upper Jefferson.

The lower Jefferson opens up again into a meandering, braided river from Sappington bridge approximately 24 miles downstream to its confluence with the Madison River. Here, the riparian zone again supports an extensive community of swamps, meadows, cottonwood groves, and productive farm lands.

=== Jefferson River Canoe Trail ===
The Jefferson River Canoe Trail is a non-motorized water trail that follows the course of the Jefferson River in southwest Montana, extending from its origin at the confluence of the Beaverhead and Big Hole rivers near Twin Bridges to its junction with the Madison and Gallatin rivers at Missouri Headwaters State Park near Three Forks. The water trail forms a dedicated recreational segment of the Lewis and Clark National Historic Trail, highlighting the route taken by the Lewis and Clark Expedition as they traveled upstream in dugout canoes during the summer of 1805.

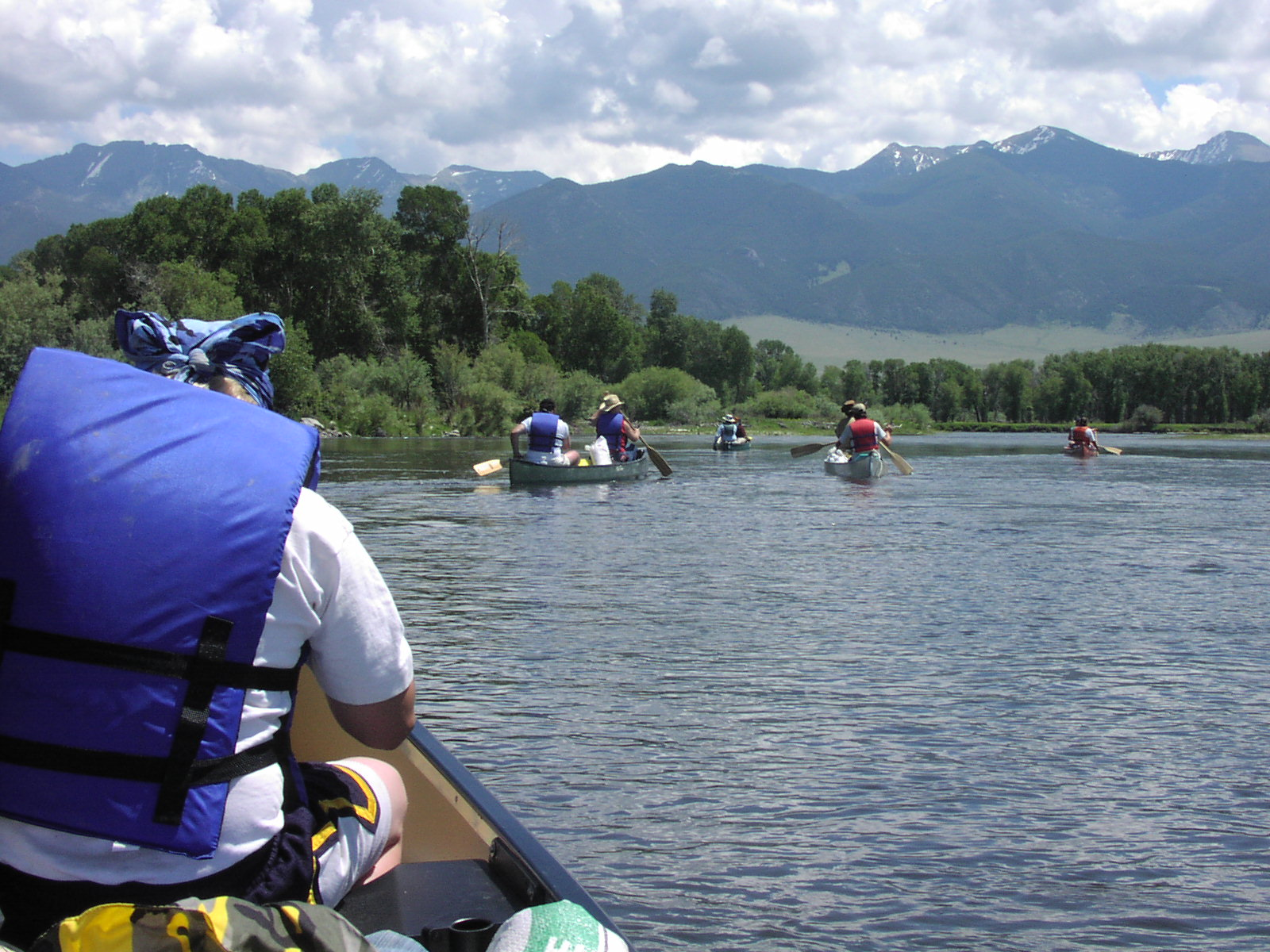
Canoeing the Jefferson River Canoe Trail.

The trail is rated primarily as Class I water, making it accessible to novice paddlers, canoeists, and kayak enthusiasts outside of peak spring runoff periods. Floating through agricultural valleys, high-desert cottonwood bottomlands, and geological formations such as Jefferson River Canyon, paddlers encounter wildlife habitat supporting bald eagles, nesting waterfowl, and big game species.

The waterway is managed through a cooperative effort involving public land agencies, local volunteer stewards, and the Jefferson River Chapter of the Lewis and Clark Trail Heritage Foundation. To accommodate multi-day trips while mitigating trespassing on adjacent private agricultural lands, the trail features a network of public fishing access sites (FAS), Bureau of Land Management (BLM) parcels, and designated primitive campsites acquired by conservation groups. Camping along the corridor strictly adheres to Leave No Trace backcountry principles and Montana's Stream Access Law, which permits public recreation up to the ordinary high-water mark.

== Environmental Degradation ==
Throughout its length, the Jefferson River is used extensively as a source of irrigation water for local farms and ranches. Dams constructed upstream on the Ruby and Beaverhead rivers store surplus water from spring runoff which is released to augment natural flows during the summer irrigation season. However, portions of the river can become severely dewatered, shallow, and warm in drought years, adversely impacting fish populations. The unnaturally warm water, combined with excess nutrients from irrigation runoff and grazing practices, can stimulate rapid growth of algae in mid-summer, to the detriment of anglers and floaters.

On August 5, 2016, the Jefferson River stream flow was measured at only 19 CFS (cubic feet per second). This occurred even while the three main tributaries to the Jefferson were contributing 1140 CFS. The Ruby River was measured at 310 CFS, the Big Hole River was measured at 200 CFS and the Beaverhead River was measured at 630 CFS. Irrigators took over 98% of this stream flow by forcing the river into irrigation channels using diversion dams, leaving less than 2% of water in the river. Montana has no minimum stream flow legislation to prevent the total dewatering of the Jefferson River in the future.

While much of the Jefferson River remains untouched and scenic, it is threatened by new housing developments that incrementally fragment wildlife habitat and vistas along the river. Efforts to stabilize portions of the riverbank with rock, concrete, and other rip-rap materials have inhibited the river's ability to flood, meander, and form new cottonwood groves and wildlife habitat. In addition, rip-rapped sections of the river tend to funnel floodwaters downstream, increasing the impact to other landowners.

== See also ==
- Montana Stream Access Law
- List of rivers of Montana
