= Lewis and Clark Caverns =

State park in Montana, United States

Lewis and Clark Caverns State Park
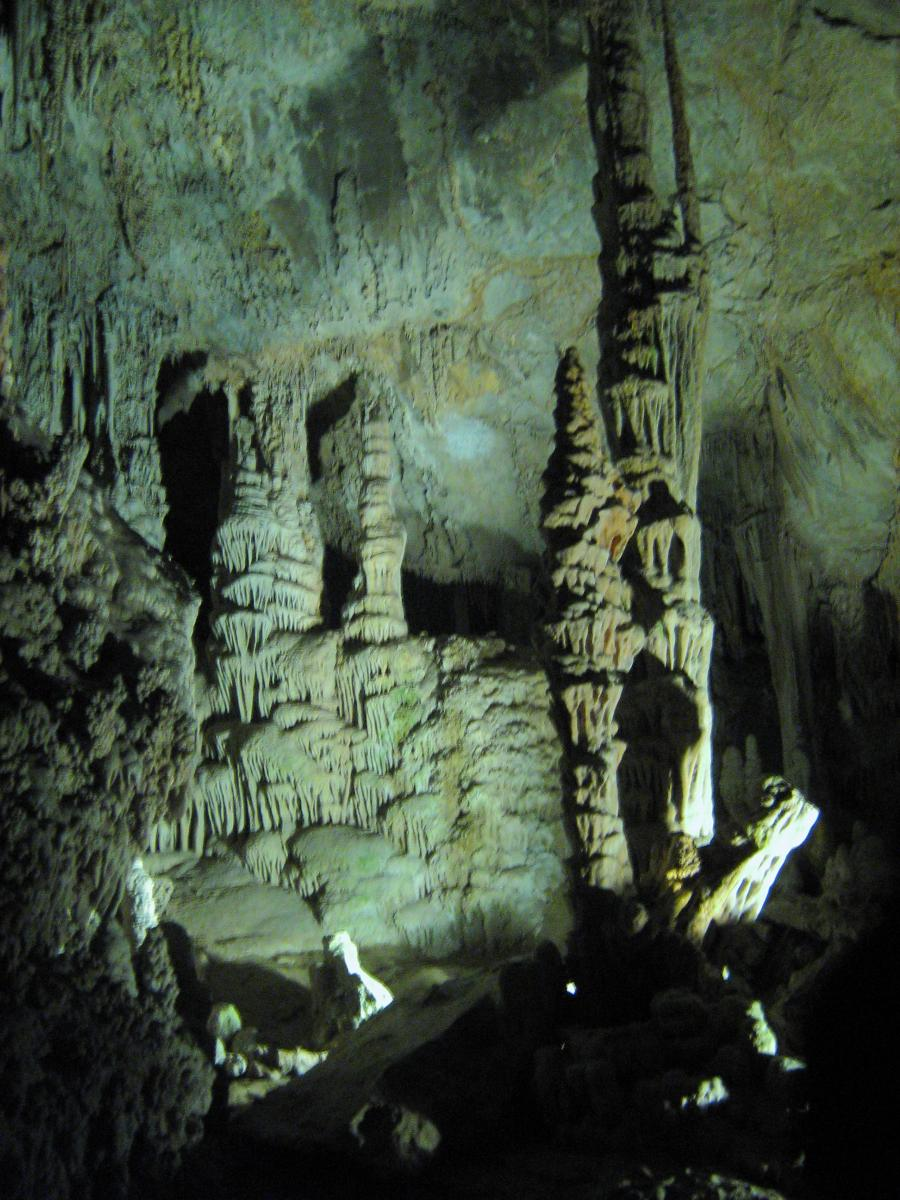
- Illuminated interior of Lewis and Clark Caverns

- Location within Montana
- Location: Jefferson County, Montana, United States
- Nearest town: Whitehall, Montana
- Coordinates: 45°50′21″N 111°53′12″W
- Area: 3,015 acres (1,220 ha)
- Elevation: 4,921 ft (1,500 m)
- Designation: Montana state park
- Established: 1935
- Visitors: 46,893 (in 2023)
- Administrator: Montana Fish, Wildlife & Parks
- Website: Lewis and Clark Caverns State Park

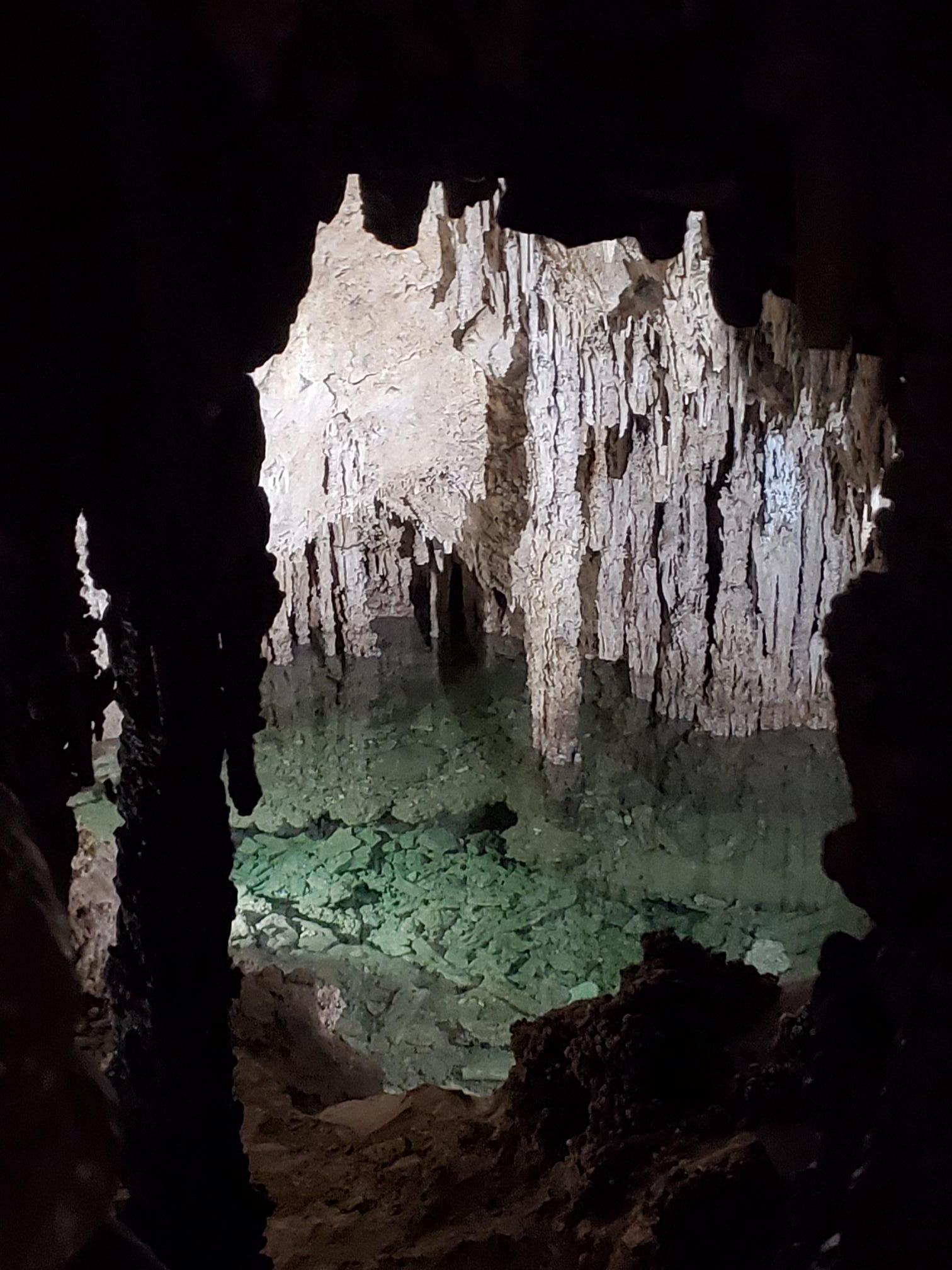
One of the natural pools of water in the Lewis and Clark Caverns turned green from human interaction

Lewis and Clark Caverns State Park is a 3,000-acre (1,200 ha) public recreation and nature preservation area located twelve miles (19 km) east of Whitehall in Jefferson County, Montana. The state park includes two visitor centers, ten miles of hiking trails, a campground, and its namesake limestone caverns. The Lewis and Clark Caverns Historic District was placed on the National Register of Historic Places in 2018.

== History ==
The caverns may have been familiar to Native Americans since long before their discovery by Europeans, though there has been no documented evidence of human presence in the cave before the late 1800s. The Lewis and Clark Expedition camped within sight of the caverns on July 31, 1805, when they camped along Antelope Creek. In 1892, local ranchers Tom Williams and Bert (or Burt) Pannel saw steam coming from the caverns while hunting. Following the discovery, two people from Whitehall, Montana, Charles Brooke and Mexican John claimed that they had discovered the cavern in 1882. However, their claims are unsubstantiated. In 1898, Williams finally explored the caverns with some friends.

The cave was first developed for tours around 1900 by Dan A. Morrison, who called it Limespur Cave. He filed a mineral claim on the land in 1905, but the Northern Pacific Railroad disputed that claim and filed a court case against him. The railroad won the court battle and then handed the land over to the federal government. The site was first officially established as "Lewis and Clark Cavern National Monument" on May 11, 1908, but was not fully surveyed and declared until May 16, 1911, by President Taft as 160 acres (0.65 km^{2}). The limestone cave is named after the explorers Meriwether Lewis and William Clark since the cavern overlooks over 50 miles (80 km) of the trail from the Lewis and Clark Expedition along the Jefferson River, although Lewis and Clark never saw the cavern. Lewis and Clark did, however, pass through portions of the modern-day park. It is located approximately 45 miles (72 km) west of Bozeman, Montana, and 60 miles (97 km) northwest from the northwest corner of Yellowstone National Park. The caverns are also notable in that much of the work done to make the cave system accessible to tourists was performed by the New Deal-era Civilian Conservation Corps.

It was disbanded as a national monument on August 24, 1937, because the National Park Service determined the caverns lacked the required national significance. Ownership of the site was transferred to the state of Montana, and on April 22, 1938, Morrison Cave was declared Montana's first state park. The site was formally dedicated in May 1941. The park was listed on the National Register of Historic Places in 2018.

== Geology ==
Lewis and Clark Caverns was dissolved by slightly acidic groundwater in tilted beds of the Madison Limestone of Mississippian age. This limestone was formed by layers of calcium-rich organisms that died in a sea that was present around 325 and 365 million years ago. Reddish sandstone, known as the Amsden, laid down in the Pennsylvanian age was uplifted to current heights during the Laramide Orogeny around 70 million years ago. This uplift constructed joints in the Madison Limestone that would later become caves, such as the Lewis and Clark Caverns. Most of the cave was probably excavated during the ice ages, a time of much greater water supply than today.

== Townsend's big-eared bats ==
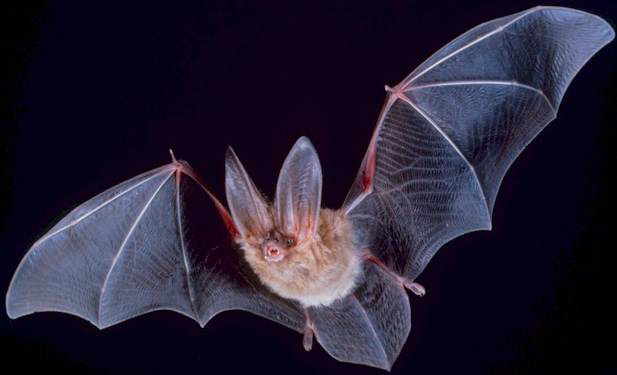
Townsend's big-eared bat

There used to be hundreds of western big-eared bats in the caverns, but now there are only about 50 to 150 females that roost inside the caverns each year to have their pups. The males are believed to live in other caves nearby. These bats eat thousands of insects every day. Bats have opposable thumbs and are "the only mammals capable of true flight." The year 2012 was declared the "Year of the Bat" at the caverns, with a special celebration from August 7–11. Bat week in August continues annually at the park, with bat programs offered each day during that time. Bat guano was collected by the Civilian Conservation Corps during World War II and used to make TNT. There are also springtails found in the caves.

== Activities and amenities ==
The park is open year-round with the caverns open by guided tour only from May through September. There are two tour options: the Classic Cave Tour is 2 miles (3.2 km) in distance and lasts two hours, the Paradise Tour is one mile and about an hour long. Park activities and amenities include amphitheatre, bicycling, bird watching, camping, restrooms, camper dump station, fire rings, fishing, hiking, mountain biking, kennels, kiosk and information station, cabins, parking, photography, picnicking with tables, playgrounds, retail firewood, ice, trails, freshwater, and wildlife.
