= Greenhorn Range =

Mountain range in Montana, United States

- Location within Montana

Highest point
- Elevation: 8,622 ft (2,628 m)
- Coordinates: 45°06′32″N 111°58′05″W

Geography
- Country: United States
- State: Montana

The Greenhorn Range, el. 8,622 feet (2,628 m), is a small mountain range south of Virginia City, Montana in Madison County, Montana.

== See also ==
- List of mountain ranges in Montana
