= Madison Group =

Geologic formation in the western United States

Madison Limestone
- Stratigraphic range: Mississippian
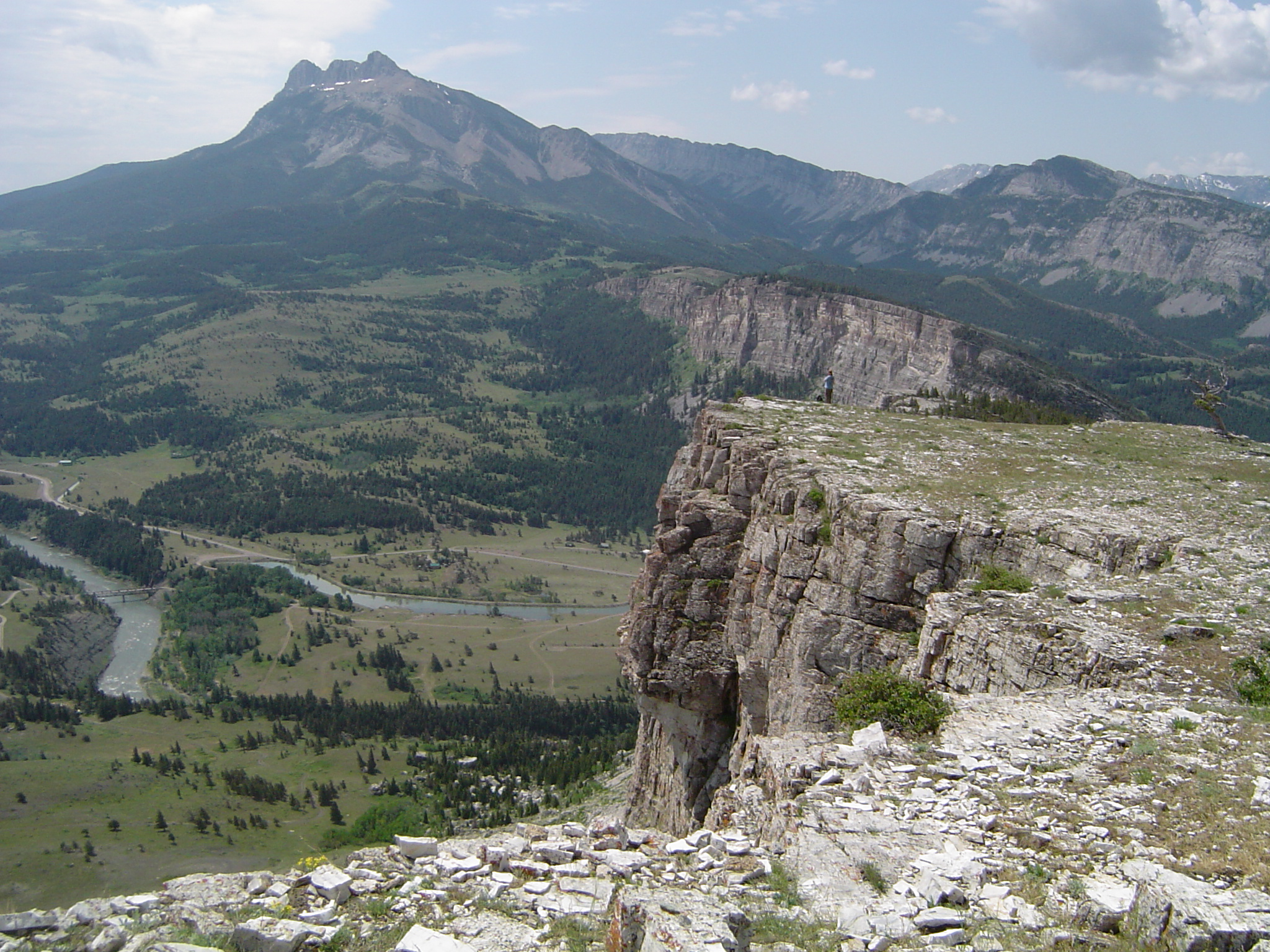
- Thrust segment of the Madison Limestone, Sun River canyon, Montana
- Type: Geological formation
- Underlies: Big Snowy Group
- Overlies: Bakken Formation (Three Forks Group)
- Thickness: up to 2,100 feet (640 m)

Lithology
- Primary: Limestone
- Other: Shale

Location
- Region: South Dakota, Montana, Idaho, Colorado, Arizona, Alberta, Saskatchewan, Manitoba, Utah
- Country: United States, Canada

Type section
- Named for: Madison Range
- Named by: A.C. Peale, 1893

The Madison Limestone is a thick sequence of mostly carbonate rocks of Mississippian age in the Rocky Mountain and Great Plains areas of the western United States. The rocks serve as an important aquifer as well as an oil reservoir in places. The Madison and its equivalent strata extend from the Black Hills of western South Dakota to western Montana and eastern Idaho, and from the Canada–United States border to western Colorado and the Grand Canyon of Arizona.

== Age and nomenclature ==
The Madison is formally known as the Madison Group. In Montana, where its thickness reaches 1,700 feet (520 m), the group is subdivided into the Mission Canyon Formation and Lodgepole Formation. Equivalents of the Madison are named the Pahasapa Limestone in the Black Hills, Leadville Limestone (Colorado), Guernsey Limestone (Wyoming), and Redwall Limestone in the Grand Canyon. The upper part of the Madison Group, the Charles Formation in the subsurface of North Dakota and northern Montana, is not strictly an equivalent of the Madison Limestone as usually defined.

Most of the Madison Limestones were deposited during Early to Middle Mississippian time (Tournaisian to Visean stages), about 359 to 326 million years ago. Older North American usage lists the Madison as being laid down during the Kinderhookian, Osagian, and Meramecian stages.

Neither a type locality nor derivation of the name was designated when the term Madison Limestone was first used by Peale (1893), but since the original work focused on the area of Three Forks, Montana, it is likely that the name relates to outcrops along the Madison River, Montana. A reference section has been designated on the north side of Gibson Reservoir in SE/4 sec. 36, T. 22 N., R. 10 W., Patricks Basin quad, Teton Co., Montana.

== Lithology ==
Limestones and dolomites dominate the Madison. Because the rock is highly soluble, it often develops caves and karst topography. Lewis and Clark Caverns, Montana, is an example of a cave developed in the Madison. The rocks were deposited in a generally shallow marine setting, indicated by the richly fossiliferous rocks of the Madison. In the Williston Basin, water was shallow enough for oolite shoals to develop; they later became reservoirs for oil. The gray cliffs along the Missouri River in the Gates of the Mountains, Montana are formed by Madison Limestone.

== Subdivisions ==
Montana-Wyoming-Manitoba

The following formations are recognized in Montana, Wyoming and Manitoba, from top to base:

Sub-unit	Age	Lithology	Max. thickness	Reference
Charles Formation	Mississippian	dolomitic limestone	244 m (800 ft)	
Mission Canyon Formation	Osagian	white bioclastic limestone, oolitic calcarenite, occasionally dolomitized; anhydrite in the Williston Basin	183 m (600 ft)	
Lodgepole Formation	Kinderhookian	lime mudstones, shale, chert, contains bitumen	245 m (800 ft)	

Saskatchewan

The following subdivisions (of formation rank) are recognized in Saskatchewan, from top to base:

Sub-unit	Age	Lithology	Max. thickness	Reference
Poplar Beds	Meramecian	limestone, argillaceous dolomite, evaporite	152 m (500 ft)	
Ratcliffe Beds	Osagian	dense dolomite, mudstone with three anhydrite beds	80 m (260 ft)	
Midale Beds	Osagian	oolitic to pisolitic and skeletal grainstone to packstone with vuggy porosity, dolomite, porous wackestone	45 m (150 ft)	
Frobisher Evaporite	Osagian	supratidal anhydrite	9 m (30 ft)	
Kisbey Sandstone	Osagian	porous silty dolomite and calcareous sandstone	10 m (30 ft)	
Alida Beds	Osagian	oolitic to pisolitic grainstone and packstone, silty and dolomitic limestone, crinoidal limestones	63 m (210 ft)	
Tilston Beds	Kinderhookian	oolitic, pisolitic and crinoidal grainstone and packstone; cherty or dolomitic limestone, silty limestone, anhydrite	80 m (260 ft)	
Souris Valley Beds	Kinderhookian	argillaceous limestone, calcareous shale, chert	176 m (580 ft)	

== See also ==
- List of types of limestone
