= Tobacco Root Mountains =

Mountain in the state of Montana

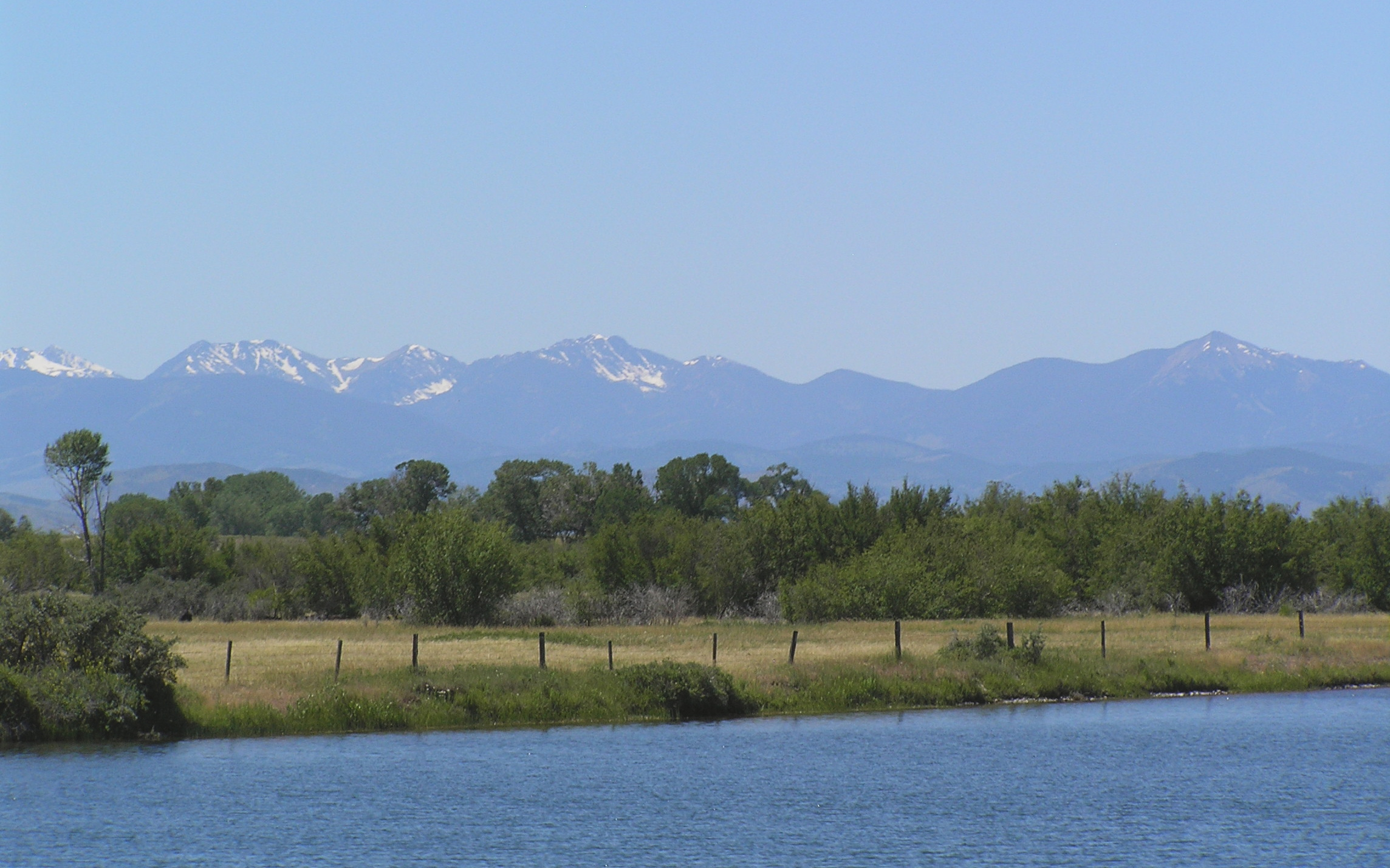
- Panoramic view of Tobacco Roots

Highest point
- Peak: Hollowtop Peak
- Elevation: 10,604 ft (3,232 m)

Geography
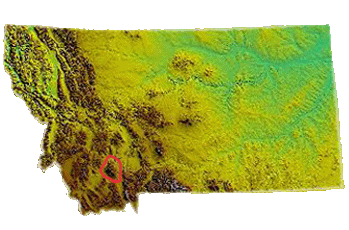
- Country: United States
- State: Montana
- Range coordinates: 45°33.3′N 111°58.5′W
- Parent range: Rocky Mountains

The Tobacco Root Mountains lie in the northern Rocky Mountains, between the Jefferson and Madison Rivers in southwest Montana. The highest peak is Hollowtop at 10,604 feet (3,232 m). The range contains 43 peaks rising to elevations greater than 10,000 feet (3048 m).

Much of the central part of the range is within the Beaverhead-Deerlodge National Forest, although many—mostly small—patented mining claims exist within the forest boundary. The range saw significant gold mining, especially during the 1880s to 1930s.

The high peaks have been extensively glaciated, and most of the larger stream valleys held valley glaciers during the ice age.

== Discovery and nomenclature ==
When Lewis and Clark came through southwest Montana in 1805, they named many rivers — but if they referred to the mountain ranges by name, the names are not recorded. The 1865 DeLacey Map of Montana Territory does not name the Tobacco Roots. The first written reference to the mountains between the Madison and Jefferson Rivers is F.V. Hayden's 6th Annual Report of the Geological Surveys of the Territories for 1873, in which the name South Bowlder Range is mentioned, a reference to the largest river in the north part of the mountains. Although this usage (usually spelled "South Boulder Range") is followed in many Geographies and Atlases of the 1890s and early 1900s, the USGS Three Forks Folio labels the mountains "Jefferson Range."

The earliest known use in print of the name Tobacco Root Mountains is Winchell's (1914) report on mining districts of the Dillon Quad. The name was also used by Billingsley in a 1918 paper on the Boulder Batholith, published by the American Institute of Mining Engineers. "Tobacco Root" appears in most subsequent publications, including Montana Bureau of Mines and Geology reports (at least since 1933), National Forest Maps (since 1938), and the Official Montana Highway Maps.

A map in Fenneman's Physiography of Western United States (1931) shows a long Jefferson Range to include what is now called the Tobacco Roots plus the Gravelly Range. Oil Company highway maps from the late 1960s and early 1970s show "Tobacco Root Mountains" in the north, and "Jefferson Range" in the south (northwest of Ennis and north of Virginia City). Preliminary topographic maps of the area (Bureau of Reclamation, Missouri Basin Project) from 1947 to 1948 show Jefferson Range, but on the 1950 15-minute sheet (Harrison Quad) the identical topography is labeled "Tobacco Root Mountains" in the same place as "Jefferson Range" on the maps that were just two years older.

The 1947 Bozeman 1:250,000 shaded relief map has Jefferson Range, but the 1958 (Bozeman 1:250,000) and 1962 (Dillon) regular editions use Tobacco Root Mountains.

== Origin of name ==
Curly Lake in the Tobacco Root Mountains

The basis for the name Tobacco Root is unclear. John Willard says "Indians and early trappers found a root in these mountains that, when dried and mixed with larb(?), made a suitable substitute for real tobacco. The root was a species of mullein."

The term "tobacco root" is also an old name for species of arnica; native and European-introduced arnica are wildflowers in Western Montana, including the Tobacco Root Mountains.

Tansley, Shaffer and Hart (1933) attribute the practice of drying a species of mullein and mixing it with kinnikinic (bearberry) to replace tobacco to John Edwards, a prospector from Flint Creek, in the 1860s. He also gave the name to the hills in which the root was found. Kinnikinic, as the name of a mixture and not the bearberry plant, was a leaf-bark mixture, including sumac and dogwood leaves, smoked by Indians and pioneers in the Ohio Valley in the 18th century. It was probably more or less the same as the "larb" mentioned above.

Other sources have reported the root to be a variety of the bitterroot, Montana's protected state flower. Shoshone Indians reportedly cooked the root and ate it, and it supposedly smelled like tobacco.

== Geology ==
The center of the range is occupied by the Tobacco Root Batholith, thought to be a satellite pluton of the Boulder Batholith. This Late Cretaceous granitic body intrudes Archean gneisses and schists. Significant gold deposits appear to be related to the intrusion of the Tobacco Root Batholith and northwest-trending faults in the Pony area and elsewhere. The northern flank of the Tobacco Roots consists of thrusted and folded sedimentary and volcaniclastic rocks ranging from Proterozoic Belt Supergroup strata to Cretaceous Elkhorn Mountains Volcanics. Thick sections of Paleozoic and Mesozoic strata, including the Flathead Sandstone and Madison Limestone, are present.

== Land characteristics and habitats ==
The land is used mostly in livestock grazing and logging. Land stewardship in the North Tobacco Root Mountains and Foothills area is U.S. Federal Agencies at 32,309 acres (130.75 km^{2}) (14.4%), which include BLM at 17,544 acres (71.00 km^{2}) (7.8%), USFS at 14,765 acres (59.75 km^{2}) (6.6%), State agencies at 20,695 acres (83.75 km^{2}) (9.2%), private at 171,985 acres (696.00 km^{2}) (76.4%).

There are 244 terrestrial vertebrate species that are found within the North Tobacco Root Mountains and Foothills including whitetail and mule deer, elk, and black bears. The area is also habitat to several of "Tier I" species. Montana Fish Wildlife and Park's classification of native species with greatest need of conservation including the western toad, flammulated owl, bald eagle, Townsend's big-eared bat, grizzly bear, and Canada lynx, which are all threatened by habitat loss, degradation, and fragmentation, especially as a result of population growth/development.

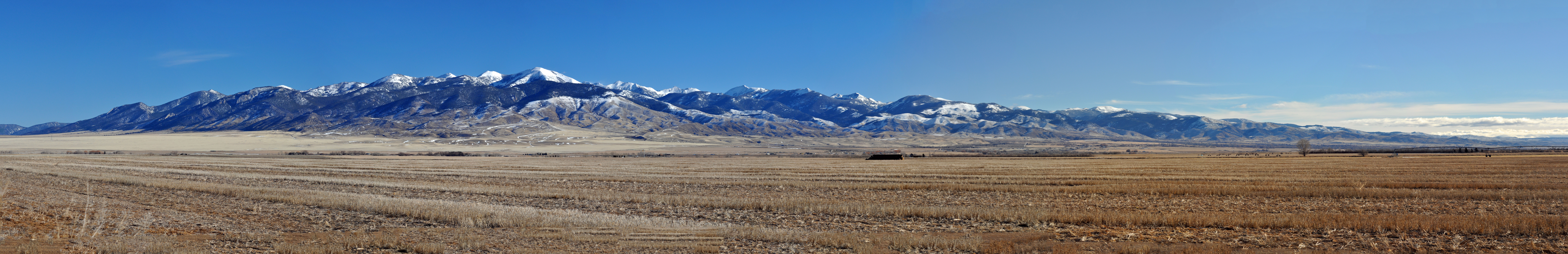
Tobacco Root Mountains SW Face from Twin Bridges, Montana

== See also ==
- List of mountain ranges in Montana
