= Madison County, Montana =

County in Montana, United States

- County
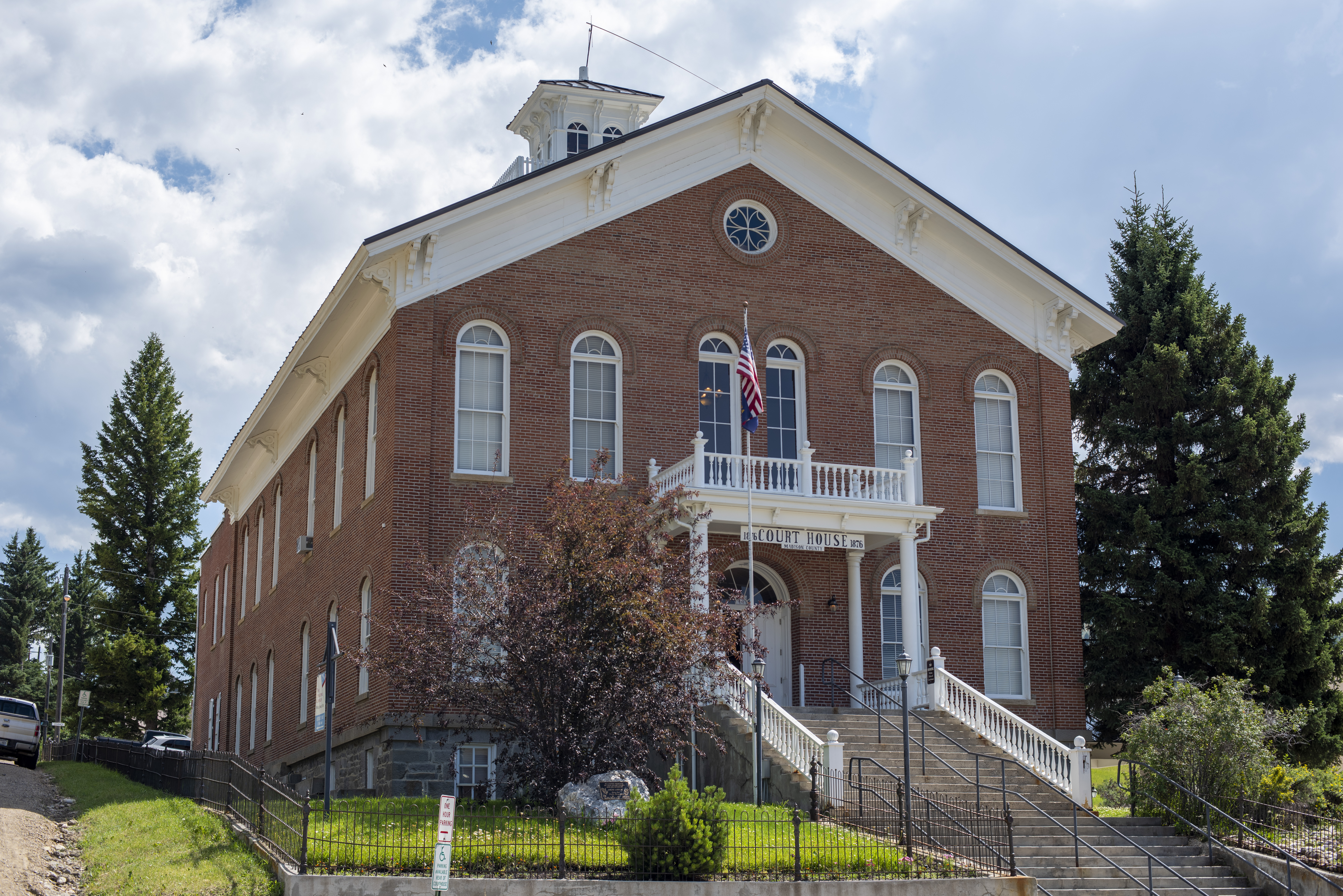
- Madison County Courthouse in Virginia City

- Location within the U.S. state of Montana
- Coordinates: 45°18′N 111°55′W
- Country: United States
- State: Montana
- Founded: 1865
- Named for: James Madison
- Seat: Virginia City
- Largest town: Ennis

Area
  - Total: 3,603 sq mi (9,330 km^{2})
  - Land: 3,587 sq mi (9,290 km^{2})
  - Water: 15 sq mi (39 km^{2}) 0.4%

Population (2020)
  - Total: 8,623
  - Estimate (2025): 10,026 ▲
  - Density: 2.404/sq mi (0.9282/km^{2})
- Time zone: UTC−7 (Mountain)
  - Summer (DST): UTC−6 (MDT)
- Congressional district: 1st
- Website: madisoncountymt.gov
- Montana county number 25

Madison County is a county in the U.S. state of Montana. As of the 2020 census, the population was 8,623. Its county seat is Virginia City. The county was founded in 1865; at the time it was part of the Montana Territory.

== Geography ==
According to the United States Census Bureau, the county has an area of 3,603 square miles (9,330 km^{2}), of which 3,587 square miles (9,290 km^{2}) is land and 15 square miles (39 km^{2}) (0.4%) is water.

=== Major highways ===
- Interstate 15
- U.S. Highway 91
- U.S. Highway 287
- Montana Highway 41
- Montana Highway 84
- Montana Highway 87
- Montana Highway 55
- Montana Highway 287

=== Adjacent counties ===
- Beaverhead County - southwest
- Silver Bow County - northwest
- Jefferson County - north
- Gallatin County - east
- Fremont County, Idaho - south

=== National protected areas ===
- Beaverhead National Forest (part)
- Deerlodge National Forest (part)
- Gallatin National Forest (part)

== Politics ==
In presidential elections, Madison County has historically voted predominantly Republican, with Franklin D. Roosevelt the only Democrat to carry the vote since 1916, the last of the three times he did so being in 1940.

United States presidential election results for Madison County, Montana
Year	Republican		Democratic		Third party(ies)	
Year	No.	%	No.	%	No.	%
1904	1,314	55.16%	971	40.76%	97	4.07%
1908	964	46.68%	1,029	49.83%	72	3.49%
1912	506	27.16%	822	44.12%	535	28.72%
1916	1,279	42.38%	1,672	55.40%	67	2.22%
1920	1,672	63.19%	877	33.14%	97	3.67%
1924	1,137	45.85%	672	27.10%	671	27.06%
1928	1,785	68.36%	812	31.10%	14	0.54%
1932	1,097	36.86%	1,764	59.27%	115	3.86%
1936	1,006	34.81%	1,819	62.94%	65	2.25%
1940	1,557	47.82%	1,674	51.41%	25	0.77%
1944	1,278	55.25%	1,022	44.19%	13	0.56%
1948	1,300	55.15%	1,006	42.68%	51	2.16%
1952	1,993	72.42%	751	27.29%	8	0.29%
1956	1,662	64.24%	925	35.76%	0	0.00%
1960	1,456	58.97%	1,010	40.91%	3	0.12%
1964	1,276	53.10%	1,125	46.82%	2	0.08%
1968	1,289	56.39%	734	32.11%	263	11.50%
1972	1,780	68.78%	669	25.85%	139	5.37%
1976	1,688	64.67%	870	33.33%	52	1.99%
1980	2,220	70.59%	676	21.49%	249	7.92%
1984	2,308	75.20%	708	23.07%	53	1.73%
1988	2,045	68.62%	878	29.46%	57	1.91%
1992	1,415	42.89%	779	23.61%	1,105	33.49%
1996	1,984	56.77%	955	27.32%	556	15.91%
2000	2,656	72.65%	758	20.73%	242	6.62%
2004	2,868	72.92%	983	24.99%	82	2.08%
2008	2,822	61.78%	1,607	35.18%	139	3.04%
2012	3,130	69.06%	1,289	28.44%	113	2.49%
2016	3,297	69.51%	1,180	24.88%	266	5.61%
2020	4,191	68.85%	1,771	29.09%	125	2.05%
2024	4,615	71.42%	1,689	26.14%	158	2.45%

== Demographics ==
Historical population
Census	Pop.	Note	%±
1870	2,684		—
1880	3,915		45.9%
1890	4,692		19.8%
1900	7,695		64.0%
1910	7,229		−6.1%
1920	7,495		3.7%
1930	6,323		−15.6%
1940	7,294		15.4%
1950	5,998		−17.8%
1960	5,211		−13.1%
1970	5,014		−3.8%
1980	5,448		8.7%
1990	5,989		9.9%
2000	6,851		14.4%
2010	7,691		12.3%
2020	8,623		12.1%
2025 (est.)	10,026	▲	16.3%
U.S. Decennial Census; 1790–1960 1900–1990; 1990–2000 2010–2020

=== 2020 census ===
As of the 2020 census, the county had a population of 8,623. Of the residents, 16.1% were under the age of 18 and 30.3% were 65 years of age or older; the median age was 52.9 years. For every 100 females there were 109.2 males, and for every 100 females age 18 and over there were 109.8 males. 0.0% of residents lived in urban areas and 100.0% lived in rural areas.

The racial makeup of the county was 92.9% White, 0.2% Black or African American, 0.4% American Indian and Alaska Native, 0.3% Asian, 1.1% from some other race, and 5.0% from two or more races. Hispanic or Latino residents of any race comprised 2.8% of the population.

There were 4,006 households in the county, of which 19.3% had children under the age of 18 living with them and 17.9% had a female householder with no spouse or partner present. About 31.8% of all households were made up of individuals and 15.6% had someone living alone who was 65 years of age or older.

There were 6,379 housing units, of which 37.2% were vacant. Among occupied housing units, 75.1% were owner-occupied and 24.9% were renter-occupied. The homeowner vacancy rate was 1.9% and the rental vacancy rate was 14.8%.

=== 2010 census ===
As of the 2010 census, there were 7,691 people, 3,560 households, and 2,192 families residing in the county. The population density was 2.1 inhabitants per square mile (0.81/km^{2}). There were 6,940 housing units at an average density of 1.9 units per square mile (0.73/km^{2}). The racial makeup of the county was 96.8% white, 0.5% American Indian, 0.3% Asian, 0.2% black or African American, 0.8% from other races, and 1.4% from two or more races. Those of Hispanic or Latino origin made up 2.4% of the population. In terms of ancestry, 31.0% were German, 19.7% were English, 18.9% were Irish, 7.3% were Norwegian, 5.9% were Swedish, 5.0% were Scottish, and 2.9% were American.

Of the 3,560 households, 21.1% had children under the age of 18 living with them, 53.9% were married couples living together, 4.5% had a female householder with no husband present, 38.4% were non-families, and 32.6% of all households were made up of individuals. The average household size was 2.11 and the average family size was 2.67. The median age was 49.8 years.

The median income for a household in the county was $42,998 and the median income for a family was $52,636. Males had a median income of $38,495 versus $28,125 for females. The per capita income for the county was $32,205. About 8.5% of families and 11.6% of the population were below the poverty line, including 16.7% of those under age 18 and 9.8% of those age 65 or over.

== Communities ==
=== Towns ===
- Ennis
- Sheridan
- Twin Bridges
- Virginia City

=== Census-designated places ===
- Alder
- Big Sky
- Brandon
- Harrison
- Jeffers
- Mammoth
- McAllister
- Norris
- Pony
- Silver Star

=== Other unincorporated communities ===
- Cameron
- Jefferson Island
- Junction
- Laurin
- Nevada City
- Red Bluff
- Rochester
- Ruby
- Sterling
- Summit

=== Former communities ===
- Union City

== Education ==
K-12 school districts:

- Ennis K-12 Schools
- Harrison K-12 Schools
- Twin Bridges K-12 Schools

Sheridan Public Schools has two components: Sheridan Elementary School District and Sheridan High School District. Whitehall Public Schools has two components: Whitehall Elementary School District and Whitehall High School District.

Secondary school districts:

- Sheridan High School District
- Whitehall High School District

Elementary school districts:

- Alder Elementary School District
- Cardwell Elementary School District
- Sheridan Elementary School District
- Whitehall Elementary School District

== Notable person ==
- Sam V. Stewart, former Montana governor and Supreme Court justice

== See also ==
- List of lakes in Madison County, Montana
- List of mountains in Madison County, Montana
- National Register of Historic Places listings in Madison County, Montana
