= National Register of Historic Places listings in Beaverhead County, Montana =

Location of Beaverhead County in Montana

This is a list of the National Register of Historic Places listings in Beaverhead County, Montana. It is intended to be a complete list of the properties and districts on the National Register of Historic Places in Beaverhead County, Montana, United States. The locations of National Register properties and districts for which the latitude and longitude coordinates are included below, may be seen in a map.

There are 26 properties and districts listed on the National Register in the county, including 2 National Historic Landmarks.

This National Park Service list is complete through NPS recent listings posted October 16, 2026.

== Listings county-wide ==
	Name on the Register	Image	Date listed	Location	City or town	Description
1	Andrus Hotel	Andrus Hotel	December 2, 2019 (#100004711)	45 E. Glendale St. 45°12′59″N 112°38′16″W	Dillon	
2	Bannack Historic District	Bannack Historic District	October 15, 1966 (#66000426)	22 miles from Dillon off Montana Highway 278; 45°08′40″N 112°58′15″W	Dillon	
3	Barrett Hospital	Barrett Hospital	January 18, 1985 (#85000109)	Chapman and S. Atlantic Sts. 45°12′28″N 112°38′29″W	Dillon	
4	Martin Barrett House	Martin Barrett House	January 28, 1987 (#86003675)	733 S. Pacific; 45°12′39″N 112°38′25″W	Dillon	
5	Big Hole National Battlefield	Big Hole National Battlefield	October 15, 1966 (#66000427)	12 miles west of Wisdom; 45°38′49″N 113°38′56″W	Wisdom	
6	Birch Creek CCC Camp		December 7, 1982 (#82000591)	North of Dillon on United States Forest Service Road 98; 45°24′51″N 112°51′22″W	Dillon	
7	The Bridges of Poindexter Slough Historic District		July 7, 2025 (#100011992)	Milepost 2.65-2.90 on Montana Secondary Highway 222; 45°10′57″N 112°40′49″W	Dillon vicinity	
8	Browne's Bridge		January 4, 2010 (#09001179)	Browne's Bridge Fishing Access Site; 45°32′50″N 112°41′36″W	Glen	
9	Canyon Creek Charcoal Kilns	Canyon Creek Charcoal Kilns	June 2, 2005 (#05000511)	Approximately 5 miles northwest of Glendale on United States Forest Service Road 187; 45°40′58″N 112°52′07″W	Glendale	
10	Canyon Resort Airways Beacon		September 19, 2019 (#100004403)	Above Pipe Organ Rock, 15 mi. S of Dillon; 45°04′13″N 112°48′39″W	Dillon vicinity	
11	Clark's Lookout, August 13, 1805	Clark's Lookout, August 13, 1805	March 10, 1994 (#94000136)	Western side of U.S. Route 91, 500 feet north of the Beaverhead River; 45°14′06″N 112°37′57″W	Dillon	
12	Dillon City Hall Historic District	Dillon City Hall Historic District	December 2, 2019 (#100004712)	125 N. Idaho St. 45°13′12″N 112°37′59″W	Dillon	
13	Dillon City Library	Dillon City Library	November 14, 1978 (#78001679)	121 S. Idaho St. 45°12′59″N 112°38′13″W	Dillon	
14	Elkhorn-Coolidge Historic District	Elkhorn-Coolidge Historic District	September 12, 2008 (#08000884)	United States Forest Service Road 2465, approximately four miles southeast of its junction with Montana Highway 43; 45°29′41″N 113°02′29″W	Wise River	Includes the Elkhorn mine site and the adjoining ghost town of Coolidge.
15	Everson Creek Archaeological District	Everson Creek Archaeological District	April 25, 2022 (#100007636)	Address restricted	Dillon vicinity	
16	Hecla House		August 10, 2005 (#05000885)	Approximately 11 miles west of Glendale on Trapper Creek Rd. 188; 45°36′13″N 112°55′44″W	Melrose	
17	William F. Henneberry Homestead	William F. Henneberry Homestead	September 19, 2019 (#100004412)	13 mi. SW. of Dillon; 45°04′35″N 112°47′25″W	Dillon vicinity	1883 homestead cabin and 1905 house, on Beaverhead River
18	Hotel Metlen	Hotel Metlen	December 13, 1983 (#83003978)	5 S. Railroad Ave. 45°13′06″N 112°37′55″W	Dillon	
19	Lamarche Game Trap		September 28, 1976 (#76001117)	Sugarloaf Mountain, north of Dillon; 45°30′12″N 112°47′50″W	Dillon	Likely created by the Shoshone
20	Lemhi Pass	Lemhi Pass	October 15, 1966 (#66000313)	West of Grant, in the Beaverhead and Salmon National Forests; 44°58′04″N 113°27′23″W	Grant	Extends into Lemhi County, Idaho
21	Montana State Normal School	Montana State Normal School	August 27, 1980 (#80002398)	710 S. Atlantic St. 45°12′33″N 112°38′22″W	Dillon	
22	Oregon Short Line Passenger Depot	Oregon Short Line Passenger Depot	April 19, 1990 (#90000628)	S. Montana St. 45°13′00″N 112°38′18″W	Dillon	
23	Sheep Creek Wickiup Cave	Sheep Creek Wickiup Cave	September 23, 1981 (#81000338)	Address restricted	Lima	
24	US Post Office-Dillon Main	US Post Office-Dillon Main	March 14, 1986 (#86000683)	117 S. Idaho St. 45°12′57″N 112°38′15″W	Dillon	
25	Van Camp-Tash Ranch		April 16, 2008 (#08000312)	1200 Montana Highway 278; 45°10′51″N 112°42′01″W	Dillon	
26	Wise River Ranger Station		August 2, 2023 (#100009207)	Beaverhead-Deerlodge NF, Wise River Ranger District; 45°47′31″N 112°56′31″W	Wise River vicinity	

== See also ==
- List of National Historic Landmarks in Montana
- National Register of Historic Places listings in Montana
