= Noah Armstrong =

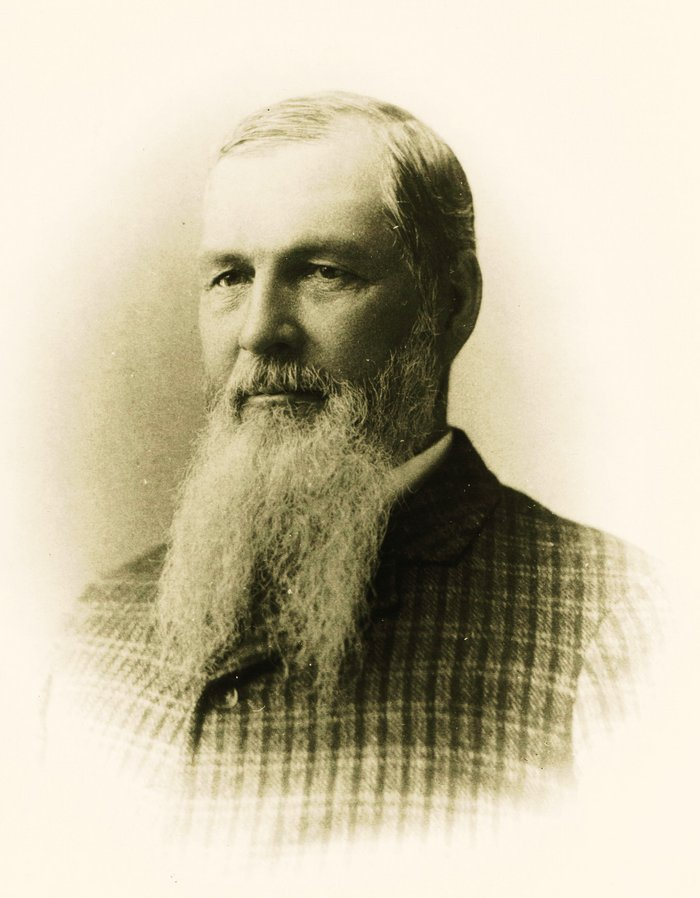
- Born: January 18, 1823; Kingston, Ontario, Canada
- Died: April 21, 1907 (aged 84); Seattle, Washington, United States
- Occupations: Smelting, Mining
- Known for: Doncaster Ranch; Breeder of Spokane
- Spouse: Hannah Howd
- Children: Emma Armstrong; Charles Armstrong

Noah Armstrong (January 18, 1823 – April 21, 1907) was a superintendent of the Glendale smelter and discoverer of the Hecla Mine in western Montana. Later in life he moved to Seattle, where he established the Seattle Transfer Company.

Armstrong was also an avid horse breeder. He owned and bred Spokane, the winner of the 1889 Kentucky Derby. Spokane is the only horse foaled and trained in Montana to ever win the Kentucky Derby, doing it the same year Montana was admitted to the Union. Armstrong's ranch was Doncaster Ranch, near Twin Bridges, Montana, which includes the Doncaster Round Barn. Built in 1882, it is a structure listed on the National Register of Historic Places and the birthplace of Spokane in 1886.

== Early years ==
Armstrong was born on January 18, 1823, in Kingston, Canada. He moved to Blue Earth County, Minnesota before moving to Montana in late 1862 or early 1863.

== Montana ==
=== Hecla Consolidated Mining Company ===
Between 1873 and 1877, Armstrong had entered into two partnerships, Armstrong, Atkins & Co. and the Armstrong, Dahler & Co. In 1877, with the growing demand for finances to expand operations at Glendale, Armstrong went back to Indianapolis and consolidated these two smaller enterprises into one company which he called "The Hecla Consolidated Mining Company." The Glendale smelter produced about one million ounces of silver, and thousands of tons of lead and copper annually until it burned down in July, 1879, at a reported loss of $100,000.

=== Doncaster Ranch ===
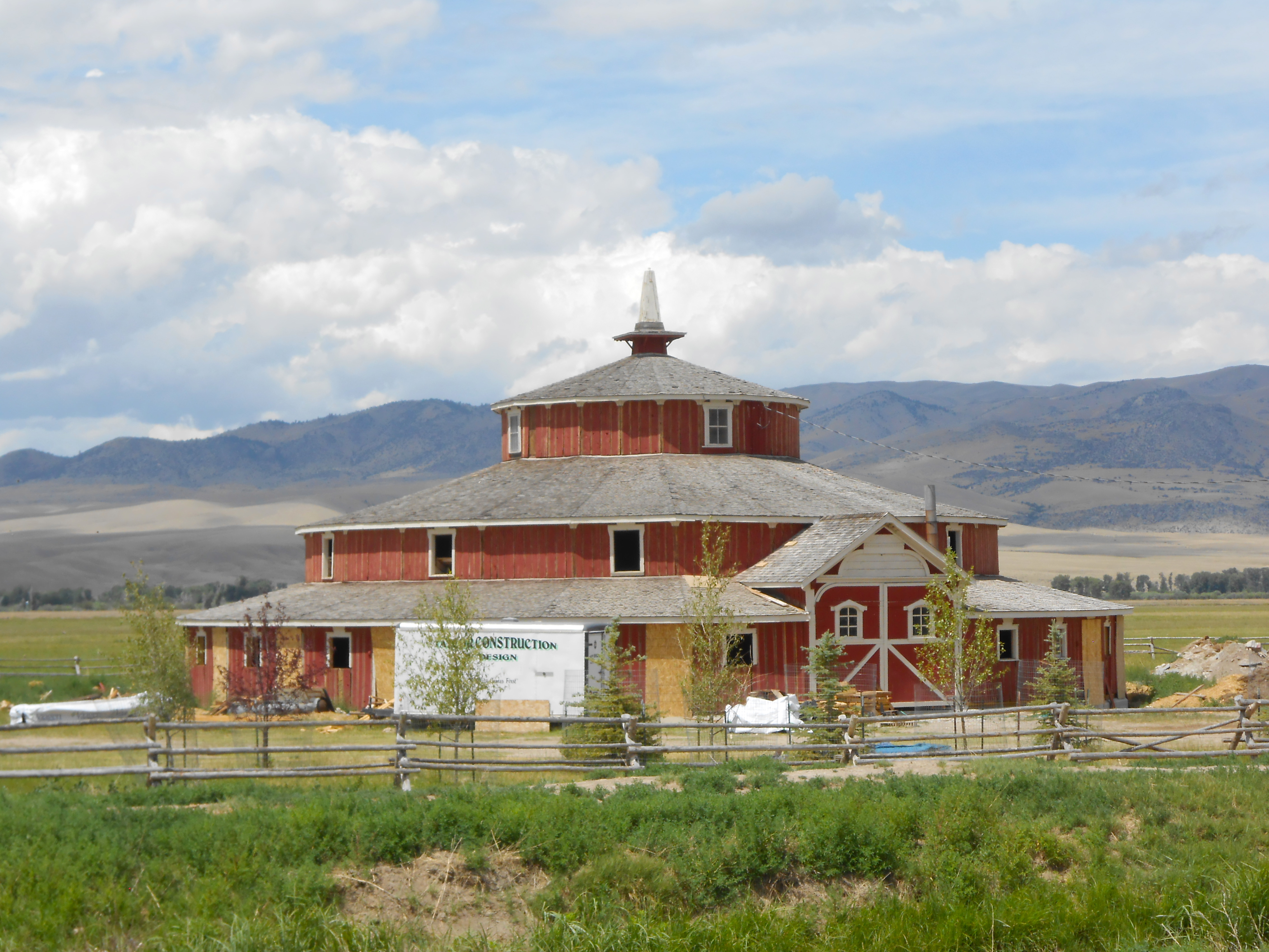
The Doncaster Round Barn

In 1882, Armstrong built a ranch for $5,000 he would call "Doncaster Ranch."

==== Doncaster Round Barn ====
Armstrong built the Doncaster Round Barn; a three-story, wood-framed round barn resembling a wedding cake. It is on the National Register of Historic Places.

=== 1889 Kentucky Derby ===
Armstrong's horse Spokane, a chestnut said to have "a coat of copper like the mines of Montana," won the 1889 Kentucky Derby, beating the Kentucky favorite Proctor Knott (named for then Governor J. Proctor Knott) by a nose.
