= Richard Rowett =

Political figure of 19th-century Illinois, USA

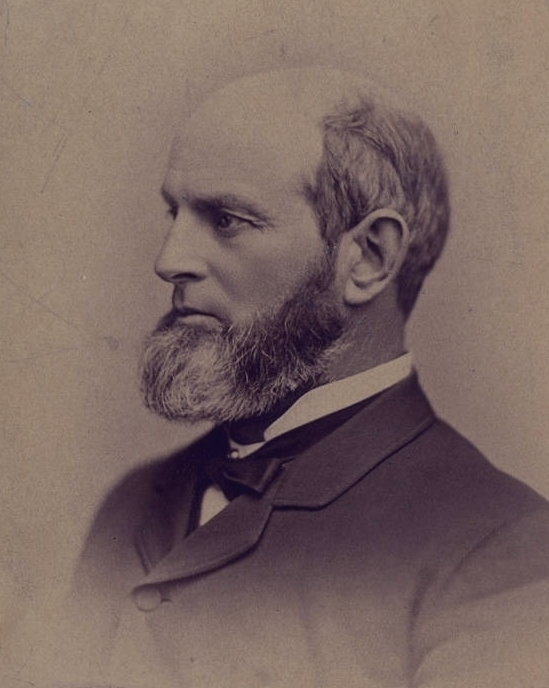
Richard Rowett

Richard Rowett (November 17, 1830 – July 13, 1887) was a leading political figure of nineteenth-century Illinois, a famous animal breeder and an officer in the Union Army during the American Civil War.

Rowett was born in East Looe, Cornwall, in 1830, the son of William Rowett, a cooper and Jenny nee Williams. Richard was the eighth child in a family of ten (five boys and five girls) and was christened in the Anglican parish of Saint Martin, Looe, on March 24, 1831. In the early 1850s, two of the Rowett brothers and one sister emigrated to Australia. In 1851, Richard decided to make a new life in the United States, following in the footsteps of his brother Joseph. He arrived in New York in July of that year and first settled in Johnson County, Indiana, but by 1854, he had moved to Carlinville, Illinois.

Rowett entered the war as captain of Company K of the 7th Illinois Infantry Regiment, which is considered the first unit from Illinois to answer President Abraham Lincoln's call for volunteers. Colonel Rowett fought with distinction at the battles of Fort Donelson, Shiloh, and Corinth and fought against Confederate guerrillas in northern Alabama at the war's midpoint. His most notable service came at the Battle of Allatoona in Georgia on Oct. 5, 1864, when he led the defense of a pivotal Union supply depot. When the war ended, he was brevetted Brigadier General of United States Volunteers.

After the war, Rowett returned to his adopted home of Carlinville, Illinois and established himself as a nationally recognized breeder of thoroughbred horses at his farm, The Meadows, one mile north of town. The Rowett colors of orange jacket and blue cap were known across Western and Southern tracks, but his outstanding production at The Meadows was Spokane, the winner of the 1889 Kentucky Derby.

Rowett is also credited by many as the first to introduce the true-bred beagle hound to America from his native England. The Rowett strain of beagles was recognized as a leader in the field of beagling around the turn of the century. Rowett was also one of three men who drafted the first-ever beagle standard for bench and show judging in 1884.

A one-term member of the Illinois House, Rowett held several statewide appointive posts and was a vocal member of the Illinois Republican Party. But his health began to fail in his later years, and he died suddenly at Washington Park (Chicago) on July 13, 1887.

As a measure of his national stature, news of his death was reported on page one of the New York Times the following day.
