= Doncaster Round Barn =

- U.S. National Register of Historic Places
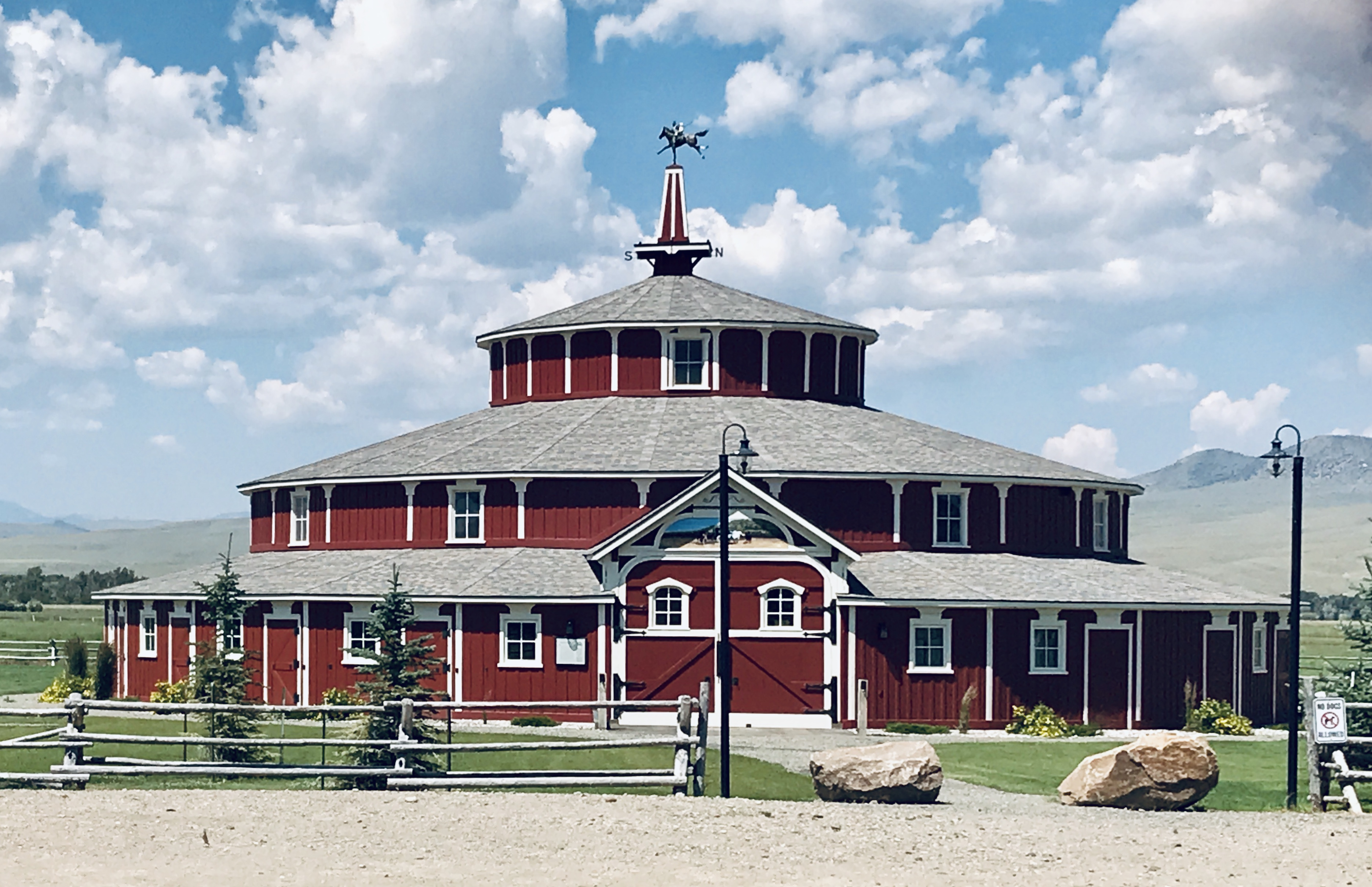
- Doncaster Round Barn

- Location within Montana Location within the United States
- Location: near Twin Bridges, Montana, United States
- Coordinates: 45°34′12″N 112°18′49″W
- Built: c. 1882
- Architectural style: Round, wood-frame barn
- NRHP reference No.: 15000150
- Added to NRHP: April 14, 2015

The Doncaster Round Barn, also called "Bayers' Barn" and "the Round Barn at Twin Bridges" is a three-story, wood-framed round barn located about 1.5 miles (2.4 km) north of Twin Bridges, Montana. Built about 1882 by mining entrepreneur Noah Armstrong to house his race horses, and featuring a 20 feet (6.1 m)-wide indoor circular aisle that was used for exercising horses, it is a National Register of Historic Places property notable for both its architecture and being the birthplace of the Thoroughbred racehorse Spokane, who won the 1889 Kentucky Derby.

== Background ==
Armstrong had made his fortune in mining, and at one time operated the Hecla Consolidated Mining Company near Glendale, Montana. During that time, he organized horse races in the mining camp, and after leaving the business he obtained property in the Jefferson River valley, near Twin Bridges, and began to raise race horses. He bought the original property from his son, and purchased additional surrounding land until he owned 4,000 acres (1,600 ha), which he originally named the Doncaster Farm, in honor of the famed English Thoroughbred race horse Doncaster, whom Armstrong admired. The property had previously been called the Jefferson River Ranch.

== Design ==
The barn was built in 1882 in accordance with a design by Armstrong and is believed to have been built by local craftsmen from area materials. It was three stories high, shaped like a "wedding cake," with each floor smaller than the one below it. The first floor is about 100 feet (30 m) in diameter, the second floor 75 feet (23 m), and the third floor 30 feet (9.1 m). The barn stands 48 feet (15 m) high from ground level to the top of the ceiling in the third floor.

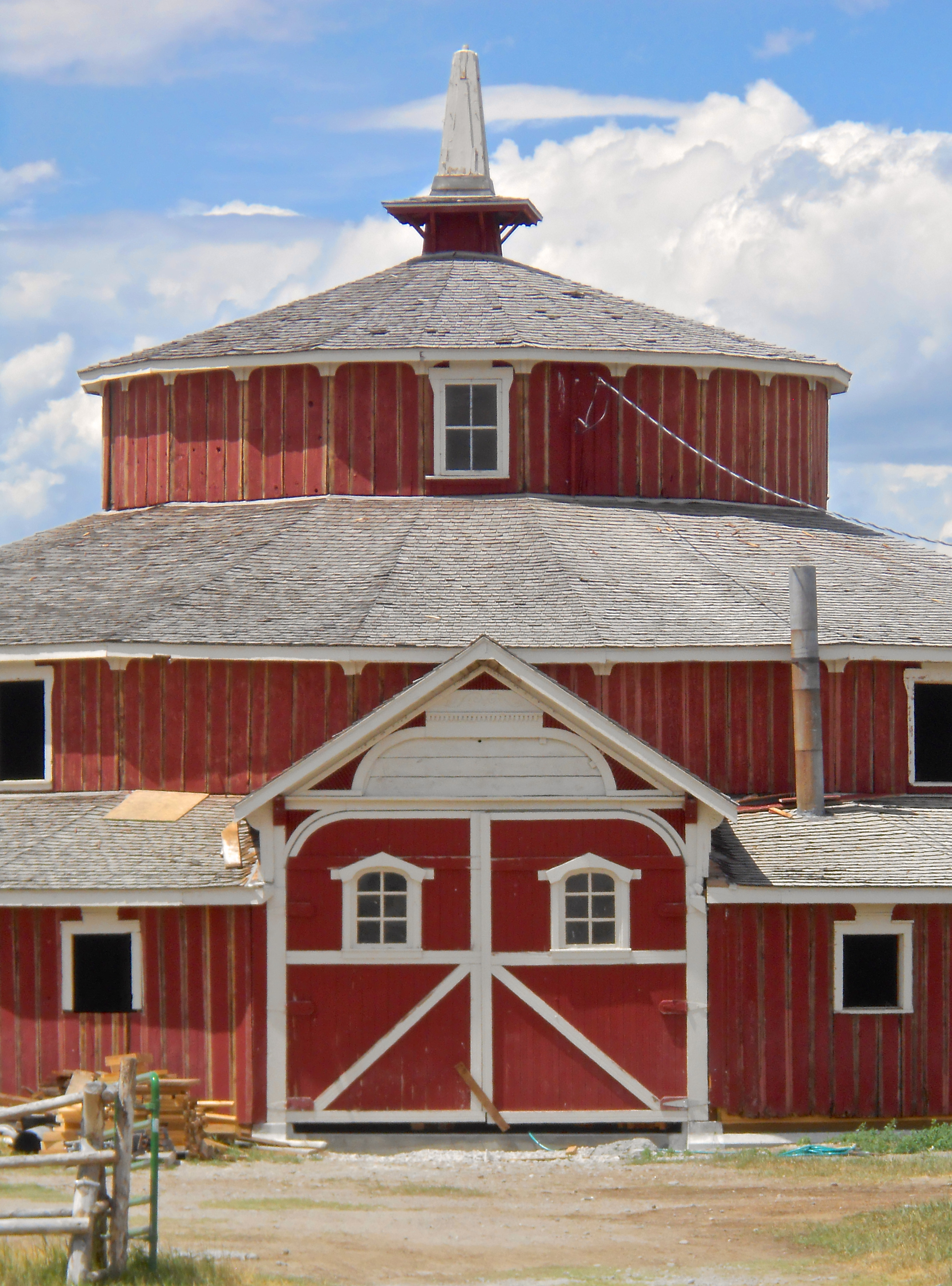
Detail of east doors of barn, said (with some exaggeration) to be able to accommodate a "ten-horse wagon laden with hay."

The foundation was set on stone abutments quarried from rock in a canyon located about five miles (8.0 km) away. Armstrong stated they were driven twelve feet below the water table and set on bedrock. The walls were of wooden planks, made of three thicknesses of lumber deep, said to be insulated with "double sheets of building paper" between each layer of lumber. The entrance to the barn originally featured an engraved 4-by-8-foot (1.2 by 2.4 m) horse scene placed over the door.

The barn featured a 20-foot (6.1 m) wide, indoor training track with dirt footing, claimed to be “nearly a quarter-mile” in circumference, (Note: The NRHP nomination states the "quarter-mile track" claim twice in the application, though the math doesn't work out if the barn is 100 feet in diameter.) on the ground floor, where Armstrong's horses were exercised. Horses normally kept outside could be sheltered there in bad weather. There were 26 box stalls on the first floor, around the outside of the track, with dividing walls only four feet high between the stalls so the horses could see one another, as Armstrong believed that "this promotion of neighborly companionship greatly [relieved] the monotony of indoor horse life." Each stall included a doorway to the outside and a window. The doorways led to 26 paddocks, one for each horse, covering 2 1/2-acre (1.0 ha). A circular structure in the center contained the tack room, two hospital stalls, and a spiral stairway. There was also an “elevator” for moving hay and grain, and a well shaft was sunk in the center of the barn, which, with the aid of a windmill on a 12-foot (3.7 m) tower at the top of the barn, drew water that was stored in an 11,000-US-gallon (42,000 L) tank on the third floor. The first floors also included office space and sleeping quarters for staff. The second floor was claimed to hold up to 50 tons of hay and 12,000 bushels of grain. The floor sloped and chutes were cut into the floor so that feed could be easily deposited into the mangers of the horse stalls below. Water from the third floor tank went through a gravity-based plumbing system to each horse's stall.

Charles Armstrong, Noah's son, said the barn "may truly be called a model of architectural beauty and convenience. This structure is so novel in its conception, so convenient in its economy, and withal so admirably adapted to the purposes of its creation, that a description of it cannot but be of interest to the readers of this sketch."

== Operation and ownership ==
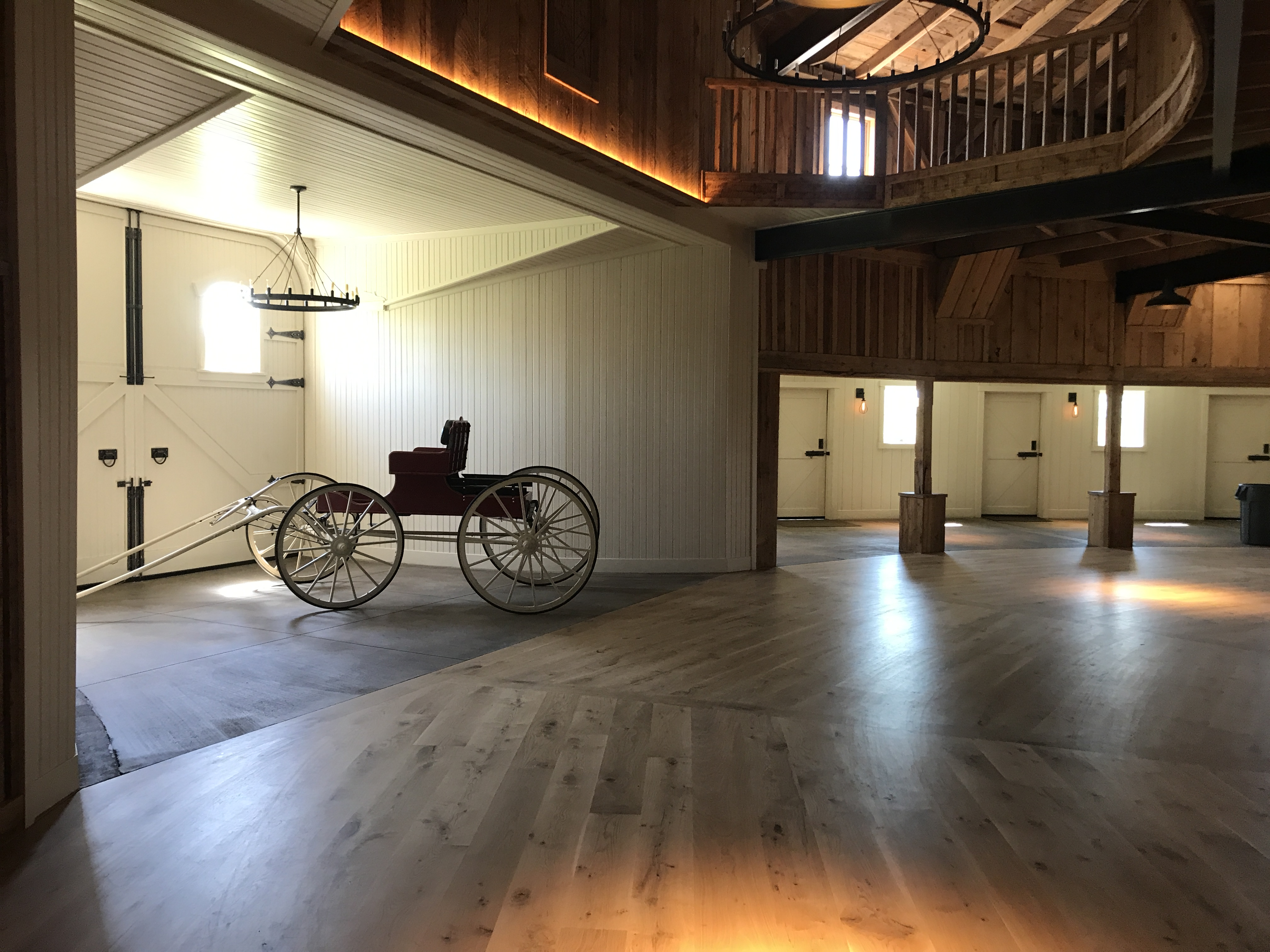
Interior of round barn, showing main door. Structure is now repurposed as an event center, horse stalls were removed long ago

Armstrong believed that Montana's high altitude and the nutrient-rich farmland along the Jefferson River made the location ideal for raising superior racehorses. He owned horses that raced at major US tracks, including a horse, Lord Raglan, who finished third in the 1883 Kentucky Derby. In 1885 or 1886, bought the mare Interpose, in foal, and shipped her to Montana. Her foal, Armstrong's chestnut race horse, Spokane, was foaled in the barn in 1886, and the horse's early training was on the barn's indoor track. After being shipped east at age 2 for race training, Spokane won the Kentucky Derby in 1889, defeating the favorite, then went on to win other major eastern races. Although popular legend states he returned to Montana, there is not evidence that he did so. He was advertised as standing at stud in Kentucky.

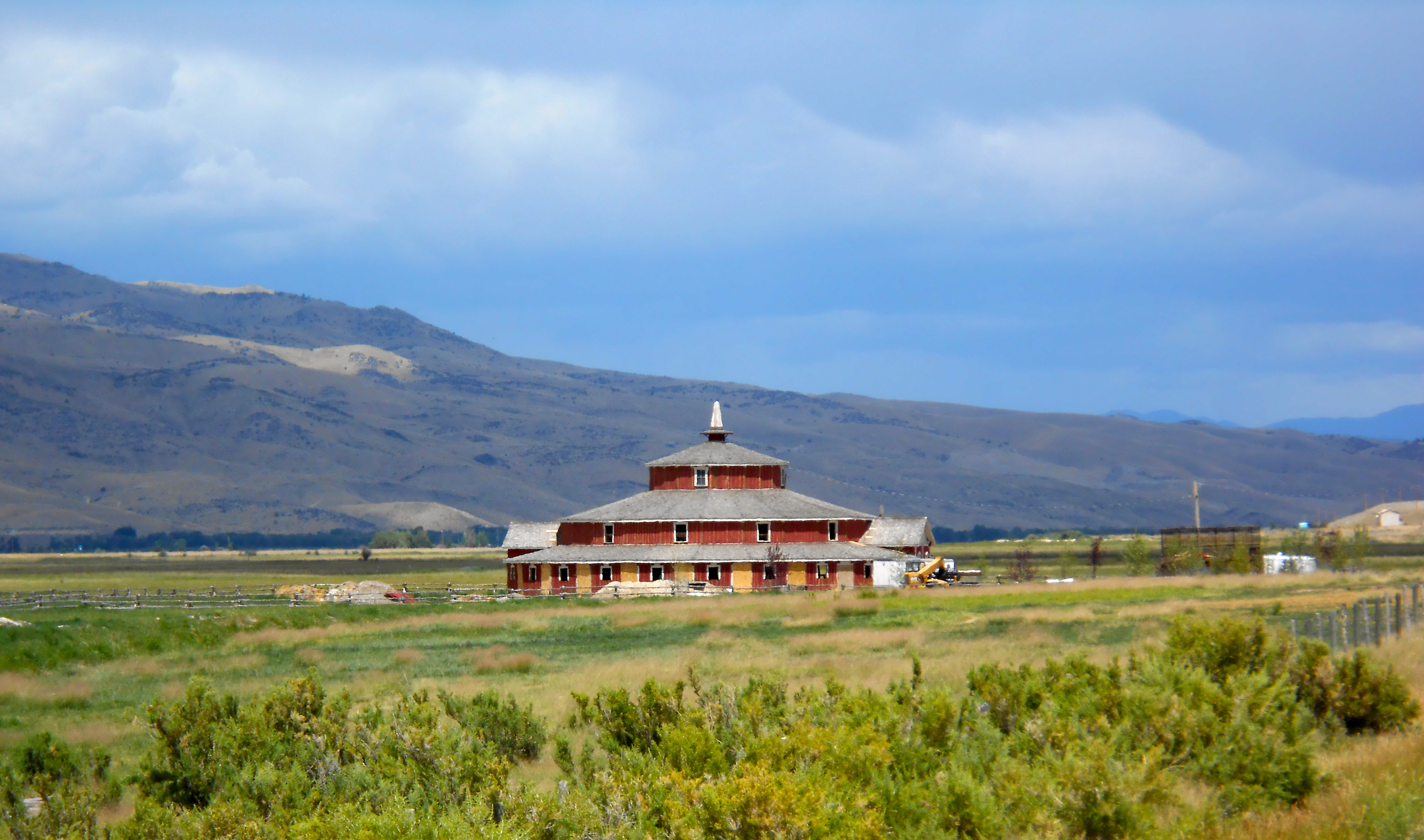
Landforms surrounding the barn and upper Jefferson River valley

The Panic of 1893 caused financial hardship for the Doncaster operation. Armstrong sold the ranch to Max Lauterbach and left Montana in 1900. From there, the barn was owned by a number of different people, and fell into disrepair until purchased by the Bayers family, who owned the Doncaster Farm property from 1933 until 1997. Arthur and Elizabeth Bayers raised Hereford cattle and were major breeders who sold their stock all over North America and held a cattle sale every year in the barn. Their son, Byron Bayers, estimated that their cattle sales over the years topped $5 million. The barn's upkeep was very expensive, particularly the cost of red paint.

The Bayers sold the parcel of land where the barn sat in 1985, and it again fall into disrepair. In 1997, it was purchased by real estate developer and local rancher named Allan Hamilton, who began to renovate the building. He had a new roof put on the building and re-leveled the foundation. In 2010, the property was purchased by Tony and Amie James. They formed Swift River investments, a Massachusetts-based business, and began to renovate the structure into a community center. Though "everyone" thought it had been listed on the National Register of Historic Places, no one had done so. In January 2015, the Montana Historic Preservation Board met and unanimously agreed to nominate it. The structure was placed on the NRHP on April 14, 2015.

The building was a Montana Cowboy Hall of Fame Legacy Award Inductee in 2008. The Jameses had been willing to donate the building to house the Montana Cowboy Hall of Fame itself, but a location in Big Timber, Montana was ultimately selected.
