= Spokane (horse) =

American-bred Thoroughbred racehorse

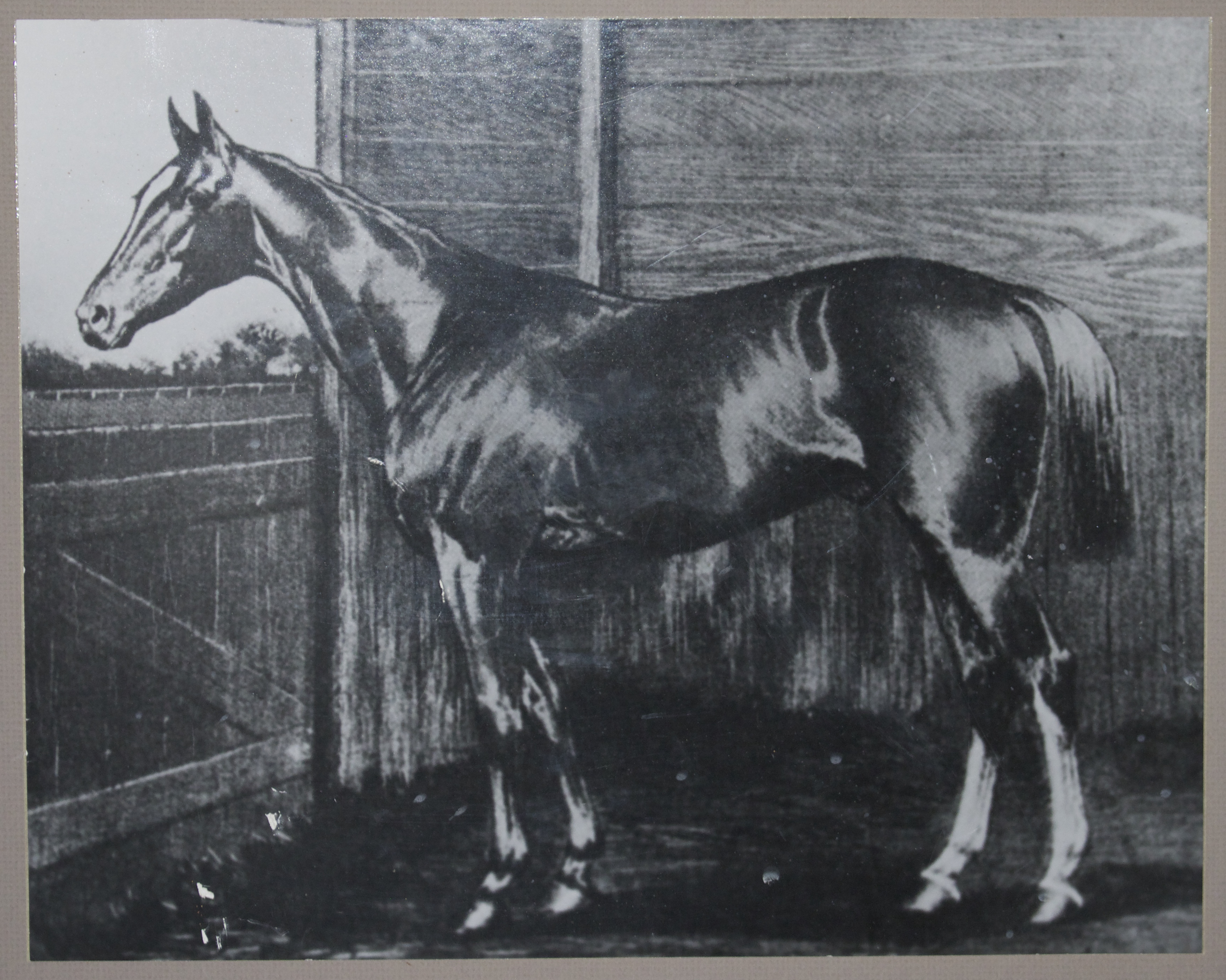
- Sire: Hyder Ali
- Grandsire: Leamington
- Dam: Interpose
- Damsire: Intruder
- Sex: Stallion
- Foaled: 1886
- Country: United States
- Colour: Chestnut
- Breeder: Noah Armstrong
- Owner: Noah Armstrong
- Trainer: John Rodegap
- Record: 17: 5-4-2
- Earnings: $26,805.00

Major wins
- American Derby (1889); Clark Handicap (1889) American Classics wins: Kentucky Derby (1889)

Spokane was a chestnut thoroughbred stallion foaled in 1886. The winner of the 1889 Kentucky Derby, he was bred by Noah Armstrong of Montana. Spokane was sired by Hyder Ali, a son of the four-time Leading sire in North America Leamington, and out of the mare Interpose by Intruder.

Spokane is the only horse foaled and trained in Montana to win the Kentucky Derby. Spokane's Kentucky Derby and racing success in 1889 coincided with Montana's statehood, as it was admitted to the Union on November 8 that same year. He is also one of only eight horses foaled west of the Mississippi to win. Ridden by Tennessee native Tom Kiley and sent off at 16.4:1 odds, Spokane defeated the heavily favored colt, Proctor Knott and set a new Kentucky Derby record for 1½ miles at 2:34.50. Spokane also won two other important races, the American Derby and the Clark Handicap. He finished second in the Sheridan Stakes and the Peabody Hotel Handicap, and had a third-place finish in the Pelham Bay Handicap.

The barn in which Spokane was foaled, the Doncaster Round Barn, located about two miles north of Twin Bridges, Montana, has been placed on the National Register of Historic Places. Armstrong was on a business trip to Spokane Falls, Washington Territory when Interpose gave birth, which is where the colt got his name.

== Racing career ==
=== Two-year-old, 1888 ===
Spokane was sent to Tennessee to train with John Rodegap, who had been a trainer for five years at that point. His first race was the Hyde Park Stakes at Washington Park in Chicago, where he finished fourth. His next race was in the fall in Louisville, Kentucky where he was unplaced. He got his first win at Latonia beating thirteen horses in a six furlong maiden race. In Nashville he won another race beating six horses going five furlongs. Out of five races that year, he won two and was off the board in the rest. He spent the winter in Memphis preparing for his three-year-old season.

Unimpressed with how the colt was handled at two, Armstrong later claimed that fired his trainer and "took hold" Spokane himself. However, documentation indicates that Rodegap still trained the colt.

=== Three-year-old, 1889 ===
On April 24 Spokane began the year competing against older horses in the Peabody Hotel Stakes in Memphis where he finished second, going nine furlongs.

The May 9, 1889 Kentucky Derby saw thousands packed into Churchill Downs (then called the Louisville Jockey Club) to see the field of eight take on the reigning American Champion Two-Year-Old Male Horse Proctor Knott. It was the largest crowd the track had seen since the Ten Broeck–Mollie McCarty match race in 1878, with an estimated 16,000 in attendance.

Ridden by Tennessee native Tom Kiley and sent off at 6-1 odds, Spokane got on the rail and closed in the stretch to the cheers of the crowd, running down the Proctor Knott to win by a nose in the final strides. In a time before photo finish, it was left to the judges who awarded the win to Spokane after deliberation. He set a new Kentucky Derby record for 1½ miles at 2:34.50, nearly beating the record set by Luke Blackburn (the sire of Proctor Knott) in 1880. His time remains the fastest Kentucky Derby at that distance, however it has not been run at 1½ miles since 1894. Kiley said after the race that he wagered $25 to win on Proctor Knott.

The people of Montana were thrilled by the victory. Helena's Independent Record called the Derby win the "biggest feather that has ever been placed in Montana's cap." A rumor emerged that he was entered to run in the Helena Derby, but did not come back to Montana.

After the Derby, many still doubted Spokane as Proctor Knott was so narrowly beaten. The pair met again a few days later on May 14 in the Clark Stakes, this time over a wet track. Proctor Knott was again the favorite, and again went to the lead. Just like the Derby, Spokane closed quickly to take the Clark by three lengths proving that his Derby victory a few days prior was not a fluke.

The pair next went to Washington Park to run in the 1½-mile American Derby on June 21, with a purse of $15,400. There was much excitement for the third match, with a crowd of 30,000 (with some claiming up to 75,000.) Proctor Knott once again took the early lead with Spokane settling midpack. With a quarter mile to go, Spokane started his move and closed fast to claim the victory, with Proctor Knott finishing last. Finishing time was 2:41 ¼. After the victory, he was adorned with a saddle of flowers in Washington Park Club colors. Armstrong was asked how much he would sell the horse for, and while insisting the horse was not for sale, he would not accept anything less than $50,000 for the colt. The American Derby would be Spokane's final victory.

The two would meet again in the Sheridan Stakes on July 4 again at Washington Park, this time going 1¼ miles. Carrying 10lbs more than his rival at 125, Spokane finally lost to Proctor Knott in front of a crowd of 20,000.

Spokane ended his three-year-old year with eight starts, winning three times, second twice, and third once. His other finishes included second in the Peabody Hotel Handicap, and a third in the Pelham Bay Handicap. He was unplaced in the Twin Cities Handicap (still finishing ahead of Proctor Knott) and Drexel Stakes.

=== Four-year-old, 1890 ===
A four, he was winless in four races but came in second twice and third another time. He was retired from racing by November 14, 1890; at one point in the year being sick with pneumonia.

== Retirement ==
Spokane began his stud career at the Woolley Breeding Farm near Lexington, Kentucky. He stood at stud in Kentucky at Fairhaven Farm, Niddervale Farm, Maxwelton Stock Farm and Elmendorf Farm at various points, but allegedly suffered from fertility issues. He had ten recorded Thoroughbred offspring. His only stakes winner was a daughter, Spirituelle.

In 1898, he was sold at auction for the low price of $170 to Woodward and Shanklins Thoroughbreds.

The final years of Spokane's life are not well-documented. Assorted myths were that he was fatally stabbed by a pitchfork, or died in a railway accident, or died peacefully at age 30 in Montana. However, Spokane is listed in the 1900 Catalogue for the National Horse Show at Madison Square Garden, with the exhibitor listed as J. Hume Carter, and thus is it likely that he lived out his life on the east coast.

== Pedigree ==
Pedigree of Spokane
Sire Hyder Ali 1872	Leamington 1853	Faugh-a-Ballagh	Sir Hercules
Sire Hyder Ali 1872	Leamington 1853	Faugh-a-Ballagh	Guiccioli
Sire Hyder Ali 1872	Leamington 1853	Pantaloon Mare	Pantaloon
Sire Hyder Ali 1872	Leamington 1853	Pantaloon Mare	Daphne
Sire Hyder Ali 1872	Lady Duke 1860	Lexington*	Boston*
Sire Hyder Ali 1872	Lady Duke 1860	Lexington*	Alice Carneal*
Sire Hyder Ali 1872	Lady Duke 1860	Magdalen	Medoc
Sire Hyder Ali 1872	Lady Duke 1860	Magdalen	Sumpter Mare
Dam Interpose 1877	Intruder 1871	Crater	Orlando
Dam Interpose 1877	Intruder 1871	Crater	Vesuvienne
Dam Interpose 1877	Intruder 1871	Lady Bountiful	Rataplan
Dam Interpose 1877	Intruder 1871	Lady Bountiful	Plentiful
Dam Interpose 1877	Lilac 1863	Lightning	Lexington*
Dam Interpose 1877	Lilac 1863	Lightning	Blue Bonnet
Dam Interpose 1877	Lilac 1863	Dolly Carter	Glencoe
Dam Interpose 1877	Lilac 1863	Dolly Carter	Myrtle

* Azra is inbred 3S x 4D to the stallion Lexington, meaning that he appears third generation on the sire side of his pedigree, and fourth generation on the dam side of his pedigree.
