= Junior Champion Stakes =

Junior Champion Stakes may refer to:

- Junior Champion Stakes (Gravesend), a defunct (1898-1908) American Thoroughbred horse race run at Gravesend Race Track
- Cowdin Stakes, a defunct (1923-2005) American Thoroughbred horse race run at Aqueduct Racetrack originally named the Junior Champion Stakes
- Junior Champion Stakes (Monmouth Park), an American Thoroughbred horse race run at Monmouth Park Racetrack 1884-1893
