= 1889 Kentucky Derby =

Horse race

15th Kentucky Derby
- Kentucky Derby
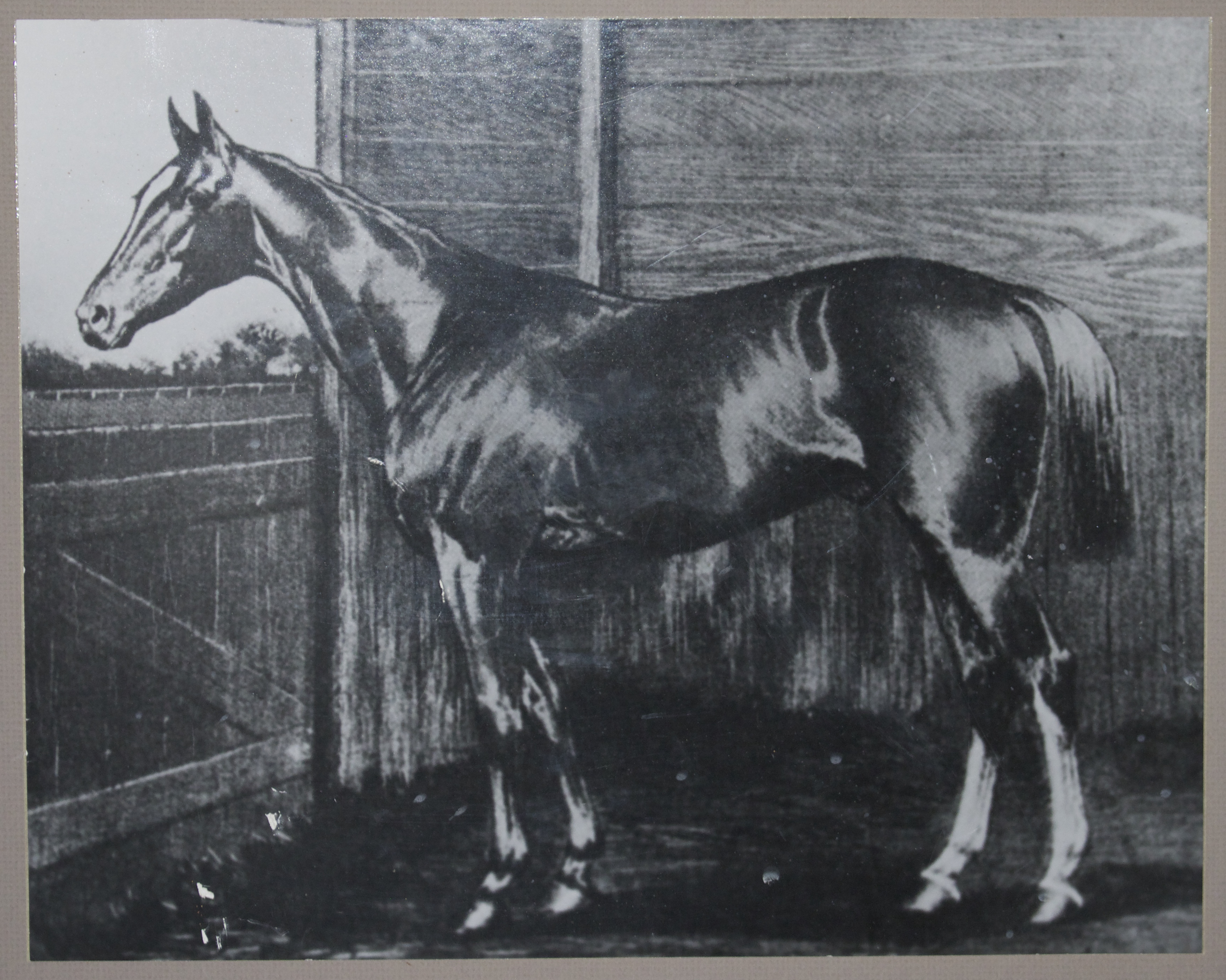
- Spokane, Winner of the 1889 Kentucky Derby
- Location: Churchill Downs
- Date: May 9, 1889
- Distance: 1 1/2 miles (12 furlongs)
- Winning horse: Spokane
- Winning time: 2:34.50
- Jockey: Thomas Kiley
- Trainer: John Rodegap
- Owner: Noah Armstrong
- Conditions: Three-Year-olds
- Surface: Dirt

The 1889 Kentucky Derby was the 15th running of the Kentucky Derby, won by Spokane. The race took place on May 9, 1889. The winning time of 2:34.50 set a new Derby record for a distance of 1 1/2 miles (2.4 km), and remains the Derby record for the distance (which has not been run since 1894.) This was the first Derby where $2 win wagers were available.

The Derby in 1889 was an exciting one for fans as thousands packed into Churchill Downs (then called the Louisville Jockey Club) to see the field of eight take on the reigning Two-Year-Old Champion Proctor Knott. It was the largest crowd the track had seen since the Ten Broeck–Mollie McCarty match race in 1878, with an estimated 16,000 in attendance.

Ridden by Tennessee native Tom Kiley and sent off at 6-1 odds, Spokane got on the rail and closed in the stretch to the cheers of the crowd, running down the Proctor Knott to win by a nose in the final strides. In a time before photo finish, it was left to the judges who awarded the win to Spokane after deliberation.

He set a new Kentucky Derby record for 1½ miles at 2:34.50, nearly beating the record set by Luke Blackburn in 1880.

Spokane is the only Montana-bred horse to win the Derby, and his win came the same year Montana became a state, when it joined the Union on November 8, 1889.

== Full results ==
Finished	Post	Horse	Jockey	Trainer	Owner	Time / behind
1st	5	Spokane	Thomas Kiley	John Rodegap	Noah Armstrong	2:34.50
2nd	9	Proctor Knott	Shelby Barnes	Samuel W. Bryant	George Scoogan/Samuel W. Bryant	Nose
3rd	8	Once Again	Isaac Murphy		Milton Young	2
4th	10	Hindoocraft	Armstrong		Scoggan Bros.	1
5th	3	Cassius	Fred Taral		Beverwyck Stable	1
6th	11	Sportsman	Isaac E. Lewis		J. K. Megibben & Co.	1/2
7th	4	Outbound	Hollis		Fleetwood Stable	
8th	13	Bootmaker	Warwick		Wilson & Young	

- Winning Breeder: Noah Armstrong; (MT)

== Payout ==
Post	Horse	Win	Place	Show
	Spokane	$ 34.80	6.30	
	Proctor Knott		2.90	

- The winner received a purse of $4,880.
- Second place received $300.
- Third place received $150.
