= Theodore Durrant =

American murderer (1871–1898)

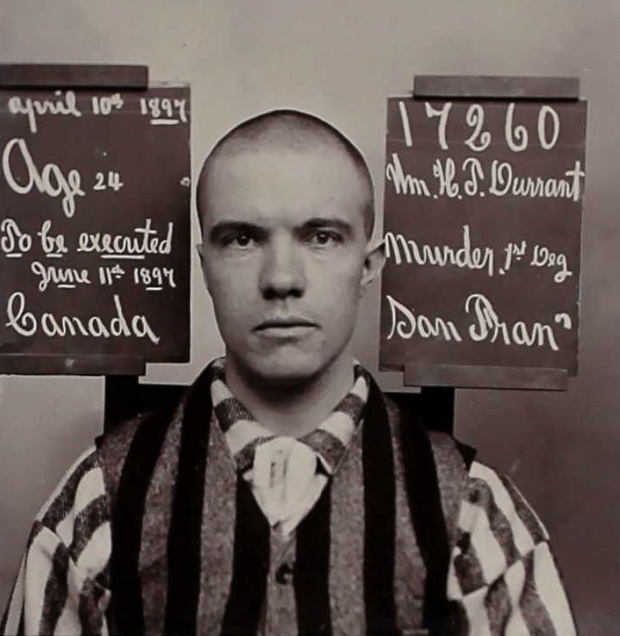
- Durrant 1897 prison photo
- Born: William Henry Theodore Durrant; April 24, 1871; Toronto, Ontario, Canada
- Died: January 7, 1898 (aged 26–27); San Quentin State Prison, California, United States
- Status: Executed by hanging
- Conviction: First degree murder
- Penalty: Death

William Henry Theodore Durrant (April 24, 1871 – January 7, 1898), known as "The Demon of the Belfry", was hanged for two murders committed at San Francisco's Emmanuel Baptist Church, where he was assistant superintendent of the Sunday School. He maintained his innocence of the crimes. His sister was stage dancer Maud Allan.

== Early life ==
William Henry Theodore Durrant was born in Toronto, Ontario, to William Durrant, a shoemaker, and his wife, Isabella Hutchenson Durrant. The family immigrated to San Francisco, California, in 1879. He had one sibling, a younger sister, Beulah Maud (or Beulah Maude), who became an actress and interpretive dancer known as Maud Allan.

At the time of his arrest, Durrant was a 23-year-old medical student at Cooper Medical College in San Francisco, assistant superintendent of the Sunday school at the 21st Street Emmanuel Baptist Church, and a member of the California Signal Corps.

It is believed that young Durrant suffered from manic depression. There were unsubstantiated rumors of a dark side to Durrant's personality. One claimed that he occasionally visited brothels in San Francisco's Commercial Street, where allegedly he once brought with him, in a sack or a small crate, a pigeon or a chicken, and at a certain time during the evening's debauch he cut the bird's throat and let the blood trickle over his body".

== Blanche Lamont ==
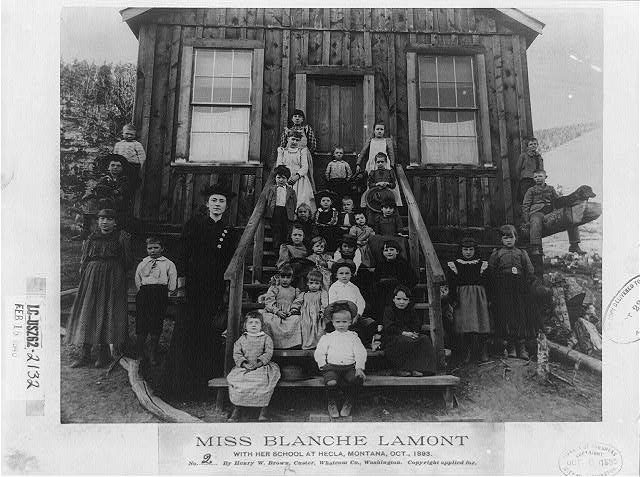
Blanche Lamont at Hecla, Montana, with her students, October 1893

Blanche Lamont (1875 – April 3, 1895) was a 20-year-old who had been teaching at a one-room school in Hecla, Montana. She had moved to San Francisco to further her education and was living with her aunt, Mrs. Tryphenia Noble, on 21st Street in the Mission District.

On April 3, 1895, Durrant met Lamont at the Polk Street electric trolley stop just after 2:00 p.m. They rode together to the 21st Street stop. Other people on the trolley stated that they were very close and that Durrant was whispering into Lamont's ear and tapping at her lightly with his leather gloves. They got off at their stop and were seen by a Mrs. Mary Noble walking down 21st Street to the Emanuel Baptist Church.

A Mrs. Caroline Leak saw them enter the church together; Mrs. Leak, who later testified at Durrant's trial, was the last person known to see Blanche Lamont alive. George King, the church choir director and organist, who was practicing hymns on the organ, testified that Durrant came downstairs at 5:00 p.m. looking pale and shaken. Durrant had given him some money, requesting that he go to a nearby drugstore and purchase some medicine, in the hopes that he may feel better. Mr. King returned a short time later and said Durrant seemed somewhat better by then, though still complaining of lingering "fatigue" and "dizziness".

Mrs. Noble came to the church looking for Lamont a few hours later, during the evening prayer service. Durrant approached Noble and inquired about Blanche; she told him that she was worried about her. Durrant told Noble that he was sorry that Blanche was not there, but that he would come to her house later to bring a book for her. Mrs. Noble later said that he did come by later with the book, having even suggested that Lamont might have been kidnapped, forced into prostitution, and/or that she may have run away to become a sex worker of her own accord, thus "abandoning her religious virtues". Mrs. Noble found these notions to be bizarre and unsettling and highly unlikely.

The next day, Durrant tried to pawn some women's rings at a pawn shop in San Francisco's Tenderloin district. These were determined to belong to Blanche Lamont. That same afternoon, Mrs. Noble received an unexpected package, consisting of several rings belonging to the missing Blanche. Strangely, the package was directed to George King (the church choir director); his name was written on wrapping paper, packed around Blanche's rings. It was three days after her disappearance that Mrs. Noble had reported her missing to the police.

Police questioned Durrant because he was the last person Blanche was seen with and, additionally, because a young woman of the church said that she had once come upon Durrant in the nude at the church library. Police did not have a body or any evidence that anything had happened to Blanche, so she remained listed as a missing person.

== Minnie Williams ==
Minnie Williams, 1895

During this time, Durrant began refocusing his attentions on 21-year-old Minnie Flora Williams (August 1873 – April 12, 1895), also an Emmanuel Baptist parishioner. At 7:00 p.m. on April 12, 1895, which was Good Friday (nine days after Lamont disappeared), Williams told her friends at her boarding house that she was going to a church member meeting at the home of a church elder named Vogel; it was Vogel's wife, Mary, who had seen Durrant walking with Blanche Lamont on the day she disappeared. A few minutes after 7:00 p.m., she was seen in an apparently heated discussion with Durrant in front of the church.

The argument was loud enough to alert a passerby, named Hodgkins, to stop and intervene. Hodgkins later testified that Durrant's manner was not becoming to a gentleman, and that the pair did calm down and enter the church door together. At 9:00 p.m., Durrant arrived at the church elder's house for the scheduled meeting.

== Trial and conviction ==
On Saturday, April 13, the women of the church were decorating the church for Easter Sunday. One of the ladies went to a cabinet to get cups, and when she opened the door, she found a mutilated female body inside. The police were called, and the body was identified as Minnie Williams. The church and grounds were searched for any clues and for Blanche Lamont, whom police now suspected to be there. Nothing was found until a church member remembered that they had not searched the belfry. Police went up into the belfry and found Blanche Lamont. She was badly mutilated and nude, with her head wedged between two boards. Police immediately began a search for Theodore Durrant, who was the last one seen with both murdered women.

Durrant had left town to join his Signal Corps unit, where he was apprehended the next day, Easter Sunday. He was charged with the murders of Blanche Lamont and Minnie Williams. The trial was covered by major newspapers across the United States.

A primary witness against Durrant was Blanche Lamont's sister, Maud Lamont. She gave an account of her sister's life before her disappearance. She testified that Durrant often came to pick Lamont up to escort her to church and then home and that he came to her house offering to search for Lamont after her disappearance.

The defense challenged her testimony about Lamont's weight, which she stated was approximately 122 pounds, with their claim that she weighed 140 and that it would be impossible for Durrant to carry her up to the bell tower. She also identified a diamond chip ring she had given Lamont that a man who was supposedly Durrant had tried to sell. His attorney defended him by citing lack of blood on him or his clothes and shifting blame to the church pastor, but Durrant was convicted and sentenced to be hanged by Judge Carroll Cook. Durrant never confessed to the murders and claimed his innocence until his death. Durrant was granted a temporary reprieve in 1897 but California Governor James Budd declined clemency.

The execution was carried out on January 7, 1898, at San Quentin prison.

== Belated legal reappearance ==
Twenty years after his execution, Durrant's name was resurrected as circumstantial evidence in a libel suit filed by his sister, Maud Allan. Allan and her producer had attempted to mount a little theatre production of Salome by Oscar Wilde in England.

An aviator, politician, and publisher of a right-wing political newsletter, Noel Pemberton Billing, responded to the theatrical event by publishing an allegation in his newsletter that the production was meant to sap British military and spiritual values by introducing indecent ideas (i.e., homosexuality) into the public from Wilde's writings.

Allan sued for criminal libel; and as evidence of character, Billing resurrected the Durrant scandal, a move that was not effectively suppressed by the court.

In the end, Billing won acquittal.

== See also ==
- Alice Maud Hartley, interrupted services at Emmanuel Baptist Church with a claim she knew that Durrant was innocent.
