= Alice Maud Hartley =

American murderer and painter

Alice Maud Hartley (ca. 1864–1907) was convicted in 1895 of killing Nevada state senator Murray D. Foley by gunshot in 1894. She was sentenced to eleven years but had served only two when she was pardoned.

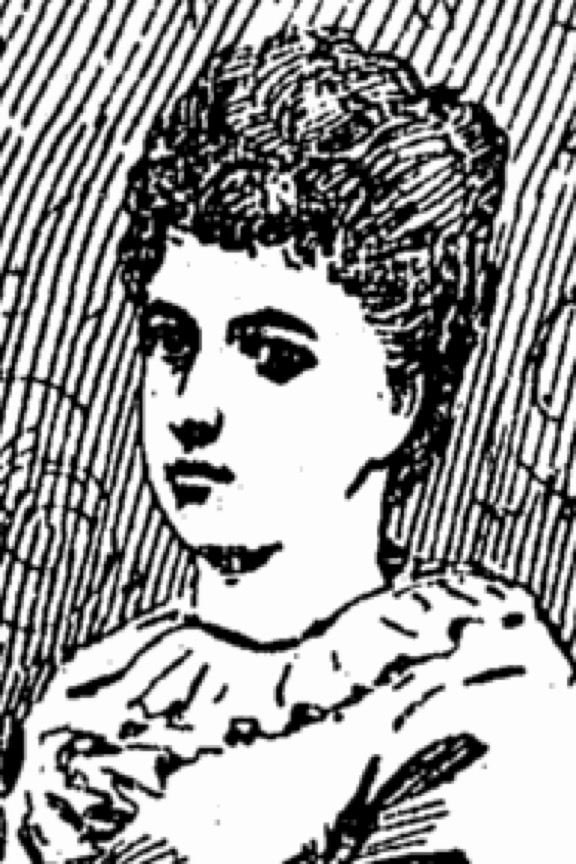
Self-portrait of Alice Maud Hartley as copied by a newspaper artist, 1894

== Early life ==
Alice Maud Hartley was born in England in 1864. She testified that she was married and had one child there. Her birth name is unknown. She came to the United States and married a silver prospector and miner named Henry Hartley in the Meadow Lake district of Nevada County, California in 1886.

Her husband died in late 1893, after which she moved to San Francisco, California, where she exhibited three oil paintings and six watercolors during the spring exhibition of the Hopkins Institute of Art. In March 1894 she exhibited at the California Midwinter International Exposition in the same city.

A self-portrait was displayed at the California State Fair in 1895 in Sacramento.

== Murder and childbirth ==
=== Crime ===
Mrs. Hartley then moved to Reno, Nevada in October 1893 and rented a studio on the third floor of the Bank of Reno, where she offered art lessons and painted portraits.

Murray D. Foley

She told investigators and testified in court that she was approached by Senator Murray D. Foley, the bank president, who visited her in her studio and insisted that she drink some liquor with him, drugged brandy and benedictine, she said. She took a sip and he persuaded her to drink it all. She lost consciousness, awoke once and then passed out again. She awoke again at 5 a.m. and he was still there.

She testified that Foley knocked at her door "several times on different nights afterward," and on February 25 she went into her room to find him inside. He kissed her violently, picked her up and threw her on a couch, where she lost consciousness again.

She found she was pregnant and insisted that he "acknowledge the paternity of the child and put it in writing. He said he would, but there must be no witnesses." On July 26, he visited her room and threatened to strike her, seizing a chair as a bludgeon. She took a pistol hidden on a shelf behind a curtain and shot him twice.

=== Trial and sentence ===
Mrs. Hartley was indicted by the Washoe County grand jury in August 1894 and went on trial the next month before an overflowing crowd of spectators. The all-male jury found Mrs. Hartley guilty of second-degree murder, with a recommendation of mercy. She was sentenced to eleven years in prison.

On November 16, 1894, she gave birth to a boy, whom she named Vernon Harrison Hartley.

Petitions both for and against the sentence were presented to the State Board of Pardons. It met on June 3, 1895, and turned down her bid for freedom. On June 18 she and the baby were taken to the state prison in Carson City, where they were assigned to two adjoining rooms and she was given the privileges of a trusty.

== Freedom and lawsuit ==
In January 1897 the State Board of Pardons granted her a full pardon on the ground that the shooting was justified in that Foley had "wronged her," that she had been sufficiently punished and that she had a child to raise.

Mrs. Hartley then proceeded to file a suit for one-half of Foley's estate, valued between $2 million and $8 million, on behalf of their son. Testimony began on November 24, 1896, in Carson City. A jury reported it stood 8 to 4 in favor of Mrs. Hartley, but could not reach a valid agreement, and the case was headed for a retrial when news came that the little boy had died of scarlet fever.

Mrs. Hartley carried on the case as the heir to her son, but in June 1897, a judge declared that her testimony was not valid and she was declared not of interest to the estate, which at that point was estimated to be only $100,000.

== Church disturbance ==
Mrs. Hartley was in the news again when she interrupted a service at the Emmanuel Baptist Church in San Francisco to stand and declare that she had a message concerning Theodore Durrant, who at that time was being tried for murdering two women whose bodies were found in the church two years earlier. She said that God had told her that Durrant was innocent and that his life should be spared.

Ushers and others escorted her from the church, where she was surrounded by passers-by and a policeman investigated, but Mrs. Hartley hurried away.

== Remarriage and death ==
Alice Maud Hartley and William S. Bonnifield of Winnemucca, Nevada, were married in San Francisco on January 4, 1899.

She died in Denver, Colorado, on December 28, 1907.

== See also ==
- Acquaintance rape
