= 7th Illinois Infantry Regiment =

- Illinois flag
- Active: April 25, 1861, to July 9, 1865
- Country: United States
- Allegiance: Union
- Branch: United States Army; Union Army
- Type: Infantry
- Engagements: Fort Henry; Fort Donelson; Battle of Shiloh; Battle of Corinth; Battle of Allatoona Pass; Battle of Bentonville

Commanders
- Notable commanders: Col. John Pope Cook; Col. Richard Rowett

Insignia
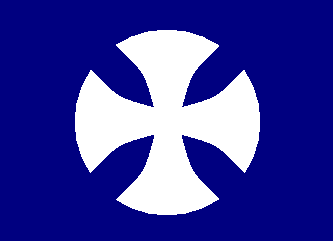
- 2nd Division, XVI Corps

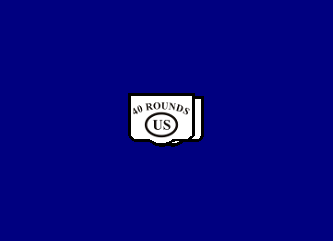
- 4th Division, XV Corps

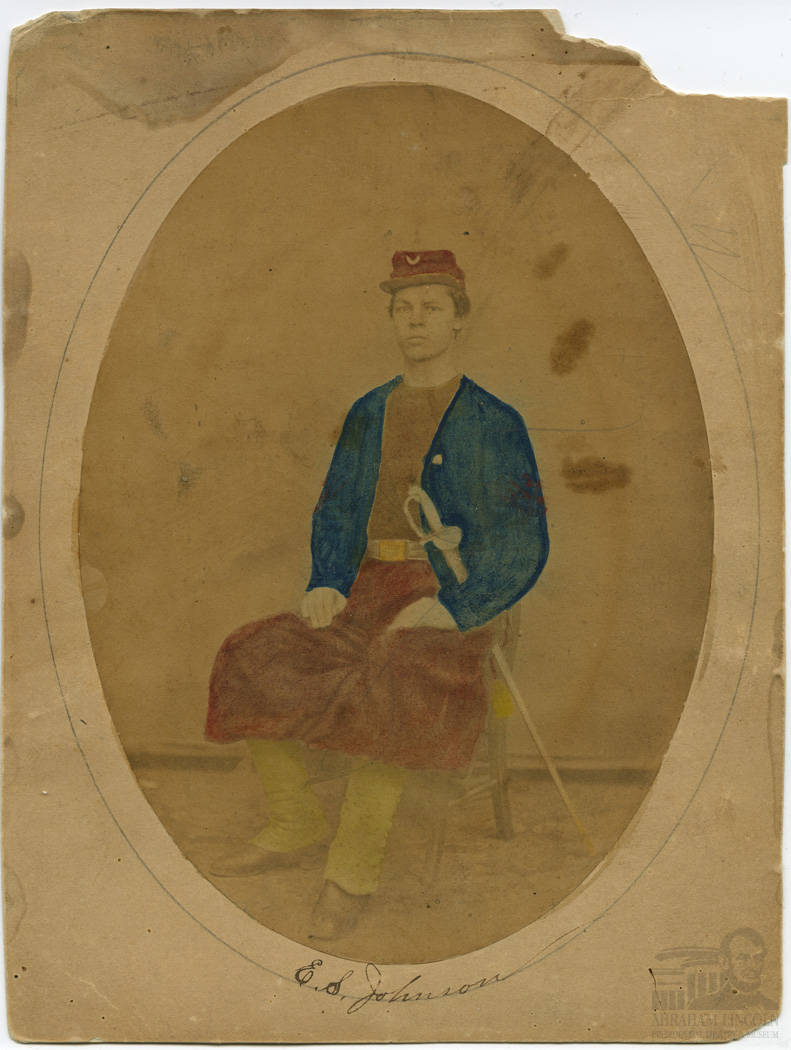
Edward S. Johnson of the 7th Illinois

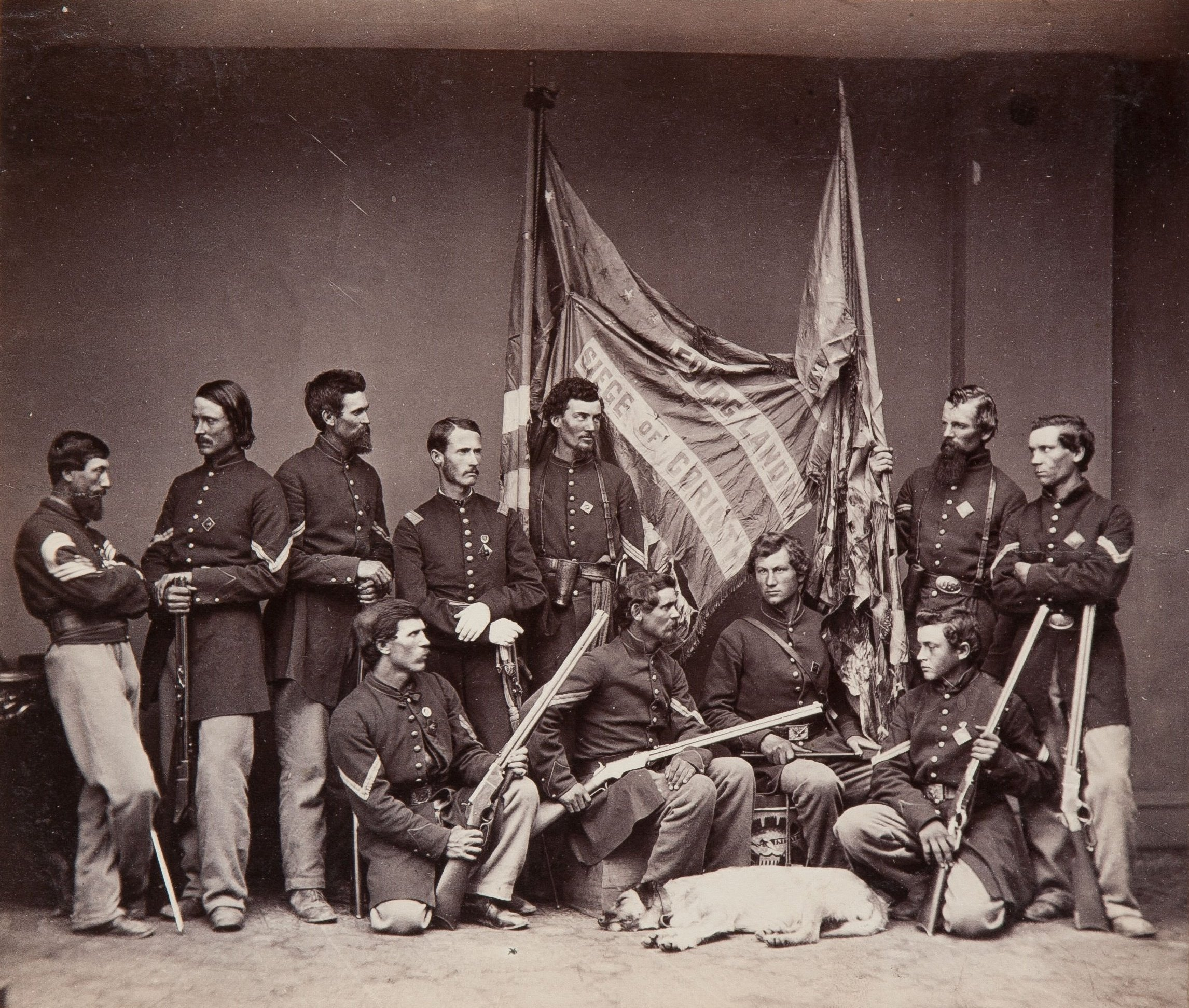
Colour-bearers of the 7th Illinois armed with Henry rifles

The 7th Illinois Infantry Regiment was an infantry regiment that served in the Union Army during the American Civil War.

== Service ==
=== 3 month enlistments ===
The regiment was created in response to Battle of Fort Sumter and President Abraham Lincoln's call for 75,000 volunteers to serve for 3 months (the longest time allowed by the Constitution without Congressional approval). At the very beginning of the war the only place for Illinoisans to enlist was the state capital at Springfield. Because of this the majority of recruits were from Sangamon County. This included several militia companies that were already uniformed and partially trained; notably the "Springfield Grays" which made up Company I. The recruits were organized at Camp Yates on the outskirts of Springfield and mustered into Federal service by Captain John Pope on April 25, 1861, for 90-days service. Camp Yates was located at the old Illinois State Fairgrounds site (currently the site of Dubois Elementary School). Throughout their training the men lived in the state fair's stables, which provided considerable comfort and relief from the elements. Despite being the first troops raised in Illinois, the regiment was numbered the 7th Illinois, paying homage to the six Illinois infantry volunteer regiments that were raised to fight in the Mexican–American War fourteen years earlier. During their service part of the regiment wore gray zouave uniforms with orange piping.

Departing Camp Yates in May 1861, they went on duty at Alton, Cairo, and Mound City, Illinois, and then at St. Louis, Missouri, until July, 1861. Companies "E" and "G" formed part of an expedition from Cairo to the Little River in Missouri on June 22 and 23.

=== 3 year enlistments ===
The original regiment was mustered out on July 25, 1861, at Cairo; some of the soldiers re-enlisted for 3 years, but most returned home and the new 7th Illinois barely resembled the original regiment. With 3-year enlistees, the regiment saw service at the Battle of Fort Donelson, the Battle of Shiloh, the Battle of Allatoona, the March to the Sea and the Carolinas campaign.

The regiment mustered out of service on July 9, 1865.

== Affiliations, battle honors, detailed service, and casualties ==
=== Organizational affiliation ===
The three-month 7th Illinois Volunteer Infantry Regiment was organized at Camp Yates, IL and served in the Department of the Missouri. The three-year 7th Illinois Volunteer Infantry Regiment was organized at Cairo, IL and served with the following organizations:

- District of Cairo to October, 1861
- Cook's 4th Brigade, District of Cairo, to February, 1862
- 3rd Brigade, 2nd Division, District of West Tennessee, and Army of the Tennessee (AoT), to July, 1862
- 3rd Brigade, 2nd Division, District of Corinth (DoC), Department of the Tennessee (DoT), to November, 1862
- 3rd Brigade, DoC, Left Wing, XIII Corps (Old), DoT, to December, 1862
- 3rd Brigade, DoC, XVII Corps, AoT, to January, 1863
- 3rd Brigade, DoC, XVI Corps, AoT to March, 1863
- 3rd Brigade, 2nd Division, XVI Corps, AoT to September, 1864
- 3rd Brigade, 4th Division, XV Corps, AoT to July, 1865.

=== Battles ===
The 7th Illinois fought in the following battles:

- Fort Henry
- Fort Donelson
- Battle of Shiloh
- Battle of Corinth
- Battle of Allatoona Pass
- Battle of Bentonville

=== Detailed service ===
The regiment's detailed service and locations are as follows:

==== 1861 ====
- Duty at Alton, Cairo, Mound City, IL, and St. Louis, MO, till July - 3 mos. regt.
- Expedition from Cairo to Little River June 22–23 (Cos. "E" and "G") - 3 mos. regt.
- Mustered out July 25, 1861, expiration of term - 3 mos. regt.
- Moved to Ironton, Mo., thence to Cape Girardeau, Mo., August 23, 1861 - 3 yr. regt. from here
- Duty there and at Fort Holt, KY, till February, 1862
- Expedition toward Columbus, KY, September 21–22, 1861
- Skirmish at Mansfield's Creek September 22
- Expedition to Elliott's Mills during Belmont November 6–7.

==== 1862 ====
- Reconnoissance of Columbus, KY, January 13–20
- Movements against Fort Henry, TN, February 2–6
- Investment and capture of Fort Donelson, TN, February 12–16
- Expedition to Clarksville and Nashville, TN, February 19–21
- Moved to Pittsburg Landing, TN, arriving there March 22
- Battle of Shiloh, Tenn., April 6–7
- Advance on and siege of Corinth, MS, April 29-May 30
- Pursuit to Booneville May 31-June 11
- Duty at Corinth, Miss., till October
- Battle of Corinth October 3–4
- Pursuit to Hatchie River October 5–12
- Duty at Corinth till April, 1863
- Dodge's Expedition to intercept Forest, and operations in West Tennessee, December 18, 1862, to January 3, 1863

==== 1863 ====
- Dodge's Expedition to Northern Alabama April 15-May 8
- Iuka, MS, April 16
- Great Bear Creek, Cherokee Station and Lundy's Lane April 17
- Rock Cut, near Tuscumbia, April 22
- Tuscumbia April 23
- Town Creek April 28
- Guard Railroad from Bethel to Jackson, TN, May 12 to June 8
- Regiment mounted June 18
- Engaged in scout and patrol duty through West Tennessee till October, participating in numerous expeditions and skirmishes
- Expedition from Corinth to Henderson, TN, September 11–16
- Skirmish at Clark's Creek Church September 13
- Henderson's Station September 14
- Expedition into West Tennessee September 27-October 1
- Swallow's Bluff September 30
- At Chewalla October 4–26
- Moved to Iuka October 26
- Thence marched to Pulaski, TN, November 1–12
- Scout to Lawrenceburg November 17–19
- Scout duty around Pulaski till December 22
- Skirmishes near Florence December 1
- Near Eastport December 2
- Scout to Florence December 11–17
- Shoal Creek, near Wayland Springs, December 12
- Regiment Veteranize December 22 and mustered in as Veterans January 5, 1864

==== 1864 ====
- Veterans on furlough January and February, 1864
- Return to Pulaski February 23–27
- Duty at Florence, AL
- Patrolling Tennessee River till June
- At Florence, Sweetwater and Centre Store till June 14
- Repulse of Roddy's attack on Florence May 7
- Decatur May 8
- Pulaski May 13
- Regiment dismounted and moved to Chattanooga, TN, June 14–17
- Thence to Tilton, GA
- Patrol Railroad from Dalton to Resaca, GA, till July 7
- Moved to Rome, GA, July 7
- Duty at Rome till October. (Non-Veterans mustered out July 29, 1864.)
- Action at Etowah River September 15
- Operations against Hood September 29-November 3
- Defence of Allatoona Pass October 4–5
- Reconnoissance from Rome on Cave Springs Road and skirmishes October 12–13
- March to the sea November 15-December 10
- Regiment remounted November 21
- Ogeechee Canal December 9
- Siege of Savannah December 10–21
- Hinesville December 16

==== 1865 ====
- Campaign of the Carolinas January to April, 1865
- Hickory Hill, SC, February 1
- Salkehatchie Swamps February 2–5
- Fishburn's Plantation, near Lane's Bridge, Salkehatchie, February 6
- South Edisto River February 9
- North Edisto River February 11–12
- Columbia February 15–17
- Lynch's Creek February 26
- Cheraw March 2–3
- Expedition from Cheraw to Florence and skirmishes March 4–6
- Battle of Bentonville, NC, March 19–21
- Occupation of Goldsborough, March 24
- Occupation of Raleigh April 14
- Bennett's House April 26
- Surrender of Johnston and his army
- March to Washington, DC, via Richmond, VA, April 29-May 19
- Grand Review May 24
- Moved to Louisville, KY, June, and duty there till July
- Mustered out July 9, 1865.

=== Total strength and casualties ===
The regiment suffered 8 officers and 81 enlisted men who were killed in action or who died of their wounds and 3 officers and 174 enlisted men who died of disease, for a total of 266 fatalities.

== Commanders ==
- Colonel John Pope Cook - Promoted to brigadier general March 21, 1862.
- Colonel Andrew J. Babcock - resigned February 1865.
- Colonel Richard Rowett - mustered out with regiment

== See also ==
- List of Illinois Civil War Units
- Illinois in the American Civil War
