= Hotel Metlen =

Historic building in Dillon, Montana, US

- U.S. National Register of Historic Places
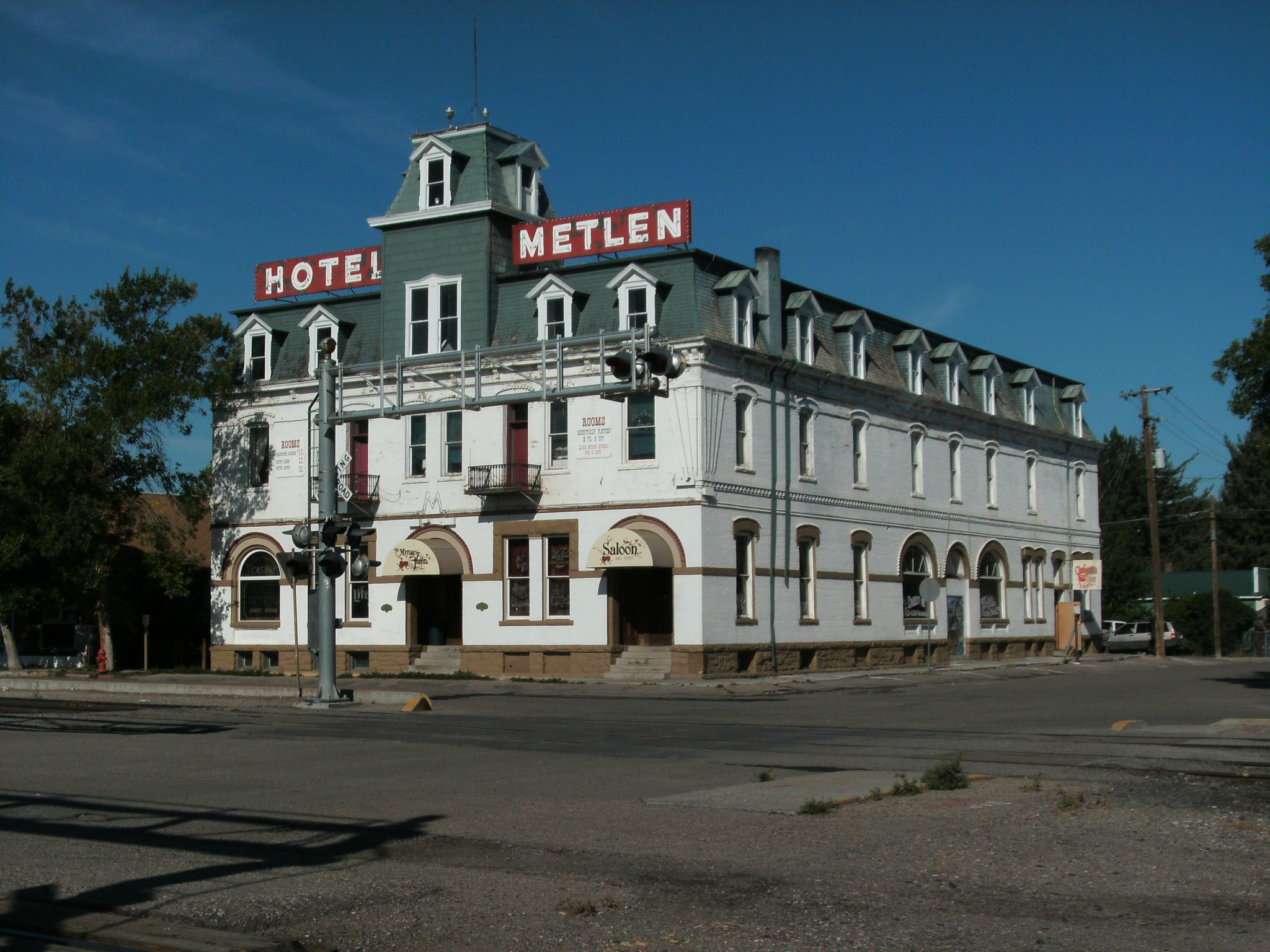

- Location within Montana Location within the United States
- Location: 5 S. Railroad Ave., Dillon, Montana
- Coordinates: 45°13′6″N 112°37′55″W
- Area: less than one acre
- Built: 1887
- Architectural style: Second Empire
- NRHP reference No.: 83003978
- Added to NRHP: December 13, 1983

Hotel Metlen is a historic building in Dillon in Beaverhead County, Montana. Built in 1897 by Joseph C. Metlen, it is at 5 S. Railroad Avenue. It was listed on the National Register of Historic Places in 1983.

Prominent in the community, it was built to accommodate travellers and is located by the city's railroad stop — across the right-of-way of the Union Pacific Railroad from the main business district of Dillon. The hotel featured two historic saloons, dance floor, restaurant and a gaming casino.

A two-story building made of sandstone bricks, it is Second Empire in style.

== See also ==
- National Register of Historic Places listings in Beaverhead County, Montana
