= Andrus Hotel =

Historic hotel building in Dillon, Montana

- U.S. National Register of Historic Places
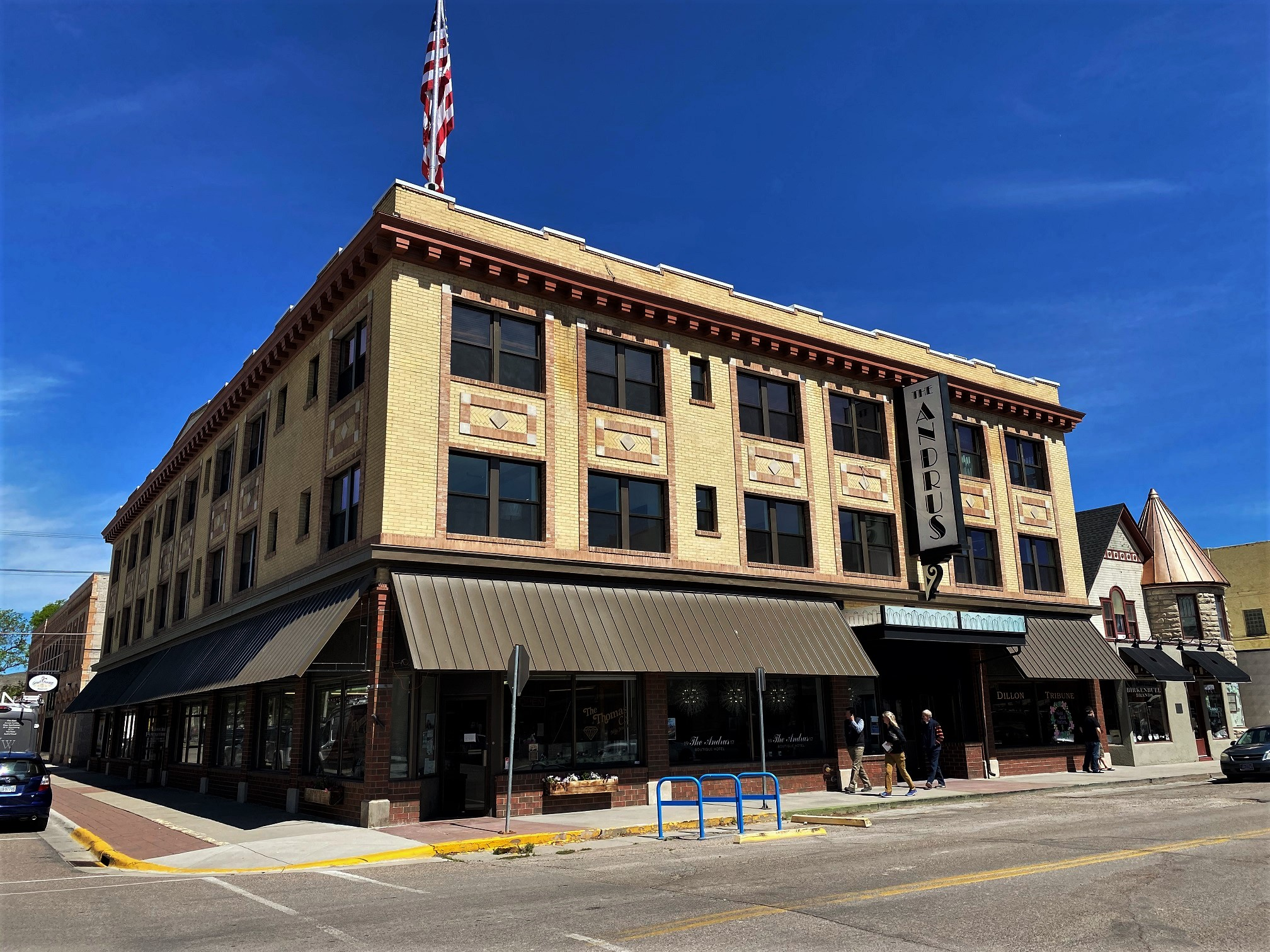

- Location within Montana
- Location: 45 E. Glendale St., Dillon, Montana
- Coordinates: 45.2165°N 112.6377°W
- Built: 1917
- NRHP reference No.: 100004711
- Added to NRHP: December 2, 2019

The Andrus Hotel at 45 E. Glendale Street in Dillon, Montana, was built in 1917. It was added to the National Register of Historic Places in 2019.

== History ==
Built in 1917 by Harry Andrus, a sheep rancher, it opened to the public in 1918. The architect, Jesse Warren designed the luxurious Renaissance Revival style hotel. The Andrus Hotel was the second hotel in Dillon.

The hotel was built over a block east of the former Union Pacific Railroad station (now the Beaverhead County Museum) along a former Utah and Northern Railway line.

It was managed by Henry Andrus until he died in 1941.

In 2017, Joshua H. Baum under the direction of Mark Rienberger tried to make the case for preserving the hotel, along with other structures related to past automobile-related travel.

The hotel reopened in 2020 after a major restoration project. It became a member of Historic Hotels of America in 2021.

It was named a Finalist in 2022 for a Historic Hotels of America Award of Excellence.

== See also ==
- National Register of Historic Places listings in Beaverhead County, Montana
