= Hecla House =

Historic house in Montana, United States

- U.S. National Register of Historic Places
- Location within Montana Location within the United States
- Nearest city: Melrose, Montana
- Coordinates: 45°36′13″N 112°55′44″W
- Area: less than one acre
- Built: 1881
- Architectural style: rustic
- NRHP reference No.: 05000885
- Added to NRHP: August 10, 2005

The Hecla House, in Beaverhead County, Montana near Melrose, was built in 1881. It was listed on the National Register of Historic Places in 2005.

It is a one-story 18 by 28 feet (5.5 m × 8.5 m) log building, built of squared logs with dovetail notching upon a dry fieldstone foundation. It is the last standing building in the former townsite of Hecla, a company mining town below the glacial cirque headwall of Lion Mountain.

It is located about 11 miles (18 km) west of Glendale on Trapper Creek Rd. #188.
