= William F. Henneberry Homestead =

- U.S. National Register of Historic Places
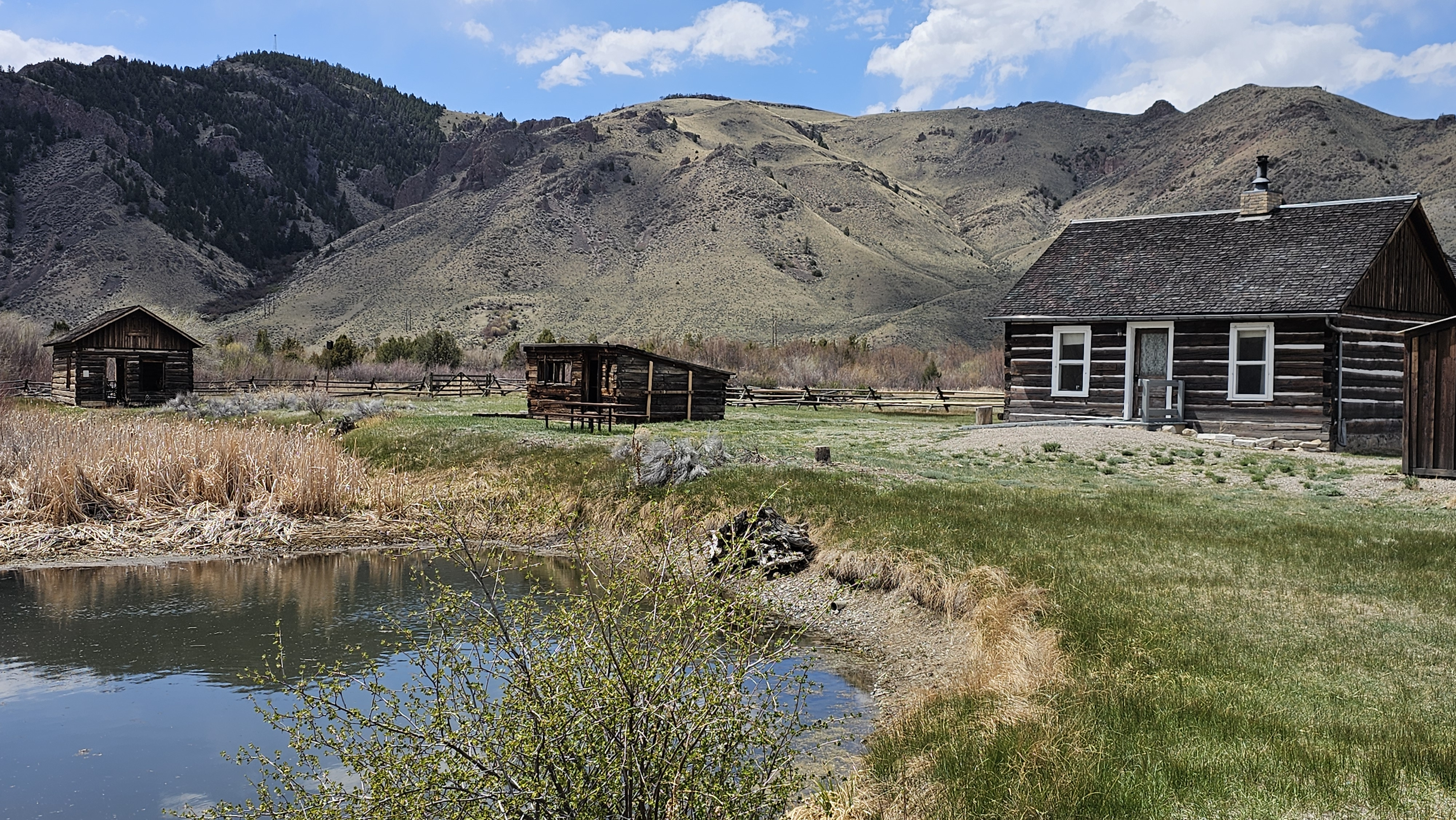
- The houses in 2025

- Location within Montana
- Location: Beaverhead County, Montana, 13 miles (21 km) southwest of Dillon, Montana
- Coordinates: 45.076400°N 112.790296°W
- Area: 33 acres (13 ha)
- Built: 1883, 1905
- NRHP reference No.: 100004412
- Added to NRHP: September 19, 2019

The William F. Henneberry Homestead, in Beaverhead County, Montana near Dillon, Montana, was built in 1905. It was listed on the National Register of Historic Places in 2019.

It's on what is known as Ney Ranch.

The listing includes four contributing buildings and nine contributing sites.

It is located on what is now Bureau of Land Management (BLM) property. It includes an 1883 cabin, the 1905 house, a chicken coop, and remnants of several structures, as well as "farm machinery and trash dumps." The 1905 house has been adapted to serve as a rental by the BLM, and non-contributing features have been added.

The Lewis and Clark Expedition passed through the property in 1805.

It is located on the west side of the Beaverhead River, about 2,000 feet (610 m) south of the Dalys, Montana exit off Interstate 15.
