= Junior Champion Stakes (Monmouth Park) =

- Class: Discontinued stakes
- Location: Monmouth Park Racetrack, Eatontown, New Jersey, United States
- Race type: Thoroughbred - Flat racing

Race information
- Distance: 6 furlongs
- Surface: Dirt
- Track: left-handed
- Qualification: Two-year-olds

The Junior Champion Stakes was a Thoroughbred horse race for two-year-olds of either sex run from 1884 through 1893 at the Monmouth Park Racetrack in Eatontown, New Jersey. Run on dirt, it was contested over a distance of six furlongs.

== Historical notes ==
The filly Wanda beat eleven other runners to win the 1884 inaugural running of the Junior Champion Stakes for prominent owner Pierre Lorillard. In a review of American Thoroughbred racing history by Thoroughbred Heritage, they selected Wanda as both the 1884 Champion Two-Year-Old Filly and 1885 Champion Three-Year-Old Filly. Ban Fox, the 1885 winner of the Junior Champion Stakes, would also earn American Champion Two-Year-Old Colt recognition by Thoroughbred Heritage.

In 1886 the race was won by the outstanding colt Tremont who, in his only year of racing, would win all sixteen of his starts. In The Blood-Horse magazine's review of American Thoroughbred racing history, Tremont was chosen American Champion Two-Year-Old Colt. The Tremont Stakes at New York's Belmont Park is named in his honor. Similarly, The Blood-Horse magazine selected Proctor Knott as their 1888 Champion. Proctor Knott also won the most important race in the United States at the time, the Futurity Stakes.

Strathmeath, the 1890 winner owned and trained by Green B. Morris, won a number of important stakes in his career including the high profile American Derby in 1891.

In the 1893 final running, Senator Grady upset Henry of Navarre who in 1894 and 1895 would earn American Horse of the Year honors.

Racing ended when the track did not open for the 1894 racing season due to a ban on parimutuel betting enacted by the New Jersey Legislature. In May 1894, the Township Committee at Eatontown, New Jersey ordered the seizure and sale of the Monmouth Park Association's grandstand and other property for the payment of back taxes and on May 7 was sold at a public auction.

=== End of a race and of a racetrack ===
Racing ended when the track did not open for the 1894 racing season due to a ban on parimutuel betting enacted by the New Jersey Legislature. In May 1894, the Township Committee at Eatontown, New Jersey ordered the seizure and sale of the Monmouth Park Association's grandstand and other property for the payment of back taxes and on May 7 was sold at a public auction.

=== Another Monmouth Park Junior Champion Stakes ===
From 1988 through 2011 the Monmouth Park Racetrack at Oceanport, New Jersey hosted a Junior Champion Stakes race. This one would be run on turf for two-year-old fillies at a distance of one mile.

== Records ==
Speed record:

- 1:12.50 @ 6 furlongs: Don Alonzo (1892)

Most wins by a jockey:

- 3 - Shelby Barnes (1888, 1889, 1891)

Most wins by a trainer:

- 3 - Matthew Byrnes (1884, 1890, 1891)

Most wins by an owner:

- 2 - Dwyer Brothers Stable (1886, 1887)
- 2 - Marcus Daly (1891, 1893)

== Winners ==
| Year | Winner | Age | Jockey | Trainer | Owner | Dist. (Furlongs) | Time | Win $ |
|---|---|---|---|---|---|---|---|---|
| 1893 | Senator Grady | 2 | William R. Midgley Sr. | Matthew Byrnes | Marcus Daly | 6 F | 1:13.25 | $20,775 |
| 1892 | Don Alonzo | 2 | Tod Sloan | Matthew M. Allen | Frank A. Ehret | 6 F | 1:12.50 | $16,105 |
| 1891 | Sir Matthew | 2 | Shelby Barnes | Matthew Byrnes | Marcus Daly | 6 F | 1:13.25 | $23,800 |
| 1890 | Strathmeath | 2 | Isaac Burns Murphy | Green B. Morris | Green B. Morris | 6 F | 1:16.75 | $24,420 |
| 1889 | Protection | 2 | Shelby Barnes | Edward D. Brown | Edward D. Brown | 6 F | 1:20.50 | $22,120 |
| 1888 | Proctor Knott | 2 | Shelby Barnes | Samuel W. Bryant | George W. Scoggin & Samuel W. Bryant | 6 F | 1:14.00 | $20,785 |
| 1887 | King Fish | 2 | Jim McLaughlin | Frank McCabe | Dwyer Brothers Stable | 6 F | 1:15.75 | $18,895 |
| 1886 | Tremont | 2 | Jim McLaughlin | Frank McCabe | Dwyer Brothers Stable | 6 F | 1:17.25 | $8,800 |
| 1885 | Ban Fox | 2 | William Hayward Sr. | Raleigh Colston Sr. | Jack P. Chinn & George W. Morgan | 6 F | 1:15.00 | $8,500 |
| 1884 | Wanda | 2 | Harris Olney | Matthew Byrnes | Pierre Lorillard IV | 6 F | 1:18.25 | $10,000 |
