= Melrose, Montana =

Community in Montana, United States of America

Coordinates: 45°37′55″N 112°41′04″W

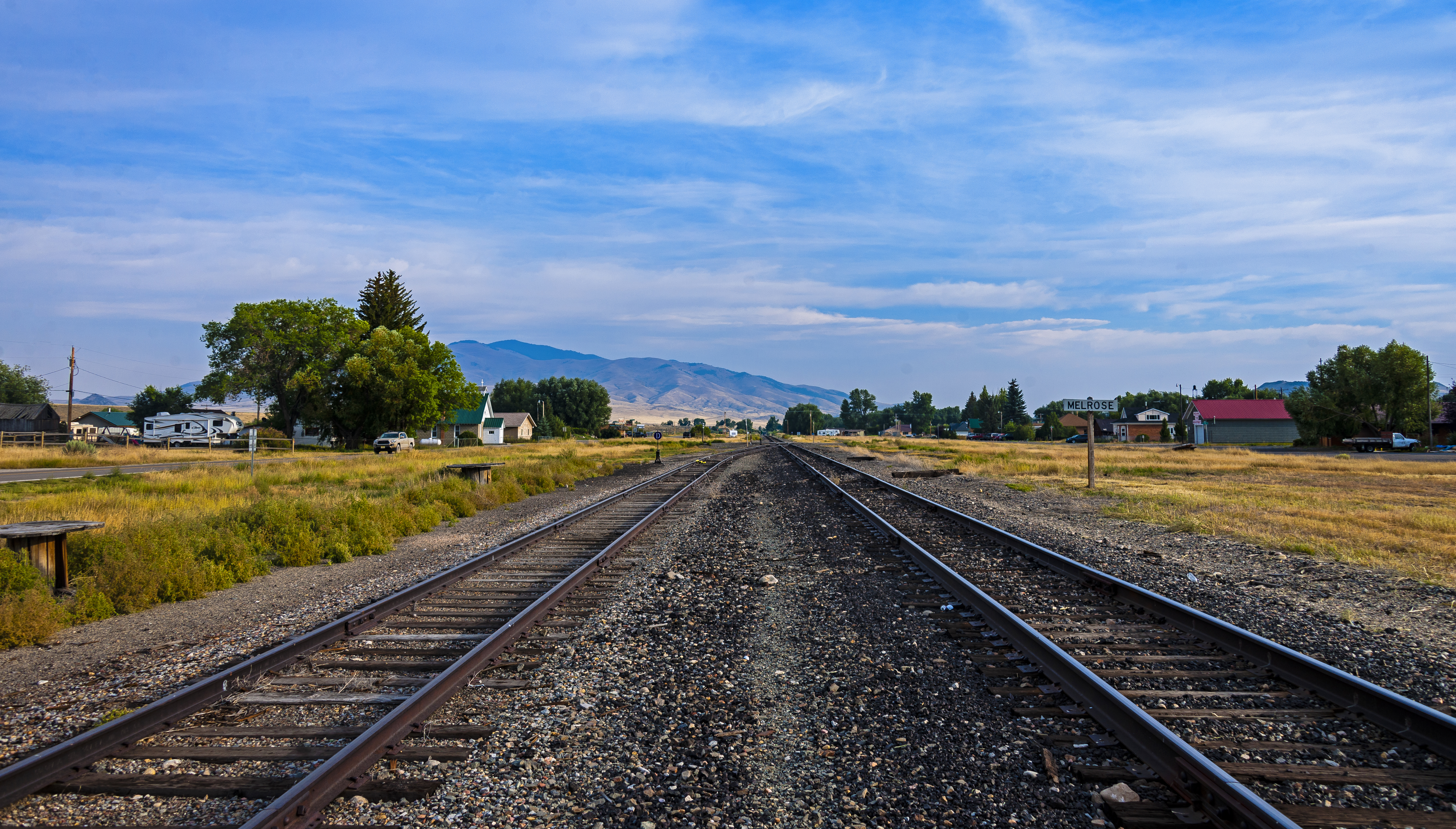
Melrose

Melrose is a small community in Silver Bow County, Montana, United States. It is 34 miles (55 km) south of Butte and about 30 miles (48 km) north of Dillon. The zip code is 59743.

It was established in 1881 at the junction of the road from Corinne, Utah, and the smelter at Glendale. Situated on a scenic stretch of the Big Hole River, Melrose today is famous for trout fishing.

It is located in the Beaverhead–Deerlodge National Forest.

== Climate ==
According to the Köppen Climate Classification system, Melrose has a semi-arid climate, abbreviated "BSk" on climate maps.
