= Twin Bridges, Montana =

- Town
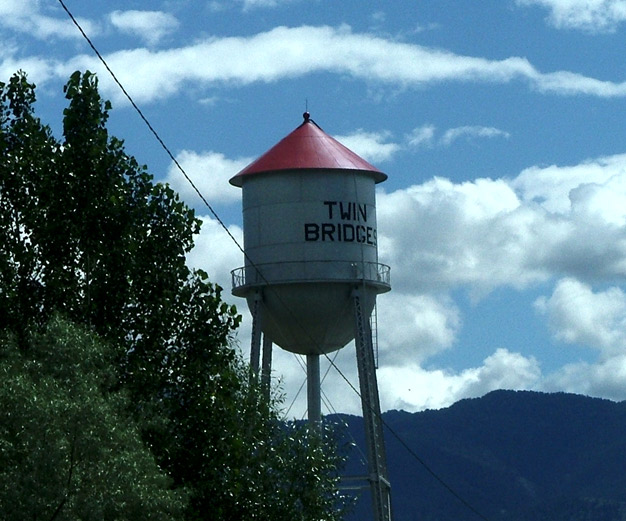
- Welcoming water tower from a ranch road

- Location in Madison County and the state of Montana
- Coordinates: 45°32′34″N 112°20′03″W
- Country: United States
- State: Montana
- County: Madison

Government
  - Type: Council-Mayor

Area
  - Total: 1.02 sq mi (2.63 km^{2})
  - Land: 1.02 sq mi (2.63 km^{2})
  - Water: 0 sq mi (0.00 km^{2})
- Elevation: 4,626 ft (1,410 m)

Population (2020)
  - Total: 330
  - Density: 325.3/sq mi (125.61/km^{2})
- Time zone: UTC-7 (Mountain Time Zone)
  - Summer (DST): UTC-6 (Mountain Daylight Time)
- ZIP code: 59754
- Area code: 406
- FIPS code: 30-75475
- GNIS feature ID: 2413407
- Website: twinbridgesmt.com

Twin Bridges is a town in Madison County, Montana, United States. It lies at the confluence of the Ruby, Beaverhead and Big Hole rivers which form the Jefferson River. Twin Bridges is a well-known fly fishing mecca for trout anglers. The population was 330 at the 2020 census.

== History ==
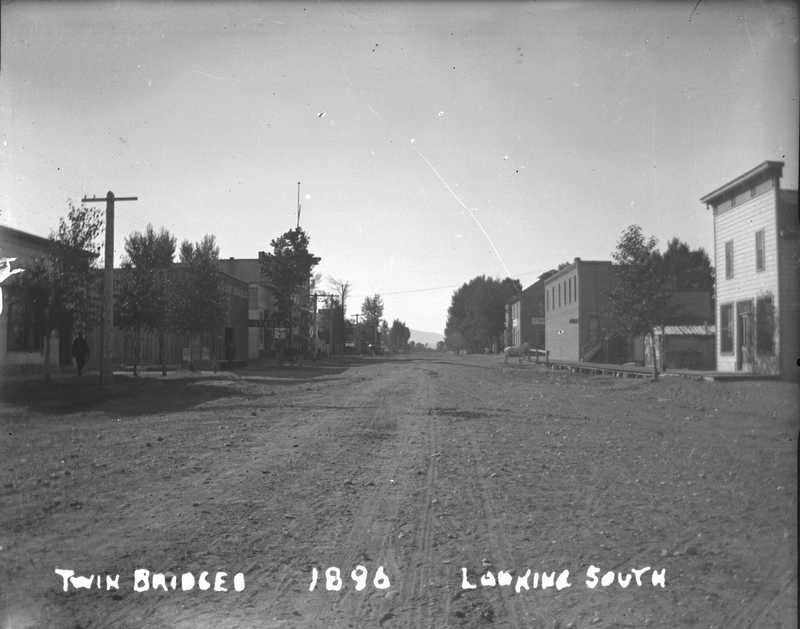
Looking South down Main Street in Twin Bridges, Montana 1896

Four Indian trails came together at a bend of the Beaverhead River north of the present school building in Twin Bridges. These trails were used by early settlers and freight companies, and helped to establish where the community of Twin Bridges would develop. Judge M.H. Lott came to Montana in 1862, and with his brother John T. Lott settled in the Ruby Valley in 1864. In 1865 they built a bridge across the Beaverhead River, and later built another bridge across the Beaverhead at the Point of Rocks. The Lott brothers continued development of roads and promoted settlement of the town, which was incorporated in 1902, with M.H. Lott as the first mayor.

== Geography ==
Twin Bridges is in northwestern Madison County. It is 9 miles (14 km) northwest of Sheridan, 27 miles (43 km) south-southwest of Whitehall and Interstate 90, and 28 miles (45 km) northeast of Dillon. According to the U.S. Census Bureau, the town has a total area of 1.01 square miles (2.62 km^{2}), all of it recorded as land. The Beaverhead River passes through the center of the town limits, while the Big Hole River passes 1 mile (1.6 km) to the west and joins the Beaverhead a mile north of the town to form the Jefferson River. The Ruby River joins the Beaverhead less than 2 miles (3 km) south of the town.

=== Climate ===
According to the Köppen Climate Classification system, Twin Bridges has a semi-arid climate, abbreviated "BSk" on climate maps.

Climate data for Twin Bridges, Montana (1991–2020 normals, extremes 1955–present)
Month	Jan	Feb	Mar	Apr	May	Jun	Jul	Aug	Sep	Oct	Nov	Dec	Year
Record high °F (°C)	62 (17)	65 (18)	78 (26)	86 (30)	93 (34)	99 (37)	101 (38)	101 (38)	98 (37)	87 (31)	73 (23)	68 (20)	101 (38)
Mean daily maximum °F (°C)	35.4 (1.9)	39.6 (4.2)	49.2 (9.6)	57.0 (13.9)	66.4 (19.1)	74.7 (23.7)	84.7 (29.3)	83.4 (28.6)	73.5 (23.1)	59.3 (15.2)	44.1 (6.7)	34.5 (1.4)	58.5 (14.7)
Daily mean °F (°C)	24.2 (−4.3)	27.3 (−2.6)	35.5 (1.9)	42.5 (5.8)	51.3 (10.7)	58.7 (14.8)	65.4 (18.6)	63.3 (17.4)	55.1 (12.8)	43.6 (6.4)	31.7 (−0.2)	23.3 (−4.8)	43.5 (6.4)
Mean daily minimum °F (°C)	13.0 (−10.6)	15.1 (−9.4)	21.9 (−5.6)	28.0 (−2.2)	36.1 (2.3)	42.7 (5.9)	46.1 (7.8)	43.2 (6.2)	36.7 (2.6)	27.9 (−2.3)	19.3 (−7.1)	12.0 (−11.1)	28.5 (−1.9)
Record low °F (°C)	−39 (−39)	−32 (−36)	−28 (−33)	2 (−17)	12 (−11)	24 (−4)	28 (−2)	23 (−5)	10 (−12)	−9 (−23)	−27 (−33)	−35 (−37)	−39 (−39)
Average precipitation inches (mm)	0.22 (5.6)	0.22 (5.6)	0.37 (9.4)	0.85 (22)	1.70 (43)	2.17 (55)	0.89 (23)	0.75 (19)	0.88 (22)	0.73 (19)	0.33 (8.4)	0.33 (8.4)	9.44 (240)
Average precipitation days (≥ 0.01 in)	3.4	3.9	4.8	8.4	11.0	11.7	6.4	6.6	5.5	5.9	4.8	5.1	77.5
Source: NOAA

== Demographics ==
Historical population
Census	Pop.	Note	%±
1910	491		—
1920	755		53.8%
1930	671		−11.1%
1940	534		−20.4%
1950	497		−6.9%
1960	509		2.4%
1970	613		20.4%
1980	437		−28.7%
1990	374		−14.4%
2000	400		7.0%
2010	375		−6.2%
2020	330		−12.0%
U.S. Decennial Census

=== 2010 census ===
As of the census of 2010, there were 375 people, 172 households, and 94 families living in the town. The population density was 390.6 inhabitants per square mile (150.8/km^{2}). There were 206 housing units at an average density of 214.6 per square mile (82.9/km^{2}). The racial makeup of the town was 96.0% White, 0.5% African American, 0.5% Native American, 0.8% from other races, and 2.1% from two or more races. Hispanic or Latino of any race were 2.9% of the population.

There were 172 households, of which 25.0% had children under the age of 18 living with them, 42.4% were married couples living together, 7.0% had a female householder with no husband present, 5.2% had a male householder with no wife present, and 45.3% were non-families. 37.2% of all households were made up of individuals, and 18% had someone living alone who was 65 years of age or older. The average household size was 2.18 and the average family size was 2.91.

The median age in the town was 44.6 years. 22.7% of residents were under the age of 18; 5.1% were between the ages of 18 and 24; 22.6% were from 25 to 44; 30.7% were from 45 to 64; and 18.9% were 65 years of age or older. The gender makeup of the town was 54.7% male and 45.3% female.

=== 2000 census ===
As of the census of 2000, there were 400 people, 175 households, and 105 families living in the town. The population density was 419.5 inhabitants per square mile (162.0/km^{2}). There were 216 housing units at an average density of 226.5 per square mile (87.5/km^{2}). The racial makeup of the town was 97.75% White, 0.25% Asian, and 2.00% from two or more races. Hispanic or Latino of any race were 0.50% of the population.

There were 175 households, out of which 25.7% had children under the age of 18 living with them, 50.3% were married couples living together, 6.9% had a female householder with no husband present, and 40.0% were non-families. 34.9% of all households were made up of individuals, and 13.7% had someone living alone who was 65 years of age or older. The average household size was 2.29 and the average family size was 2.95.

In the town, the population was spread out, with 25.3% under the age of 18, 4.3% from 18 to 24, 24.8% from 25 to 44, 28.0% from 45 to 64, and 17.8% who were 65 years of age or older. The median age was 42 years. For every 100 females, there were 92.3 males. For every 100 females age 18 and over, there were 94.2 males.

The median income for a household in the town was $25,833, and the median income for a family was $34,688. Males had a median income of $25,417 versus $16,250 for females. The per capita income for the town was $13,171. About 6.2% of families and 8.5% of the population were below the poverty line, including 4.4% of those under age 18 and 10.6% of those age 65 or over.

== Economy ==
Twin Bridges serves as a tourist destination for fly fishers and cyclists. The town sits on two long-distance cycling trails - the TransAmerica Trail, and the Lewis & Clark Bicycle Trail. In 2009, a "bike camp" was built in the town, and local stores started stocking basic cycling supplies.

== Arts and culture ==
The Twin Bridges Historical Association Museum, located in one of the first commercial buildings in town, displays artifacts relating to the area history. Displays include indigenous culture, pioneers, and mining and agriculture information.

The Twin Bridges Public Library has been serving the community since 1897. It was created by the Temperance Society as an alternative to saloons.

The Doncaster Round Barn is a three-story round barn that is listed on the National Register of Historic Places. The property was used for horse-breeding and produced Spokane, the winner of the 1889 Kentucky Derby.

== Education ==
The town is in the Twin Bridges K-12 Schools school district. Both Sheridan elementary and high school districts are components of Sheridan Public Schools. The Twin Bridges Public Schools school district educates students from kindergarten through 12th grade. The Twin Bridges Public Library serves the area.

== Media ==
The Madisonian is a newspaper serving the Madison and Ruby Valleys, which includes Twin Bridges. It is printed weekly and offers an e-edition.

== Infrastructure ==
Ruby Valley Field is a public use airport located 2 miles (3 km) southeast of town.

Montana Highway 287 and Montana Highway 41 intersect in town.

== Notable people and animals ==
- Angela McLean, lieutenant governor of Montana
- Hamilton James, Co-Chair of the Board of Trustees of the Metropolitan Museum in New York
- Benny Reynolds, rodeo champion
- Donald Rumsfeld, American political figure and businessman
- Spokane, winner of the 1889 Kentucky Derby
- Kenneth Walsh, member of the Montana House of Representatives

== See also ==
- The Round Barn at Twin Bridges, once described as a "swank hotel for horses," is on the National Register of Historic Places.

== Gallery ==
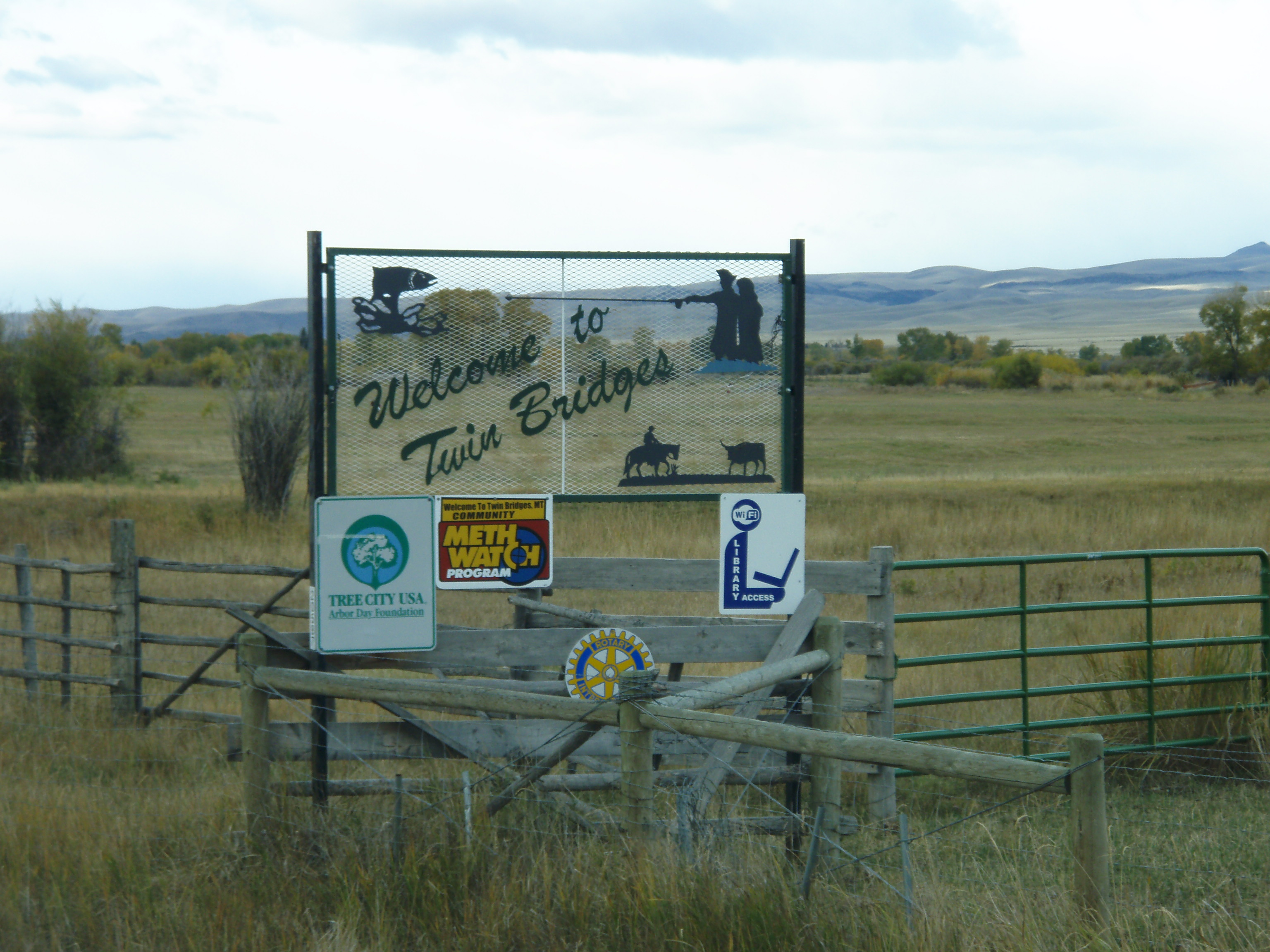
Northern Entrance To Twin Bridges, MT

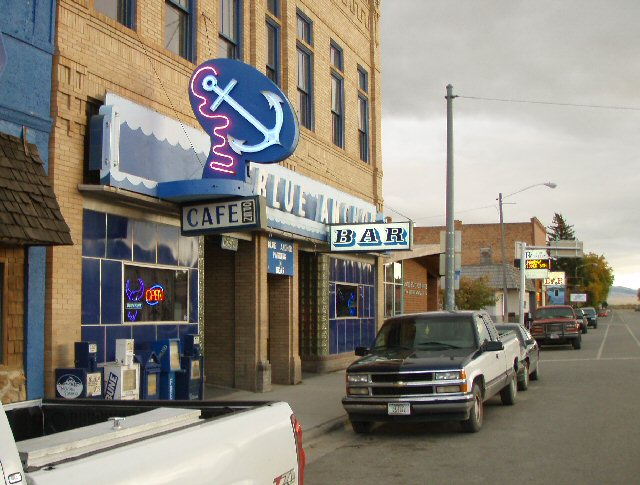
Blue Anchor Cafe, Main Street, Twin Bridges, MT
