= Proctor Knott (horse) =

American Thoroughbred racehorse

- Sire: Luke Blackburn
- Dam: Tallapaloosa
- Damsire: Great Tom
- Sex: Gelding
- Foaled: 1886
- Country: United States
- Color: Chestnut
- Breeder: Belle Meade Stud
- Owner: George W. Scoogan & Samuel W. Bryant
- Trainer: Samuel W. Bryant
- Record: 26:11-6-4
- Earnings: $80,350

Major wins
- Alexander Stakes (1888); Equity Stakes (1888); Futurity Stakes (1888); Junior Champion Stakes (1888); Kenwood Stakes (1888); West Side Stakes (1888); Sheridan Stakes (1889)

Awards
- American Champion Two-Year-Old Colt (1888)

Proctor Knott (foaled 12 April 1886 in Tennessee) was an American Thoroughbred racehorse gelding. His sire was the Hall of Famer Luke Blackburn, and his dam Tallapaloosa. He was bred by Belle Meade Stud and like his father, who had been named for the then-current governor of Kentucky, he was named for Governor J. Proctor Knott. He was owned during his racing career by George Scoogan and Sam Bryant, who purchased him at auction for $450.

== Racing career ==
Trained by co-owner, Captain Samuel W. Bryant, Proctor Knott had a career racing record of 26 starts, 11 wins, 6 seconds and 4 thirds, earning $80,350.

In 1888, as a juvenile, he won the Alexander Stakes at Churchill Downs in Louisville, Kentucky. Returning north, Proctor Knott won the Junior Champion Stakes for which he earned $20,935, the richest offered by Monmouth Park Racetrack.

By far his most important win came in the inaugural running of Futurity Stakes at Sheepshead Bay Race Track. The winner's share of the purse was the enormous amount of $50,000 at a time when the 1888 Kentucky Derby winner earned $4,740 and the 1888 Belmont Stakes winner $3,440. An estimated crowd of 40,000 were on hand for the race. In this race he defeated Salvator.

Proctor Knott is listed by Thoroughbred Heritage as American Champion Two-Year-Old Male Horse of 1888.

During his three-year-old campaign, he entered the Kentucky Derby as the 1-2 favorite against a horse he will soon be well acquainted with, Spokane. Proctor Knott false started twice, ran off and almost unseated his rider, according to the official comments, then raced wide and lost in a contested finish when the judges put the nose win in Spokane's favor.

The pair met again a few days later in the Clark Handicap at Churchill Downs, with Spokane this time winning by three lengths.

The American Derby would mark the third meeting of the two, competing for more than $15,400 with a crowd of over 30,000 on hand at Washington Park in Chicago. Once again, after leading for much of the race Proctor Knott could not hold off the late closing move of Spokane in the stretch.

Finally, Proctor Knott got a win over Spokane by two lengths on the July 4th Sheridan Stakes at Washington Park in front of a crowd of 20,000 while carrying 10lbs less than his rival.

He also ran second in the Omnibus Stakes at Monmouth Park on August 13, behind Longstreet, the 1891 American Horse of the Year and son of the great Longfellow. He beat his other common foe, Salvator in the race.

== Proctor Knott vs. Salvator ==
Salvator, a member of the National Museum of Racing and Hall of Fame, never defeated Proctor Knott. In Salvator's first start, the Junior Champion Stakes at Monmouth Park Racetrack, Proctor Knott won while Salvator came in third. Three weeks later, their rivalry was renewed in the Futurity, where Proctor Knott again won. After this race, Proctor Knott was given time off, while Salvator continued to race and won four more stakes.

Their next and final meeting was in the Omnibus Stakes in 1889. While neither of them won, Proctor Knott placed ahead of Salvator. Salvator never lost again in seven more races, while Proctor Knott won only two of his final nine races.

== Legacy ==
Proctor Knott died on the morning of August 6, 1891. The Proctor Knott Handicap was won in 1921 by Black Servant, a son of Black Toney. The race was conducted at Churchill Downs between 1920 and 1921.
