= 1894 Kentucky Derby =

Horse race

20th Kentucky Derby
- Kentucky Derby
- Grade I stakes race
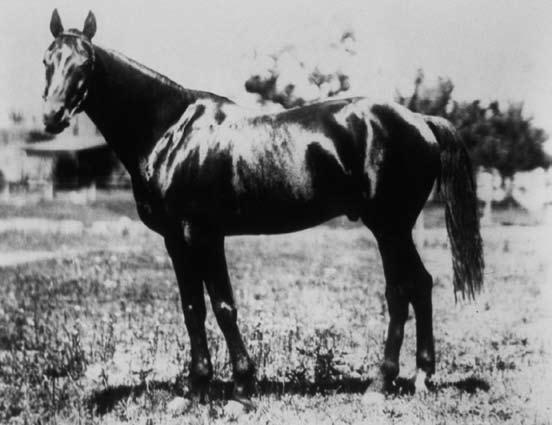
- 1894 Kentucky Derby winner Chant
- Location: Churchill Downs
- Date: May 15, 1894
- Winning horse: Chant
- Jockey: Frank Goodale
- Trainer: H. Eugene Leigh
- Owner: Leigh & Rose
- Surface: Dirt

The 1894 Kentucky Derby was the 20th running of the Kentucky Derby. The race took place on May 15, 1894.

== Full results ==
Finished	Post	Horse	Jockey	Trainer	Owner	Time / behind
1st	5	Chant	Frank Goodale	H. Eugene Leigh	H. Eugene Leigh & Robert L. Rose	2:41.00
2nd	2	Pearl Song	Robert "Tiny" Williams		Charles H. Smith	6
3rd	1	Sigurd	Monk Overton		Bashford Manor Stable	10
4th	3	Al Boyer	Harry Ray		Anderson & Gooding	15
5th	4	Tom Elmore	James Irving		S. K. Hughes & Co.	

- Winning Breeder: H. Eugene Leigh & Robert L. Rose; (KY)

== Payout ==
- The winner received a purse of $4,020.
- Second place received $300.
- Third place received $150.
- Fourth place received $100.
