= Ten Broeck–Mollie McCarty match race =

American thoroughbred match race

The Ten Broek–Mollie McCarty match race was a match race on July 4, 1878, between Ten Broeck, a stallion from Kentucky, and Mollie McCarty, a mare from California. The race was held at the Louisville Jockey Club (now Churchill Downs) in front of a record crowd of 30,000. Both horses were champions of the period, and the win by Ten Broeck marked the first loss of Mollie McCarty's career. Ten Broek was ridden to victory by African-American jockey Billy Walker, one of Kentucky's leading riders of his day.

The race was immortalized in the folk song, Molly and Tenbrooks.
