= Hecla, Montana =

Coordinates: 45°36′20″N 112°55′53″W

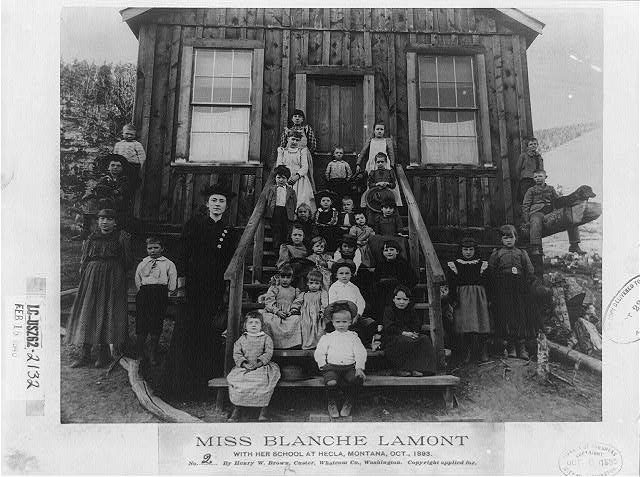
Blanche Lamont with her students, Hecla, Montana, 1893

Hecla was a town in Beaverhead County, Montana, United States. It has been designated as a ghost town, with only a few ruined buildings remaining. It was notable at one time as the home of Blanche Lamont, who taught at Hecla's one-room schoolhouse. Lamont would become the first of two murder victims of Theodore Durrant. Margaret Brown also lived there for a time.

The Hecla Mining District was "on the side of Lion Mountain, and was also referred to as the Glendale and/or Bryant Mining District, which was strung out along ten miles of gulches, the four towns included Trapper City, Lion City, Glendale, and Hecla."

In 1881, the Hecla Company reorganized and came under the direction of Henry Knippenberg. Shortly after he assumed control, Knippenberg had the town of Hecla built a mile away from Lion City ... Transportation from the mine was improved with the construction of a four mile-long, narrow-gauge tramway from Hecla to the mill.

The town of Hecla grew to some 1,500 to 1,800 persons, with a water works system, fire protection, a church, a school for 200 pupils, and other businesses typical of a small mining camp.

The General Merchandise operations in Hecla, run by H.W. Kappes, were "absorbed by the Hecla Mercantile & Banking Company in 1886. The Hecla Mercantile was a subsidiary of the Hecla Consolidated Mining Company based out of Glendale, Montana." The only remaining structure in Hecla is Hecla House. The log building built in 1881 was listed on the National Register of Historic Places in 2005.

The Canyon Creek Charcoal Kilns are still standing, though in various states of decay. They were built in 1881 and used continuously until the Glendale smelter closed in 1900. The kilns produced charcoal to fuel the silver smelter. The conical structures are 22 feet high and have a 24 foot exterior diameter.

The area "was hard hit when the Sherman Silver Purchase Act was repealed in 1893."

"The district can be reached from I-15 near Melrose at Exit 93 on Trapper Creek Road. Glendale is about five miles and Lion City and Hecla, another 7 miles or so. A four wheel drive or ATV is recommended."
