= National Register of Historic Places listings in Madison County, Montana =

Location of Madison County in Montana

This is a list of the National Register of Historic Places listings in Madison County, Montana. It is intended to be a complete list of the properties and districts on the National Register of Historic Places in Madison County, Montana, United States. The locations of National Register properties and districts for which the latitude and longitude coordinates are included below, may be seen in a map.

There are 18 properties and districts listed on the National Register in the county, including 1 National Historic Landmark.

This National Park Service list is complete through NPS recent listings posted May 1, 2026.

== Listings county-wide ==
	Name on the Register	Image	Date listed	Location	City or town	Description
1	Beaverhead Rock-Lewis and Clark Expedition	Beaverhead Rock-Lewis and Clark Expedition	February 11, 1970 (#70000359)	About 14 miles northeast of Dillon; 45°23′18″N 112°27′29″W	Dillon	
2	Dr. Don L. Byam House	Dr. Don L. Byam House	March 1, 2002 (#02000103)	Main St. 45°18′27″N 111°58′04″W	Nevada City	
3	Christ Episcopal Church and Rectory	Christ Episcopal Church and Rectory	January 22, 1987 (#86003672)	304 S. Main St. 45°27′13″N 112°11′45″W	Sheridan	
4	Doncaster Round Barn	Doncaster Round Barn	April 14, 2015 (#15000150)	Riverside Dr. 45°34′12″N 112°18′49″W	Twin Bridges vicinity	
5	Ferris-Hermsmeyer-Fenton Ranch	Ferris-Hermsmeyer-Fenton Ranch	January 9, 2008 (#07001364)	144 Duncan District Rd. 45°26′59″N 112°14′03″W	Sheridan	Ranch established by Jane Ferris, a widow, in 1872.
6	Finney House	Finney House	March 1, 2002 (#02000104)	Junction of Main and California Sts. 45°18′28″N 111°58′05″W	Nevada City	
7	Hutchins Bridge	Hutchins Bridge	March 18, 1999 (#99000344)	across the Madison River; 44°53′19″N 111°34′50″W	Cameron vicinity	Triple-span Pratt through truss bridge built in 1902.
8	Madison County Fairgrounds	Madison County Fairgrounds	August 3, 1984 (#84002500)	Montana Highway 41; 45°32′31″N 112°20′08″W	Twin Bridges	
9	William O'Brien House	William O'Brien House	October 23, 1986 (#86002933)	114 E. Poppleton; 45°27′16″N 112°11′40″W	Sheridan	
10	Pony Historic District	Pony Historic District	August 4, 1987 (#87001264)	Community of Pony, southwest of Harrison; 45°39′25″N 111°53′50″W	Pony	
11	Powder House	Powder House	August 3, 1987 (#87001266)	½ mile southeast of Pony on Potosi Rd. 45°39′22″N 111°52′33″W	Pony	
12	Robbers Roost	Robbers Roost	January 1, 1976 (#76001124)	5 miles north of Alder at Montana Highway 287; 45°23′33″N 112°08′49″W	Alder	
13	H.D. Rossiter Building	H.D. Rossiter Building	March 7, 1994 (#94000138)	115 S. Main St. 45°27′21″N 112°11′46″W	Sheridan	
14	Saint Mary of the Assumption	Saint Mary of the Assumption	October 24, 1985 (#85003380)	Off Montana Highway 287; 45°21′15″N 112°07′15″W	Laurin	
15	Strawberry Mine Historic District		August 4, 1987 (#87001265)	Roughly bounded by Strawberry Ridge, Pony Rd., and Pony Creek; 45°39′50″N 111°56′14″W	Pony	
16	Thexton Ranch		May 12, 2006 (#06000426)	335 Varney Rd. 45°16′53″N 111°45′44″W	Ennis	
17	Union City	Union City	February 26, 1999 (#99000261)	Southeast of Virginia City; 45°12′30″N 111°56′03″W	Virginia City	An abandoned mining camp
18	Virginia City Historic District	Virginia City Historic District	October 15, 1966 (#66000435)	Wallace St. 45°17′27″N 111°56′35″W	Virginia City	

== See also ==
- List of National Historic Landmarks in Montana
- National Register of Historic Places listings in Montana
