= Montana Highway 287 =

State highway in Montana

Montana Highway 287
- MT 287 highlighted in red

Route information
- Maintained by MDT
- Length: 42.822 mi (68.915 km)

Major junctions
- West end: MT 41 in Twin Bridges
- East end: US 287 in Ennis

Location
- Country: United States
- State: Montana
- Counties: Madison

Highway system
- Montana Highway System; Interstate; US; State; Secondary
← US 287	→ US 310

Montana Highway 287 (MT 287) is a state highway in the U.S. state of Montana. The highway runs 42.822 miles (68.915 km) from MT 41 in Twin Bridges east to U.S. Route 287 (US 287) in Ennis. MT 287 is the primary east–west highway of Madison County. The highway connects the county's four towns, including Sheridan and the county seat of Virginia City. The course of MT 287 follows the ultimate portions of two trails that met in Virginia City, the center of the Alder Gulch gold rush of the mid-1860s and the second territorial capital of Montana. Parts of the highway were improved from rudimentary roads around 1920 from Virginia City to Ennis. This connection became the first portion of Montana Highway 34 in the early 1930s; the highway was extended west to Twin Bridges in the late 1930s. MT 34 was reconstructed from Twin Bridges through Alder to Virginia City in the late 1930s and early 1940s and between Virginia City and Ennis in the late 1940s to mid-1950s. The MT 287 designation was first applied to a cross-state route from West Yellowstone to Canada in the late 1950s. The highway was rerouted in place of MT 34 in the early 1960s. MT 287 was replaced by US 287 along much of the cross-state corridor in the mid-1960s. The highway extended north of Twin Bridges to Whitehall until the late 1970s, when it achieved its current length.

== Route description ==
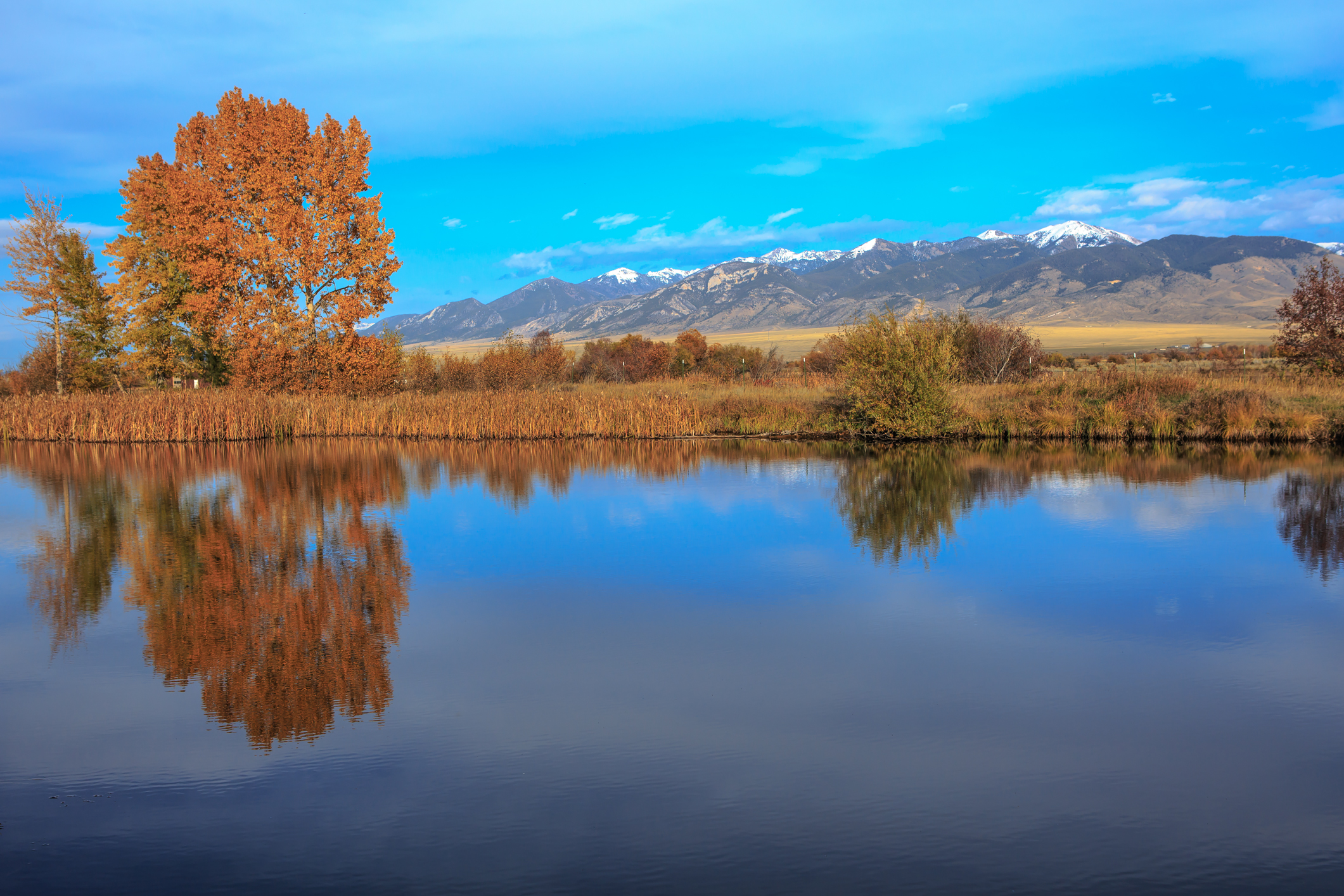
Fall colors along MT 287 in October 2013

MT 287 begins at a T-intersection with MT 41 in the town of Twin Bridges. MT 41 heads west along Fourth Street to cross the Beaverhead River and north along Main Street. MT 287 heads south on Main Street and veers southeast out of the town. The two-lane highway parallels an inactive Montana Rail Link line through the valley of the Ruby River between the Ruby Range to the southwest and the Tobacco Root Mountains to the northeast. MT 287 follows Main Street through the town of Sheridan, where the route passes the H.D. Rossiter Building, Christ Episcopal Church and Rectory, and the William O'Brien House. The highway passes by the Robbers Roost and to the west of St. Mary of the Assumption Church in the hamlet of Laurin before reaching the southern end of the rail line in the unincorporated village of Alder, through which the highway follows Main Street and meets the northern end of Upper Ruby Road, which is designated Secondary Highway 357 (S-357).

In Alder, MT 287 leaves the valley of the Ruby River and heads east through Alder Gulch, a narrow valley along which the highway ascends the more moderate mountains between the Tobacco Root Mountains to the north and the Gravelly Range to the south. The length of the valley is filled with tailings, or small hills of mining waste left behind by gold dredge placer mining over decades of mining. The highway passes through the village of Nevada City, the site of the Finney House and the Dr. Don L. Byam House. MT 287 follows the Alder Gulch Short Line Railroad, an isolated narrow-gauge railway, until the route reaches Virginia City. The highway enters the town on Nevada Street but mainly follows Wallace Street through the Virginia City Historic District, a National Historic Landmark preserving buildings of Montana's second territorial capital. MT 287 leaves Virginia City and ascends to its highest point along Daylight Creek. The highway descends into the valley of the Madison River along Eightmile Creek. MT 287 meets the northern end of S-249 (Varney Road) where the highway curves north on arriving at the Madison River. The highway enters the town of Ennis along Bauer Lane and curves east onto West Main Street before reaching its eastern terminus at US 287, which heads north and east along Main Street.

== History ==
The corridor through which MT 287 passes was part of two migration routes along which settlers rushed to attempt to make their fortunes during the Alder Gulch gold rush that started in 1863. Virginia City was the target of both routes; the new town became the second capital of the Montana Territory in 1865. Settlers from the east followed the Bozeman Trail through Wyoming and eastern Montana, including the namesake city, and settlers from the south used the Virginia City branch of the Montana Trail from Utah and Idaho. After 10 years, the initial gold boom had ended, and the territorial capital moved to Helena in 1875. A second period of gold extraction came at the turn of the 20th century, when mechanical gold dredges arrived to tear up Alder Gulch to gather more gold. Gold dredge placer mining and some lode mining formed the basis of the area's economy until the gold ore was mostly exhausted; the dredge tailings along Alder Gulch remain a visible reminder of the area's mining past.

No part of the Twin Bridges–Ennis highway was included in the initial state highway system approved October 9, 1922, and called the Seven Percent System, named as such because 7 percent of a state's highway system was eligible for federal aid through the Federal Aid Highway Act of 1921. Virginia City was one of three county seats not connected in the initial 18-route system. However, the Montana State Highway Commission contracted with Madison County to construct 6.62 miles (10.65 km) of gravel road and 3.22 miles (5.18 km) of graded road along the Virginia City–Ennis highway between 1919 and 1921. The Virginia City–Ennis road was added to the federal aid highway system and designated State Route No. 29 on May 6, 1930. Montana starting signing non–U.S. Highway routes in 1931, and by 1935 the highway between the two towns was marked as MT 34. By 1933, the Virginia City–Ennis highway was gravel for 10 miles (16 km) east from Virginia City and was only graded the remaining 5 miles (8.0 km) to Ennis. The highway from Twin Bridges to Virginia City remained an unimproved dirt road. However, by 1936, that highway was brought into the primary highway system. Between 1937 and 1938, MT 34 was graded and graveled from Twin Bridges to Virginia City.

MT 34 was reconstructed—and in many places relocated—and paved starting from the Twin Bridges end. The highway was reconstructed from that town to Sheridan in 1939. The reconstructed highway was removed from Middle Road and Tuke Lane to its present course between the two towns. MT 34 was reconstructed from Sheridan to Laurin in 1940. The reconstructed highway bypassed Bivens Creek Road and for the first time served Laurin directly. Two years later, MT 34 was placed on its modern alignment south through Alder and east through the dredge tailings. The new highway replaced Ruby Road, which bypasses Alder, and another road that bypassed the tailings by following the edge of the valley closer to Alder Creek. MT 34 was reconstructed on or very close to the old road through Alder Gulch to the east end of Virginia City in 1945. Improvements from the Ennis end of the highway began in 1948 when the highway from Ennis west to Old Virginia City Highway in the valley was graveled. Two years later, that stretch was reconstructed and paved. In 1951, MT 34 was placed on its present course west to the highway's summit, which bypassed Old Virginia City Highway. Finally, the modern highway from Twin Bridges to Ennis was completed when the route from Virginia City to the summit was reconstructed and paved in 1956.

The Montana State Highway Commission first assigned the MT 287 designation in 1958 to a cross-state route from Yellowstone National Park at West Yellowstone to the Canada–United States border at the Piegan–Carway Border Crossing between Babb and Cardston, Alberta. MT 287 ran concurrently with US 191 for 8 miles (13 km) north from West Yellowstone and replaced MT 1 from US 191 to US 10S near Sappington. The route joined US 10S—along the modern Interstate 90 (I-90) corridor—to its junction with US 10 and US 10N near Three Forks. MT 287 continued with US 10N north and west to Helena, then the route ran concurrently with US 91 (along the modern I-15 corridor) to Wolf Creek. MT 287 replaced MT 33 between Wolf Creek and Choteau, then the highway ran concurrently with US 89 through Browning to Canada. After the Hebgen Lake earthquake in 1959, which destroyed part of the highway along that lake and created Quake Lake, MT 287 was temporarily rerouted to the highway north from Raynolds Pass.

In 1961, MT 287 was rerouted again. The highway replaced MT 34 from Ennis to Twin Bridges, ran concurrently with MT 41 to north of Silver Star, and replaced S-401 north to US 10 at Whitehall. MT 287 continued east with US 10 to rejoin its previous route west of Three Forks. The portion of the highway between Ennis and the US 10 junction became MT 287A. The next major change came in 1965, when US 287 was placed on its present course from West Yellowstone to Choteau. The Raynolds Pass road became MT 50 (now MT 87), and MT 287 was removed from its 1961 course south of Ennis and north of Whitehall. The highway's final extension was north from US 10 to I-90 in Whitehall in 1966 when the Interstate Highway was completed through the area. MT 287 attained its current length when it was truncated at Twin Bridges in 1977. The portion of the highway from Silver Star to Whitehall became MT 55. MT 287 was resurfaced from Twin Bridges to Sheridan in 2000, near Ennis in 2007, from west of Ennis through Virginia City to Alder in 2008, and from Alder to Sheridan in 2009.

== Major intersections ==
The entire route is in Madison County.

Location	mi	km	Destinations	Notes
Twin Bridges	0.000	0.000	MT 41 (Main Street / Fourth Avenue) – Dillon, Whitehall	Western terminus
Alder	19.611	31.561	S-357 south (Upper Ruby Road) – Ruby Dam	
	41.000	65.983	S-249 south (Varney Road)	
Ennis	42.822	68.915	US 287 (Main Street) – West Yellowstone, Norris	Eastern terminus
1.000 mi = 1.609 km; 1.000 km = 0.621 mi

== See also ==
- List of state highways in Montana
