= Harry Dahlberg =

American football player & coach (1896–1971)

Harry "Swede" Dahlberg Sr. (July 2, 1896 - June 1, 1971) was an American college football player and high school coach, teacher and athletic director. He was a high school sports coach for 45 years, 44 years at Butte High School, Butte, Montana. During his 44-year tenure his teams won 27 state championships across football, basketball, track and field and cross country.

== Playing career ==
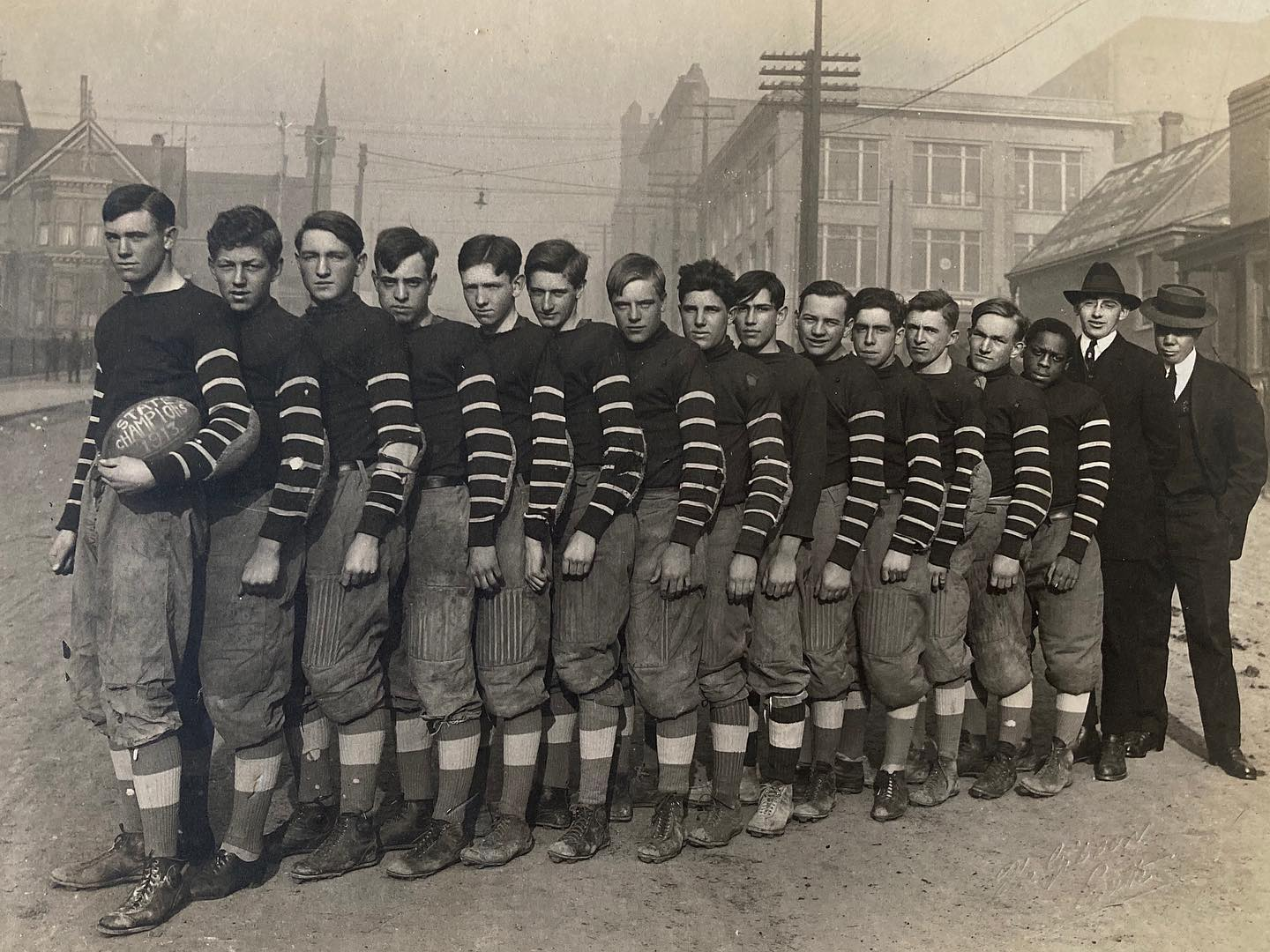
Butte High School 1913 State Football Champions. Dahlberg is pictured seventh from the left.

1913–1915 Butte, High School Position: Tackle

1916–1920 University of Montana, Missoula Position: Team Captain, and Tackle

== Coaching career ==
45 Years (1921–1966)

1921-22- Hamilton High School

1922-66 - Butte High School - Head Football, Head Basketball (‘23-’52), Head T&F, Cross Country (1964)

== Accomplishments and honors ==
27 State Championships

Football State Titles (1924, 1927, 1929, 1930, 1931, 1935, 1937, 1940 and tied in 1949 and 1950)

Basketball State Titles (1924, 1925, 1928, 1932, 1941 and 1943 (unofficial due to 1943 Bank Holiday)

Track & Field State Titles (1924, 1925, 1927, 1928, 1931, 1933, 1935, 1936, 1937, 1938, 1943, 1963, 1966)

Cross Country State Title (1965)

Montana Coaches Hall of Fame - inducted 1982

National High School Sports Hall of Fame - inducted 1986

== Early life, family and death ==
Harry William Dahlberg was born on July 2, 1896 at his parents’ home in Butte, Montana. He was the oldest of eight children born to Swedish immigrants, Gustave (Magnuson) Dahlberg and Marit (Mary) Perrson Dahlberg.

Harry, along with three other Dahlberg brothers, George, Oscar and Alfred all played for and each lettered numerous times at the Montana State University at Missoula and became known as the “Four Norsemen from Butte”.

Dahlberg lost the 1928 state football championship to his younger brother, George Dahlberg, then football coach at Custer County High School at Miles City. George went on to become basketball coach of the University of Montana Grizzlies. He was at the University from 1937 to 1955 and retired as athletic director in 1961. The university's Dahlberg Arena is named after George.

Oscar Dahlberg, another younger brother, was inducted into the Greyhound Hall of Fame as a Pioneer in 1984.

Dahlberg married Effie Elizabeth Eminger in 1926. Their son, Harry William Dahlberg Jr., was born on June 4, 1928.

He died on June 1, 1971, while fishing. He was fishing at the Ruby Reservoir, near Alder, Montana, when he was struck by a heart attack.

== High school play ==
Dahlberg discovered football in his sophomore year. He was an all-state tackle for three years. Butte High School was undefeated during those three years. He had little success at track. Dahlberg said “I tried the sport, loved it but couldn't conquer it.”

Dahlberg was named to the Montana Standard's Butte High All Century Team in 1999.

== College play ==
Dahlberg was recruited by coach Jerry Nisson (then the Montana State University at Missoula) who offered him a scholarship and work study to finance his college education. Four of his siblings, including his sister Helen, followed him in graduating from the university. He was a four-year letterman. His senior year, he was captain of the Grizzly football team that defeated the University of Washington for the only time in 1920.

He missed the 1918 season when he served in the U.S. Navy during World War I

== Coaching career ==
He coached high school sports for 45 years, 44 years at Butte High School. During his 44-year tenure his teams won 27 state championships across football, basketball, track and field and cross country. The Montana Coaches Association cited him as Montana's "winningest coach of all time." Frank Quinn, a reporter for The Montana Standard wrote “Measure his contribution just in terms of time and you have some idea of what he has given. Measure it in terms of the deep love he has had for sports, people and more particularly ‘his boys’ and you have something that few equal, let alone surpass.” Don Brunell, president of the Association of Washington Business recalled in 1999 that “my role model (growing up) was Harry “Swede” Dahlberg, a legendary coach at our high school in Butte, Montana. He was a celebrity around our town and while many folks remember him for his long list of championship teams, many more remember that he taught them to be better people. Swede simply believed that people should put more into life than they take from it. ‘Mr. Dahlberg’ as everyone called him, had strong values, he cared about young people and led by example. As my classmates and I went different directions in life we all took a little of Harry ‘Swede”’ Dahlberg with us. Swede Dahlberg led by example and in doing so, made us better people.” The Montana Standard quoted an unidentified man as saying "the 'Swede' is a great guy, he's done more for development of good citizens among the young boys of Butte than people will ever realize."

=== Record ===
In his 44 years his teams won 27 State Championships

Football State Titles (1924, 1927, 1929, 1930, 1931, 1935, 1937, 1940 and tied in 1949 and 1950)

Basketball State Titles (1924, 1925, 1928, 1932, 1941 and 1943 (unofficial due to 1943 Bank Holiday)

Track & Field State Titles (1924, 1925, 1927, 1928, 1931, 1933, 1935, 1936, 1937, 1938, 1943, 1963, 1966)

Cross Country State Title (1965)

==== Five Straight State Championships ====
Starting in the spring of 1924, Swede won his first state basketball champion, and went on to win a string of five straight state championships, winning the 1924 track title, the 1924 football crown, the 1925 basketball and track titles.

==== Going out as a champion ====
Swede loved coaching track the most, and it was that sport on which he went out a champion, winning the Montana state track title in 1966. It was the last meet before he hit the mandatory retirement age at age 70. He told a reporter at the time “old age is catching up to me, and this is the last time out.” Swede recalled later (1970) of his final win “we started the year with very little and I thought perhaps I would get that last title I want so badly, but those kids of mine came through like champions. They performed the way they knew they could -- and won the title we weren't given a chance of winning. A champion is one who can perform beyond his ability when the occasion demands it and they did it. All coaches want to retire as champions . Those kids made sure I did and that has to be my number one thrill.”

== Awards ==
- Montana Coaches Hall of Fame - inducted 1982
- National High School Sports Hall of Fame - inducted 1986
  - Inducted into the Hall of Fame in 1986, along with 17 other ‘of the most significant individuals in the history of interscholastic athletics'. Arnold D. Palmer and Jerry R. Lucas were inducted the same year.
- Dahlberg was named to the Montana Standard's Butte High All Century Team.

== Memorials ==
“Dahlberg Day” May 25, 1966

Butte's “Swede Dahlberg Invitational Track Meet” is an annual event held in Butte, Montana.

West Elementary School, Butte, Montana “Swede Dahlberg Field” is the location where his high school teams practiced named in his honor.

Swede Dahlberg Memorial Mosaic, Copper Mountain Park, Butte, MT

Harry "Swede" Dahlberg Outstanding Boy Athlete Award, given at the annual Butte High All-Sports Banquet.
