= Virginia City Historic District =

Virginia City Historic District may refer to:

- Virginia City Historic District (Virginia City, Montana), listed on the NRHP in Montana
- Virginia City Historic District (Virginia City, Nevada), listed on the NRHP in Nevada
