= Laurin, Montana =

- Unincorporated community
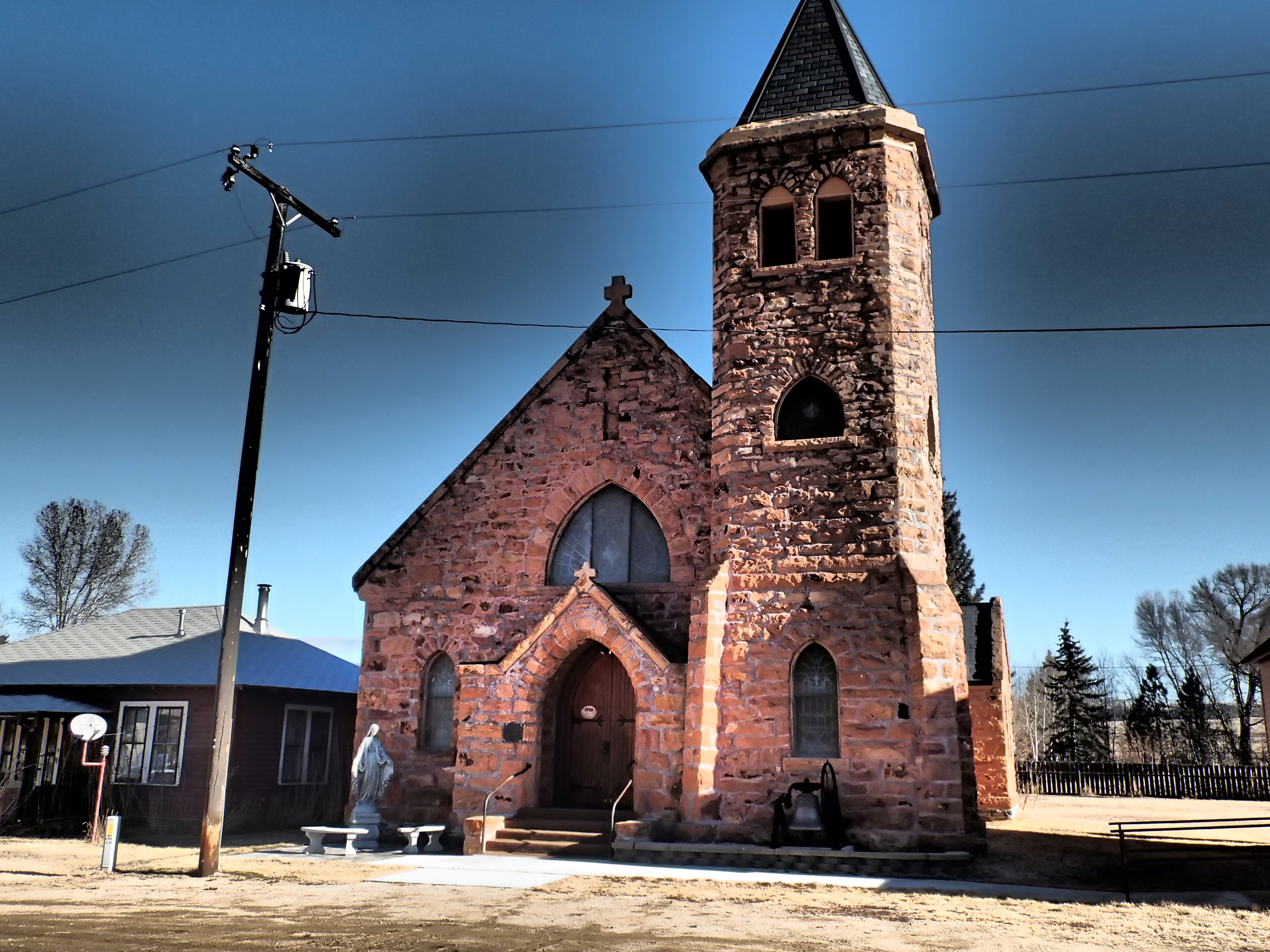
- St. Mary of the Assumption Church

- Location within Montana Location within the United States
- Coordinates: 45°21′10″N 112°7′5″W
- Country: United States
- State: Montana
- County: Madison
- Elevation: 5,066 ft (1,544 m)
- Time zone: UTC-7 (Mountain (MST))
  - Summer (DST): UTC-6 (MDT)
- Area code: 406
- GNIS feature ID: 773257

Laurin is an unincorporated community in Madison County, Montana, United States. The community is on Montana Highway 287 2 miles (3.2 km) north of Alder.

== History ==
Laurin is named for Jean Baptiste Laurin, who founded a trading post in the mid-19th century that became the site of the community. The nearby Alder Gulch gold rush of the 1860s brought thousands of miners to the area, and while most left by the end of the decade, Jean Baptiste Laurin became rich by selling general merchandise to the miners. He used his new wealth to develop the town; one of the buildings he commissioned, St. Mary of the Assumption Church, is still standing and is listed on the National Register of Historic Places.

In 1983, Laurin was described as "a small hamlet with less than twenty buildings".
