= William Ennis (Montana pioneer) =

Irish-American freighter and homesteader (1828-1898)

William Ennis (March 17, 1828 - July 4, 1898) was an Irish-born freighter and homesteader who established the town of Ennis, Montana.

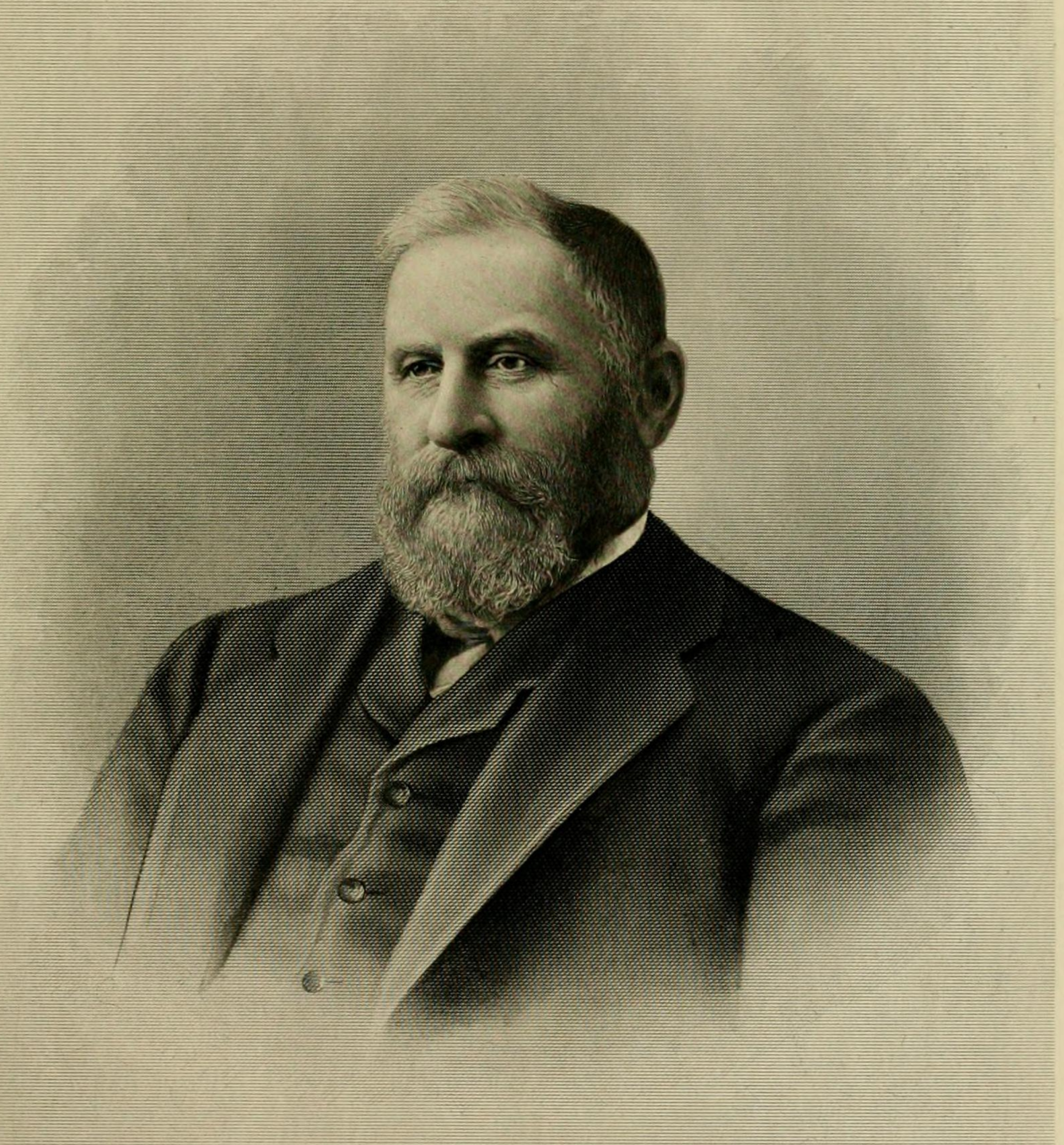
William Ennis, founder of the town of Ennis, Montana.

== Early life ==
William Ennis was born on Saint Patrick's day in 1828 near the village of Kirkistown, County Down, Ireland, the sixth of eleven children born to John and Mary Ennis, who had emigrated from Scotland to Ireland. He immigrated to the United States in 1842, arriving in Boston, later attending school in Holyoke and working as a mechanic.

== Freighter and homesteader ==
Ennis traveled west, working as a freighter in Kansas and Colorado, and later homesteaded along Montana's Madison River in 1863. He established a general store and gradually transformed the site into a permanent hub for ranching and commerce. He was made postmaster in 1881, when the Ennis Post Office was established.

== Personal life and death ==
William Ennis married Katherine Shriver, a school teacher from Iowa, on August 5, 1861, and they had two children. Ennis died on July 4, 1898, having been shot by a former friend several days earlier.
