= Ennis, Montana =

- Town
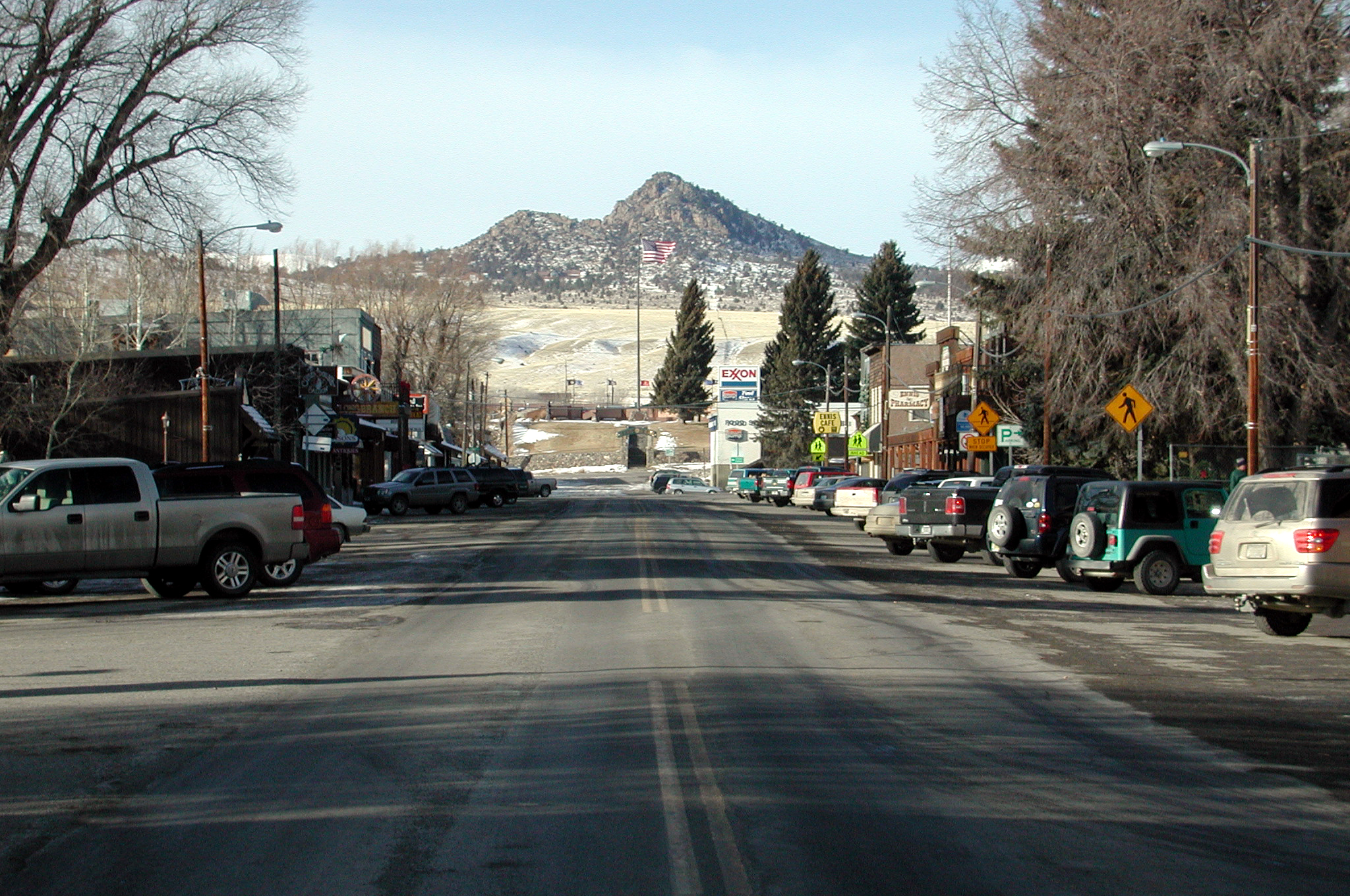
- Main Street

- Location in Madison County and the state of Montana

- Location within Montana Location within the United States
- Coordinates: 45°20′46″N 111°43′55″W
- Country: United States
- State: Montana
- County: Madison

Government
  - Mayor: Nici Haas

Area
  - Total: 0.74 sq mi (1.92 km^{2})
  - Land: 0.74 sq mi (1.91 km^{2})
  - Water: 0 sq mi (0.00 km^{2})
- Elevation: 4,961 ft (1,512 m)

Population (2020)
  - Total: 917
  - Density: 1,242.0/sq mi (479.52/km^{2})
- Time zone: UTC-7 (Mountain (MST))
  - Summer (DST): UTC-6 (MDT)
- ZIP code: 59729
- Area code: 406
- FIPS code: 30-24475
- GNIS feature ID: 2412598
- Website: www.ennismontana.org

Ennis is a town in Madison County, Montana, United States, in the southwestern part of the state. The population was 917 at the 2020 census, up from 838 in 2010.

U.S. Route 287 runs through town, following the Madison River as it descends from the town of West Yellowstone.

== History ==
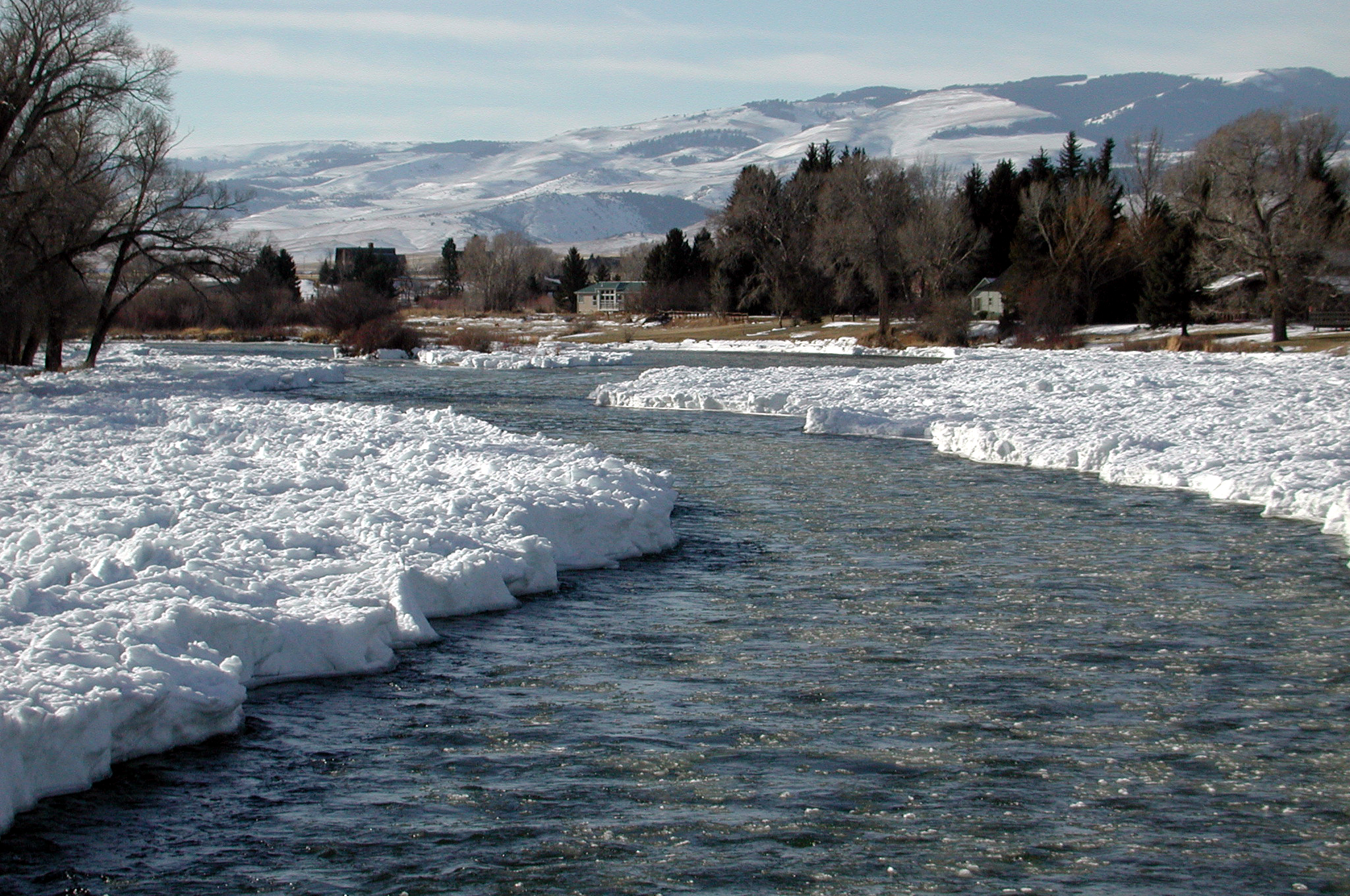
Madison River at Ennis in January

In 1863, gold was discovered in Alder Gulch. This brought on "the rush". Two months later, William Ennis homesteaded the site along the Madison River that was soon to become the town of Ennis, his namesake.

In 1886, a mystery creature was noted for making livestock kills in the Madison Valley. A local rancher, Israel Ammon Hutchins, finally shot and killed the beast, after accidentally shooting one of his cattle, which was on the other side of some brush. A local taxidermist stuffed the canine. Jack Kirby (Hutchins' grandson) tracked the mount to a museum in Pocatello, Idaho, circa 2007.

Avid Aircraft, a manufacturer of homebuilt aircraft, was located in Ennis. The company ceased operations in 2003.

The 2003 Ennis shooting took place on June 14 of that year, when 44-year-old George Harold Davis opened fire outside the Silver Dollar Saloon bar on Main Street. He killed one man and injured six others. He then fled to Missoula County, where he was finally stopped and arrested by police. He was sentenced to eleven life terms for the crime.

The Thexton Ranch is located approximately 7 miles (11 km) south of Ennis, and is listed on the National Register of Historic Places.

== Geography ==
The town is flanked by the Tobacco Root Mountains to the northwest, the Gravelly Range to the southwest and the Madison Range to the east. Approximately 12 miles (19 km) north of town, the Madison Dam creates Ennis Lake at the head of Bear Trap Canyon.

According to the U.S. Census Bureau, the town has a total area of 0.74 square miles (1.92 km^{2}), of which 0.001 square miles (0.00 km^{2}), or 0.14%, are water. The Madison River, one of the three headwater tributaries of the Missouri River, runs along the eastern border of the town.

=== Climate ===
According to the Köppen Climate Classification system, Ennis has a warm-summer humid continental climate, abbreviated "Dfb" on climate maps.

Climate data for Ennis, Montana, 1991–2020 normals, extremes 1918–present
Month	Jan	Feb	Mar	Apr	May	Jun	Jul	Aug	Sep	Oct	Nov	Dec	Year
Record high °F (°C)	61 (16)	66 (19)	79 (26)	85 (29)	94 (34)	99 (37)	101 (38)	101 (38)	98 (37)	90 (32)	72 (22)	68 (20)	101 (38)
Mean maximum °F (°C)	50.6 (10.3)	53.8 (12.1)	63.9 (17.7)	73.9 (23.3)	81.9 (27.7)	88.4 (31.3)	93.7 (34.3)	93.0 (33.9)	88.7 (31.5)	77.9 (25.5)	63.1 (17.3)	50.1 (10.1)	95.0 (35.0)
Mean daily maximum °F (°C)	34.0 (1.1)	37.1 (2.8)	46.4 (8.0)	54.6 (12.6)	64.1 (17.8)	72.6 (22.6)	82.8 (28.2)	82.1 (27.8)	72.2 (22.3)	57.6 (14.2)	42.7 (5.9)	33.2 (0.7)	56.6 (13.7)
Daily mean °F (°C)	24.6 (−4.1)	26.2 (−3.2)	34.0 (1.1)	41.1 (5.1)	49.4 (9.7)	56.7 (13.7)	64.2 (17.9)	62.8 (17.1)	54.6 (12.6)	43.3 (6.3)	32.1 (0.1)	23.8 (−4.6)	42.7 (6.0)
Mean daily minimum °F (°C)	15.1 (−9.4)	15.3 (−9.3)	21.7 (−5.7)	27.6 (−2.4)	34.7 (1.5)	40.7 (4.8)	45.5 (7.5)	43.6 (6.4)	37.1 (2.8)	29.0 (−1.7)	21.6 (−5.8)	14.5 (−9.7)	28.9 (−1.7)
Mean minimum °F (°C)	−10.0 (−23.3)	−8.3 (−22.4)	3.3 (−15.9)	14.2 (−9.9)	21.9 (−5.6)	31.0 (−0.6)	37.4 (3.0)	35.0 (1.7)	25.5 (−3.6)	11.2 (−11.6)	−2.0 (−18.9)	−9.3 (−22.9)	−20.0 (−28.9)
Record low °F (°C)	−43 (−42)	−43 (−42)	−34 (−37)	−7 (−22)	12 (−11)	24 (−4)	29 (−2)	27 (−3)	10 (−12)	−12 (−24)	−27 (−33)	−35 (−37)	−43 (−42)
Average precipitation inches (mm)	0.45 (11)	0.51 (13)	0.84 (21)	1.47 (37)	1.93 (49)	2.23 (57)	1.16 (29)	1.02 (26)	0.97 (25)	1.14 (29)	0.69 (18)	0.54 (14)	12.95 (329)
Average snowfall inches (cm)	6.5 (17)	7.6 (19)	6.6 (17)	6.0 (15)	1.3 (3.3)	0.2 (0.51)	0.0 (0.0)	0.0 (0.0)	0.1 (0.25)	2.2 (5.6)	6.9 (18)	7.3 (19)	44.7 (114.66)
Average precipitation days (≥ 0.01 in)	5.3	5.9	7.7	10.7	11.8	11.1	8.2	6.6	6.6	7.8	6.6	5.9	94.2
Average snowy days (≥ 0.1 in)	4.3	4.4	4.2	3.3	0.8	0.0	0.0	0.0	0.1	1.5	3.6	5.0	27.2
Source 1: NOAA
Source 2: National Weather Service

== Demographics ==
Historical population
Census	Pop.	Note	%±
1960	525		—
1970	501		−4.6%
1980	660		31.7%
1990	773		17.1%
2000	840		8.7%
2010	838		−0.2%
2020	917		9.4%
U.S. Decennial Census

=== 2010 census ===
As of the census of 2010, there were 838 people, 416 households, and 207 families residing in the town. The population density was 1,074.4 inhabitants per square mile (414.8/km^{2}). There were 527 housing units at an average density of 675.6 per square mile (260.9/km^{2}). The racial makeup of the town was 96.9% White, 0.1% African American, 0.8% Native American, 0.2% Asian, 0.5% from other races, and 1.4% from two or more races. Hispanic or Latino of any race were 1.9% of the population.

There were 416 households, of which 20.4% had children under the age of 18 living with them, 36.8% were married couples living together, 9.9% had a female householder with no husband present, 3.1% had a male householder with no wife present, and 50.2% were non-families. 42.5% of all households were made up of individuals, and 20.4% had someone living alone who was 65 years of age or older. The average household size was 1.91 and the average family size was 2.60.

The median age in the town was 49.8 years. 15.8% of residents were under the age of 18; 6% were between the ages of 18 and 24; 22.2% were from 25 to 44; 30.7% were from 45 to 64; and 25.3% were 65 years of age or older. The gender makeup of the town was 49.4% male and 50.6% female.

=== 2000 census ===
As of the census of 2000, there were 840 people, 367 households, and 219 families residing in the town. The population density was 1,240.2 inhabitants per square mile (478.8/km^{2}). There were 434 housing units at an average density of 640.8 per square mile (247.4/km^{2}). The racial makeup of the town was 97.98% White, 0.48% from other races, and 1.55% from two or more races. Hispanic or Latino of any race were 0.71% of the population.

There were 367 households, out of which 27.2% had children under the age of 18 living with them, 46.9% were married couples living together, 9.5% had a female householder with no husband present, and 40.1% were non-families. 36.0% of all households were made up of individuals, and 11.2% had someone living alone who was 65 years of age or older. The average household size was 2.20 and the average family size was 2.87.

In the town, the population was spread out, with 24.3% under the age of 18, 5.7% from 18 to 24, 23.0% from 25 to 44, 26.3% from 45 to 64, and 20.7% who were 65 years of age or older. The median age was 43 years. For every 100 females there were 90.9 males. For every 100 females age 18 and over, there were 94.5 males.

The median income for a household in the town was $30,735, and the median income for a family was $38,542. Males had a median income of $30,956 versus $16,875 for females. The per capita income for the town was $17,310. About 7.7% of families and 11.9% of the population were below the poverty line, including 10.9% of those under age 18 and 11.7% of those age 65 or over.

== Economy ==
Ennis is the center of a long-standing ranching economy in the Madison River valley. Large cattle and sheep ranches dot the valley north and south of the town along the river. Ennis is also a major tourist attraction and angling destination for fly fishermen targeting rainbow and brown trout. The small town hosts at least three fly shops and numerous resorts that cater to fly anglers with guided fishing trips on the Madison and in nearby Yellowstone National Park. Ennis is home to Willie's Distillery, known for its bourbon and moonshine, and one of the growing number of micro-distilleries in Montana.

== Arts and culture ==
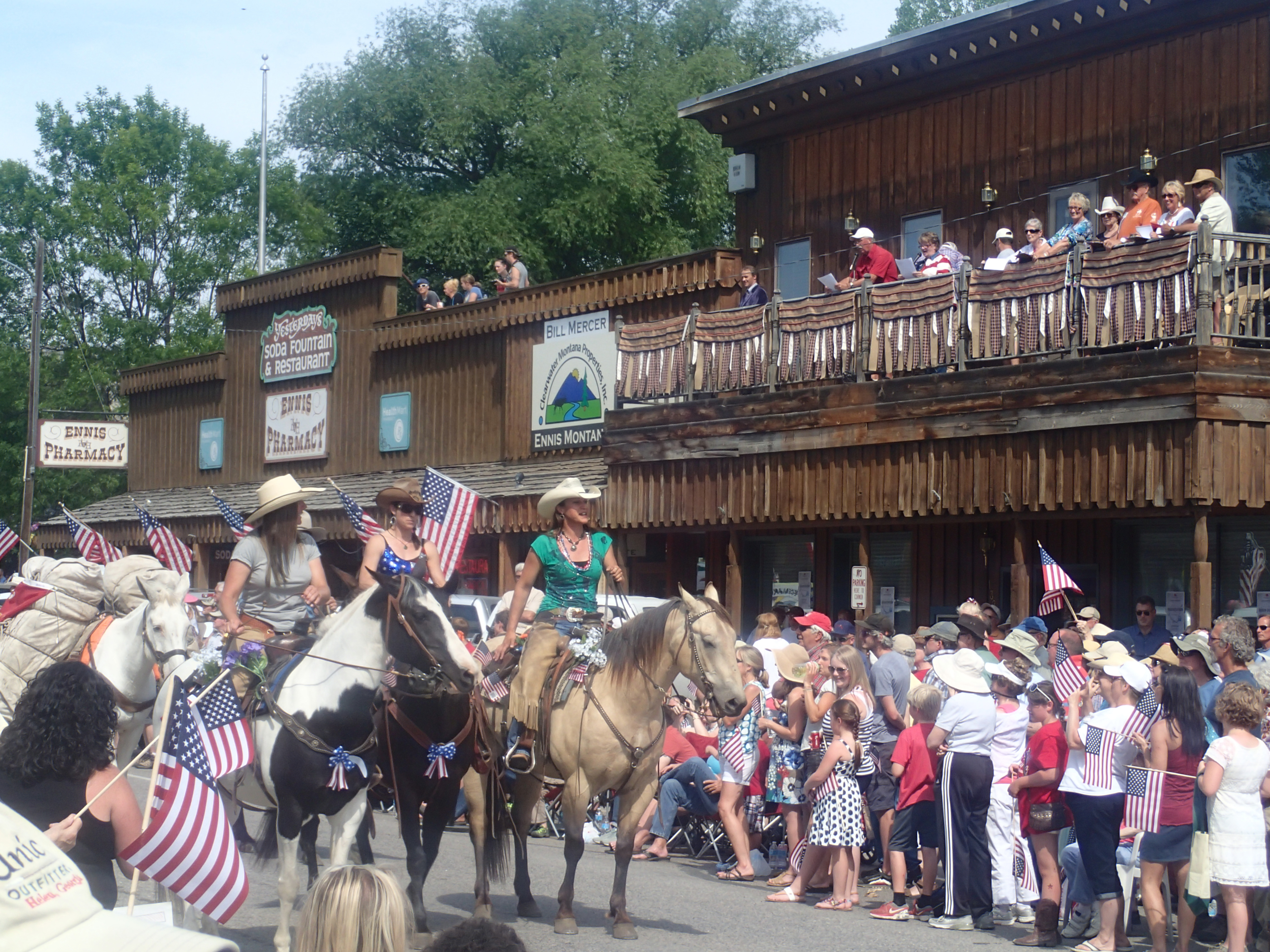
Ennis 4th of July parade 2014

Ennis has a public library, the Madison Valley Public Library.

=== Events ===
- Ennis has an annual July 4 parade, which includes a rodeo event.
- Ennis on the Madison Fly Fishing Festival occurs in August.
- The Madison Trifecta is a duathlon held on the 4th of July weekend between Ennis and Virginia City, Montana. A full marathon, the highest elevation run (over 9,000 feet (2,700 m)) in the United States, is held in July. The Madison Triathlon is held in August between Ennis and Harrison, Montana.
- In October, the annual Hunters Feed takes place the day before rifle season opens.
- Tap Into Ennis is Montana's first combined brewery and distillery festival, and includes breweries and distilleries, artists, and local music.
- Ennis hosts the Madison Valley Arts Festival.

== Government ==
Ennis has a mayor and town commissioners. As of January 2026 the Mayor of Ennis, Montana is Lisa Roberts, who ran unopposed in November 2025. Roberts replaced Nici Haas as mayor, whose tenure was 2022–2025.

== Education ==
It is in the Ennis K-12 Schools school district.

Ennis Schools educates students from kindergarten through 12th grade. Ennis High School's team name is the Mustangs.

== Media ==
The Madisonian is a newspaper serving Madison County. It is printed weekly and offers an e-edition.

== Infrastructure ==
Ennis is located on U.S. Highway 287 and Montana Highway 287.

The town is served by the Big Sky Airport. The closest airport with regularly scheduled commercial service is Bozeman Yellowstone International Airport, 54 miles (87 km) away.

The Madison Valley Medical Center provides healthcare to the community.
