= Ferris-Hermsmeyer-Fenton Ranch =

- Ferris--Hermsmeyer--Fenton Ranch
- U.S. National Register of Historic Places
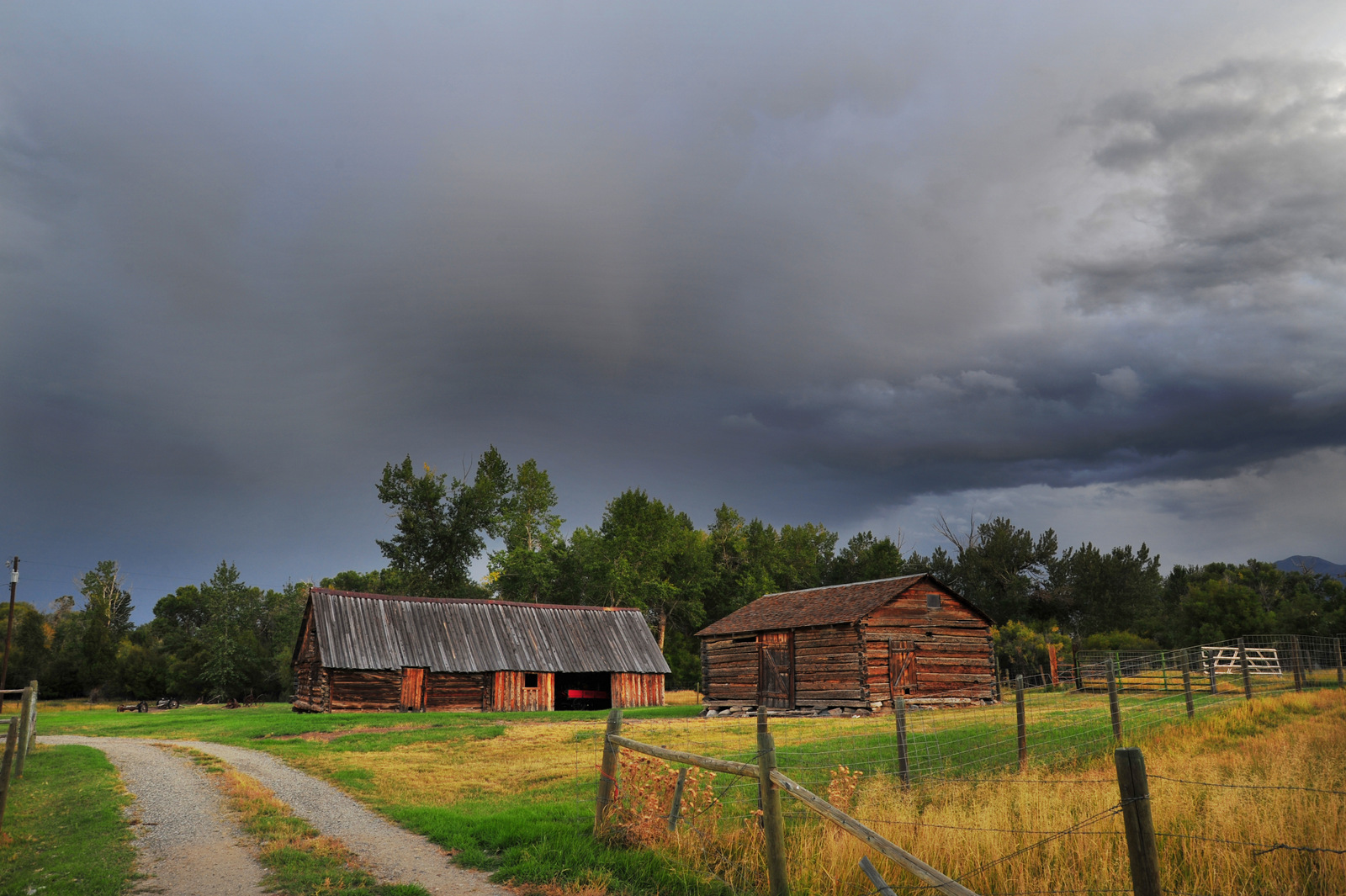
- "Wuelfing Barns"

- Location within Montana
- Location: 144 Duncan District Rd., Sheridan, Montana
- Coordinates: 45°26′59″N 112°14′03″W
- Area: 160 acres (0.65 km^{2})
- Built: 1866
- Built by: John Barber; Fred Hermsmeyer; others
- Architectural style: Rustic
- NRHP reference No.: 07001364
- Added to NRHP: January 9, 2008

The Ferris-Hermsmeyer-Fenton Ranch, at 144 Duncan District Rd. in Sheridan, Montana, in Madison County, Montana, was listed on the National Register of Historic Places in 2008. The listing included a 160 acres (0.65 km^{2}) area with nine contributing buildings, a contributing structure and two contributing sites.

The ranch was established in 1872 by Jane Ferris. It is located in the heart of the Ruby River valley. Ferris' application described an original c.1866 barn which still exists.

Jane Ferris was a widow with two small children. She seems to have been the only woman in the Sheridan area who was successful in using preemption to secure land and a home, for herself and her heirs. The lower Ruby Valley was opened for settlement in 1863, soon after gold discoveries in Bannack and in Alder Gulch nearby, and before there was any government survey of the land which could have led to sale of the land to the public. By the 1841 Preemption Act, any 160-acre area of unsurveyed land was open for settlement, essentially by squatters who lived on the land for 14 months, by heads of households being either a man over age 21 or a widow. The property that she claimed included an 1866 cabin, which became a portion of the main residence, and an 1866 barn, and these were described by Ferris in her 1872 application for preemption.

The property was farmed by her daughter and her family in the late 1870s and early 1880s. Later, the Frederick and George Hermsmeyer families further improved the property with additional buildings related to farming. Various owners held the property after World War I, then in 1937 the Fendon family took ownership. The Fentons brought the ranch back into prosperity and improved it, especially during and after World War II when agricultural prices were better. The ranch had stayed among Fenton descendants for 70 years when it was nominated for listing on the National Register in 2007, at which time it was owned in the Wuelfing last name.

The ranch was deemed significant for its "association with women's history and the use of federal public land law for settlement in southwest Montana during the formation of Montana territory."
