= Big Sky Airport =

- IATA: none; ICAO: KEKS; FAA LID: EKS

Summary
- Airport type: Public
- Owner: Madison County
- Serves: Ennis, Montana
- Elevation AMSL: 5,433 ft (1,656 m)
- Coordinates: 45°16′28″N 111°38′56″W
- Interactive map of Big Sky Airport

Runways
Direction	Length		Surface
Direction	ft	m	Surface
16/34	7,600	2,316	Asphalt

Statistics (2019)
- Aircraft operations (year ending 7/21/2019): 12,350
- Based aircraft: 19
- Source: Federal Aviation Administration

Big Sky Airport (ICAO: KEKS, FAA LID: EKS) (also known as Ennis Big Sky Airport) is a county-owned, public-use airport located six nautical miles (7 mi, 11 km) southeast of the central business district of Ennis, a town in Madison County, Montana, United States. It is included in the National Plan of Integrated Airport Systems for 2011–2015, which categorized it as a general aviation airport.

Although many U.S. airports use the same three-letter location identifier for the FAA and IATA, this facility is assigned EKS by the FAA but has no designation from the IATA.

== Facilities and aircraft ==
Big Sky Airport has one runway designated 16/34 with an asphalt surface measuring 7,600 by 100 feet (2,316 x 30 m).

For the 12-month period ending July 21, 2019, the airport had 12,350 aircraft operations, an average of 34 per day: 93% general aviation, 6% air taxi, and <1% military. At that time there were 34 aircraft based at this airport: 30 single-engine, 2 multi-engine, and 2 helicopter.

Ascension FBO Network, the airport's fixed-base operator (FBO), offers fuel, aircraft/hangar rental, and other services.

On 19 February 2020, Big Sky Airport was awarded a $5.6 million FAA grant to extend the main taxiway to 7,600 ft (2,316 m), repave portions of the runway, and expand the airport property.

== See also ==
- List of airports in Montana
