= Thexton Ranch =

- U.S. National Register of Historic Places
- U.S. Historic district
- Location within Montana Location within the United States
- Location: 335 Varney Rd., Ennis, Montana
- Coordinates: 45°16′52.75″N 111°45′43.7″W
- Area: 240 acres (97 ha)
- Built: 1883
- Architect: Johnson, Charles; Bauer, Jake
- Architectural style: Queen Anne
- NRHP reference No.: 06000426
- Added to NRHP: May 12, 2006

The Thexton Ranch, also known as Thextondale, was established by George Thexton in 1872 on the Madison River about 7 miles (11 km) south of Ennis, Montana. The ranch is a significant example of an operating Montana ranch, and has been listed on the National Register of Historic Places for its prominence in local history and its character as a ranching operation.

== History ==
Thexton had been born in England in 1824, and emigrated to the United States in 1855 with his wife Nancy Redhead Thexton. They settled in Grant County, Wisconsin, where Thexton took up his trade as a blacksmith. George remained there until 1864, when he left his family in Wisconsin and went to seek his fortune in the Alder Gulch goldfields of Montana, taking his tools with him. Having seen an opportunity to establish a business in Montana, he returned to Wisconsin to fetch his wife and four children. By the time they had reached Montana in 1867 there were five children. Thexton opened a blacksmith shop in Virginia City. In 1871 he established the Star Livery stable. By the next year he was able to buy his first 160 acres (65 ha) on the Madison from Charles Johnson. George continued to manage his businesses in Virginia City, building a stone house there in 1884. By 1888 his wife and his two oldest sons had died, and George moved to the ranch with his surviving son Thomas, his daughter Annie, and his niece Agnes Whalley. George Thexton lived on the ranch until his death in 1904.

Thomas Thexton had helped his father and had operated a cartage business hauling freight around Madison County. Thomas concentrated on building up herds of shorthorn cattle and horse after he moved to the ranch. He married Mary Ann Foreman in 1899. In 1910 Thomas hired a carpenter to build a new house which was completed in 1912, and expanded the ranch to more than 500 acres. Thomas died in 1929 and his wife and sons operated the ranch. Tom Thexton moved into the original ranch log ranch house while his mother, sisters and brothers lived in the newer stone house. The ranch prospered during World War II. By 1977, when Don and Tom Thexton sold the ranch, it had expanded to comprise 3,000 acres (1,200 ha), with an additional 5,000 acres (2,000 ha) of leased land. The log ranch house was torn down. The ranch continues as an active cattle ranch.

== Description ==
The ranch headquarters is located on a bench along Blaine Spring Creek, near the Madison River about 1,200 yards (1,100 m) to the east. The chief structure is the 1910-1912 ranch house, built by Jake Bauer. The house is a two-story cast-in-place concrete building with a hipped pyramidal roof. Large stones have been cast into the walls. There are two enclosed porches. A one-story log bunkhouse is located behind the main house, with two rooms, one storage and the other a room for a hired hand. The two -story log barn is to the south of the bunkhouse. It is believed to have been built before 1912. A root cellar, also built before 1912 is to the north of the barn. The 30-foot (9.1 m) by 30-foot (9.1 m) log granary remains as well. A hay road runs from the barn, past the granary and down to a ford on Blaine Spring Creek, running in a coulee down to the hay fields in the stream valley.

== Present ==
The original Thexton Ranch is part of the north unit of the Alton Ranch. The Thexton Ranch was placed on the National Register of Historic Places on May 12, 2006.
