= Christ Episcopal Church and Rectory (Sheridan, Montana) =

Historic church in Montana, United States

- U.S. National Register of Historic Places
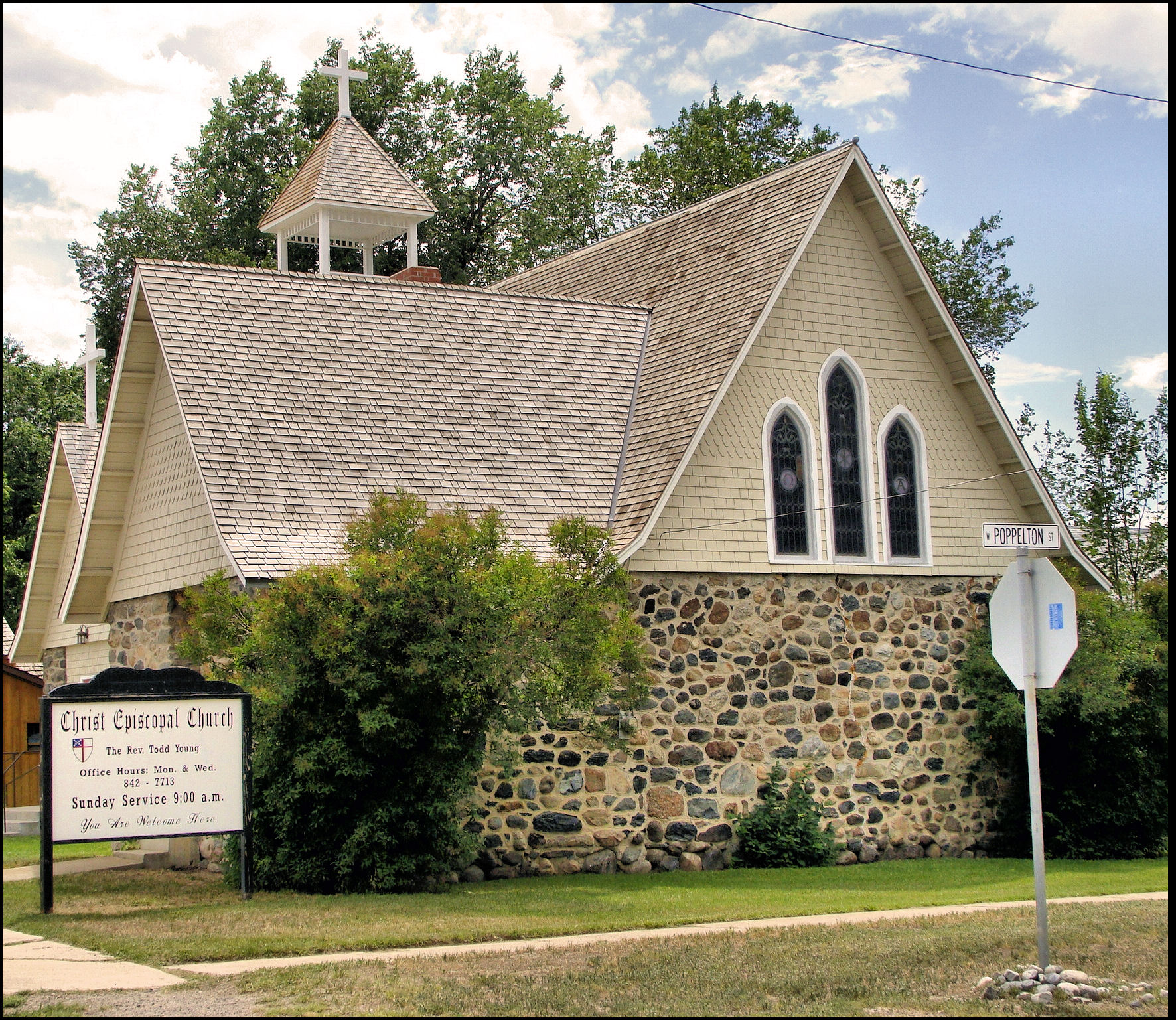

- Location within Montana Location within the United States
- Location: 304 S. Main St., Sheridan, Montana
- Coordinates: 45°27′13″N 112°11′45″W
- Area: less than one acre
- Built: 1896
- Architect: Hancock, George
- NRHP reference No.: 86003672
- Added to NRHP: January 22, 1987

The Christ Episcopal Church and Rectory in Sheridan, Montana is a property listed on the National Register of Historic Places. It includes a one-story church built of local granite, with two gables facing onto Main Street. To its west is a two-story gambrel roofed rectory built in 1906, also of the local granite. As of 1987, a c.1960 parish hall stood between them, and there was a c.1900 wood-frame garage at the back of the property.

The church has an open bell tower that was added in 1901.

The church probably was designed by architect George Hancock.
