= Alder, Montana =

- Census-designated place
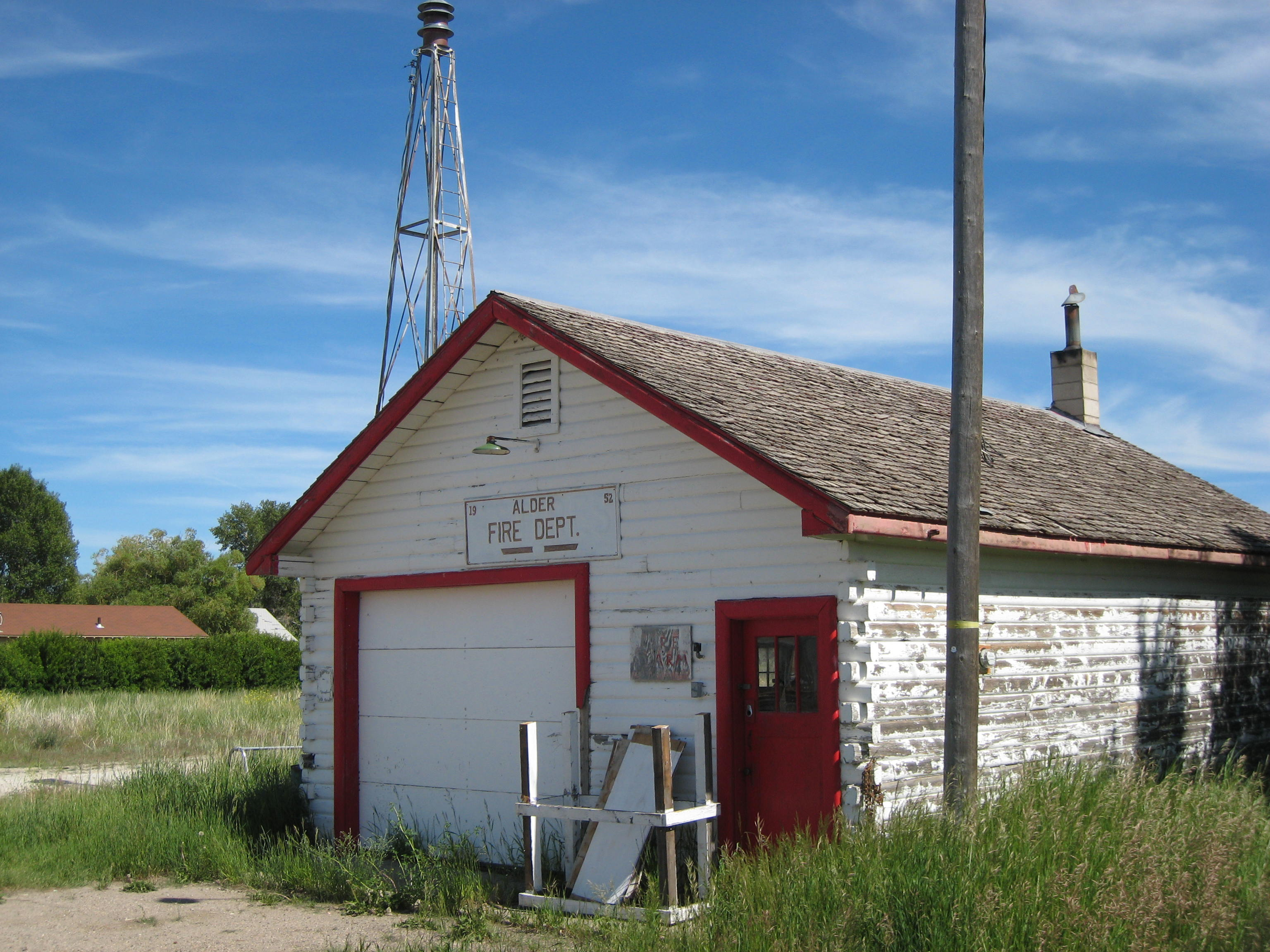
- The old fire station in Alder (2007)

- Location in Madison County and the state of Montana
- Coordinates: 45°19′18″N 112°06′33″W
- Country: United States
- State: Montana
- County: Madison

Area
  - Total: 2.01 sq mi (5.20 km^{2})
  - Land: 2.01 sq mi (5.20 km^{2})
  - Water: 0 sq mi (0.00 km^{2})
- Elevation: 5,125 ft (1,562 m)

Population (2020)
  - Total: 86
  - Density: 42.9/sq mi (16.55/km^{2})
- Time zone: UTC-7 (Mountain (MST))
  - Summer (DST): UTC-6 (MDT)
- ZIP code: 59710
- Area code: 406
- FIPS code: 30-00850
- GNIS feature ID: 2407713

Alder is an unincorporated community and census-designated place (CDP) in Madison County, Montana, United States. The population was 86 at the 2020 census, down from 103 in 2010. The community takes its name from Alder Creek (named by Henry Edgar in 1863), the site of the second major gold discovery in Montana.

== Geography ==
Alder is located in west-central Madison County. Alder Creek enters the valley from the east and passes east of the community. Montana Highway 287 passes through town, leading east 9 miles (14 km) to Virginia City, the county seat, and northwest 10 miles (16 km) to Sheridan. The Ruby River runs along the western edge of the community, and the Ruby River Reservoir is 7 miles (11 km) to the south.

According to the U.S. Census Bureau, the Alder CDP has a total area of 2.01 square miles (5.2 km^{2}), all land.

=== Climate ===
This climatic region is typified by large seasonal temperature differences, with warm to hot (and often humid) summers and cold (sometimes severely cold) winters. According to the Köppen Climate Classification system, Alder has a humid continental climate, abbreviated "Dfb" on climate maps.

Climate data for Alder, Montana, 1991–2020 normals, extremes 1956–present
Month	Jan	Feb	Mar	Apr	May	Jun	Jul	Aug	Sep	Oct	Nov	Dec	Year
Record high °F (°C)	61 (16)	62 (17)	70 (21)	81 (27)	89 (32)	95 (35)	96 (36)	97 (36)	92 (33)	83 (28)	72 (22)	61 (16)	97 (36)
Mean maximum °F (°C)	48.9 (9.4)	50.7 (10.4)	61.4 (16.3)	70.7 (21.5)	78.1 (25.6)	83.6 (28.7)	89.8 (32.1)	89.5 (31.9)	84.5 (29.2)	74.3 (23.5)	59.9 (15.5)	48.2 (9.0)	91.3 (32.9)
Mean daily maximum °F (°C)	33.6 (0.9)	35.8 (2.1)	45.2 (7.3)	52.3 (11.3)	61.6 (16.4)	69.3 (20.7)	80.3 (26.8)	80.2 (26.8)	69.0 (20.6)	55.1 (12.8)	41.8 (5.4)	33.1 (0.6)	54.8 (12.6)
Daily mean °F (°C)	24.7 (−4.1)	25.9 (−3.4)	34.0 (1.1)	40.5 (4.7)	48.7 (9.3)	55.9 (13.3)	64.2 (17.9)	63.7 (17.6)	54.2 (12.3)	42.8 (6.0)	31.4 (−0.3)	23.6 (−4.7)	42.5 (5.8)
Mean daily minimum °F (°C)	15.7 (−9.1)	15.9 (−8.9)	22.8 (−5.1)	28.8 (−1.8)	35.8 (2.1)	42.4 (5.8)	48.0 (8.9)	47.3 (8.5)	39.4 (4.1)	30.6 (−0.8)	21.0 (−6.1)	14.1 (−9.9)	30.2 (−1.0)
Mean minimum °F (°C)	−11.8 (−24.3)	−8.9 (−22.7)	2.3 (−16.5)	11.9 (−11.2)	21.0 (−6.1)	29.0 (−1.7)	36.2 (2.3)	34.4 (1.3)	24.0 (−4.4)	10.3 (−12.1)	−3.5 (−19.7)	−10.1 (−23.4)	−20.6 (−29.2)
Record low °F (°C)	−35 (−37)	−30 (−34)	−19 (−28)	−2 (−19)	11 (−12)	22 (−6)	24 (−4)	23 (−5)	8 (−13)	−9 (−23)	−29 (−34)	−41 (−41)	−41 (−41)
Average precipitation inches (mm)	0.29 (7.4)	0.55 (14)	0.58 (15)	1.28 (33)	2.37 (60)	2.97 (75)	1.17 (30)	1.24 (31)	1.23 (31)	1.29 (33)	0.61 (15)	0.48 (12)	14.06 (356.4)
Average snowfall inches (cm)	8.2 (21)	7.5 (19)	8.4 (21)	9.7 (25)	3.6 (9.1)	0.1 (0.25)	0.0 (0.0)	0.0 (0.0)	0.2 (0.51)	3.1 (7.9)	8.0 (20)	8.4 (21)	57.2 (144.76)
Average precipitation days (≥ 0.01 in)	4.8	4.5	5.1	9.4	11.6	10.5	6.9	7.4	4.6	6.0	5.3	4.7	80.8
Average snowy days (≥ 0.1 in)	5.1	5.0	4.2	4.9	1.5	0.2	0.0	0.0	0.2	2.0	4.4	5.5	33.0
Source 1: NOAA
Source 2: National Weather Service

== Demographics ==
Historical population
Census	Pop.	Note	%±
2000	116		—
2010	103		−11.2%
2020	86		−16.5%
U.S. Decennial Census

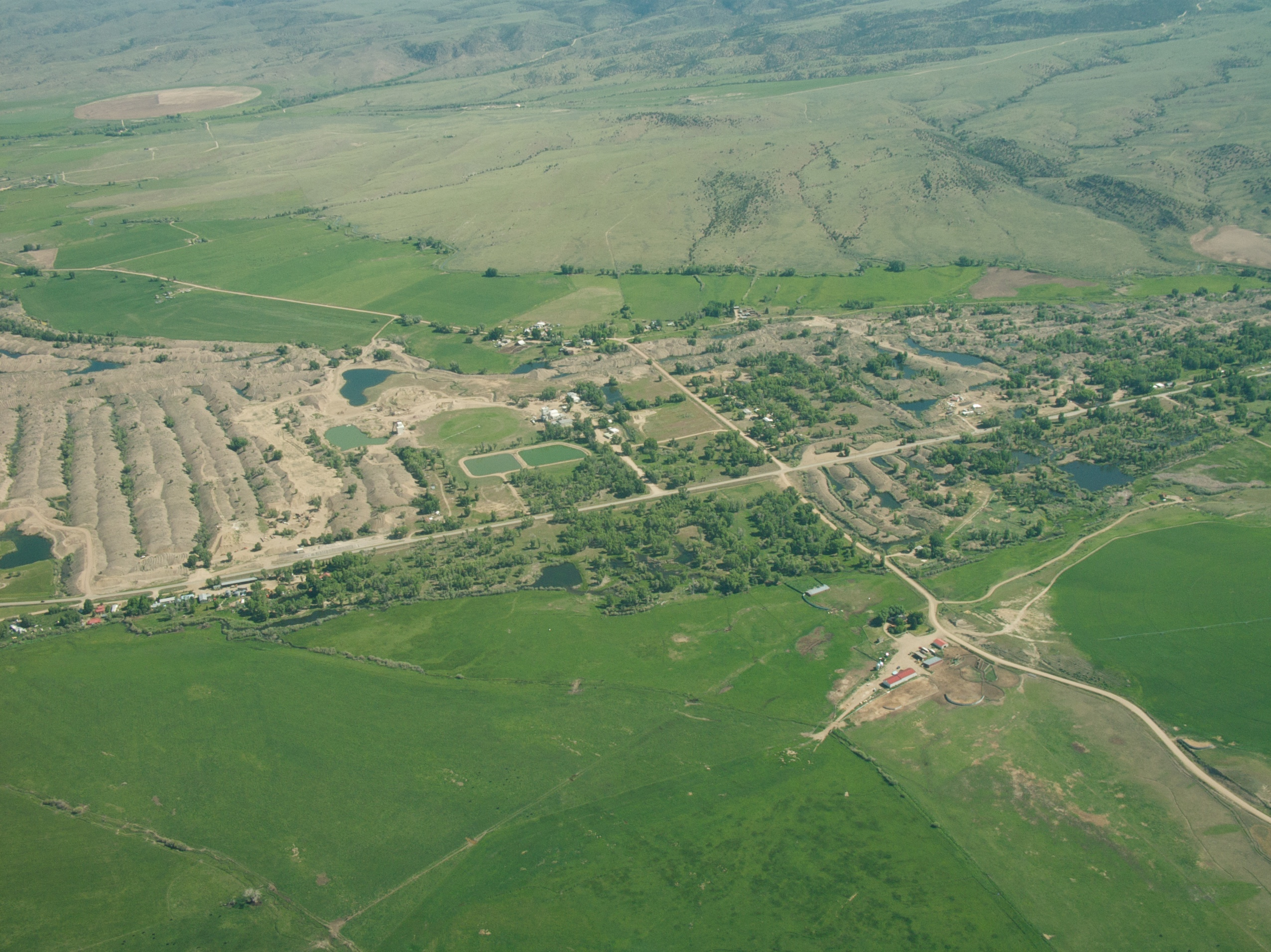
Aerial view of Alder, June 2008

As of the census of 2000, there were 116 people, 48 households, and 25 families residing in the CDP. The population density was 57.6 inhabitants per square mile (22.2/km^{2}). There were 69 housing units at an average density of 34.3 per square mile (13.2/km^{2}). The racial makeup of the CDP was 100.00% White.

There were 48 households, out of which 27.1% had children under the age of 18 living with them, 45.8% were married couples living together, 4.2% had a female householder with no husband present, and 47.9% were non-families. 33.3% of all households were made up of individuals, and 16.7% had someone living alone who was 65 years of age or older. The average household size was 2.42 and the average family size was 3.44.

In the CDP, the population was spread out, with 26.7% under the age of 18, 6.0% from 18 to 24, 27.6% from 25 to 44, 27.6% from 45 to 64, and 12.1% who were 65 years of age or older. The median age was 38 years. For every 100 females, there were 110.9 males. For every 100 females age 18 and over, there were 107.3 males.

The median income for a household in the CDP was $26,458, and the median income for a family was $33,750. Males had a median income of $22,500 versus $30,000 for females. The per capita income for the CDP was $16,300. There were no families and 1.8% of the population living below the poverty line, including no under eighteens and none of those over 64.

== Media ==
The Madisonian is a newspaper serving the Madison and Ruby Valleys, which includes Twin Bridges. It is printed weekly and offers an e-edition.

== Education ==
Alder is mostly in the Alder Elementary School District, with a portion in the Sheridan Elementary School District. All of Alder is in the Sheridan High School District. Both Sheridan elementary and high school districts are components of Sheridan Public Schools.

== In popular culture ==
Alder is mentioned in the song "Myrna Loy", by American songwriter Josh Ritter, from his 2017 album Gathering.

== See also ==
- List of census-designated places in Montana
