= Virginia City Historic District (Virginia City, Montana) =

Historic district in Montana, United States

- U.S. National Register of Historic Places
- U.S. National Historic Landmark District
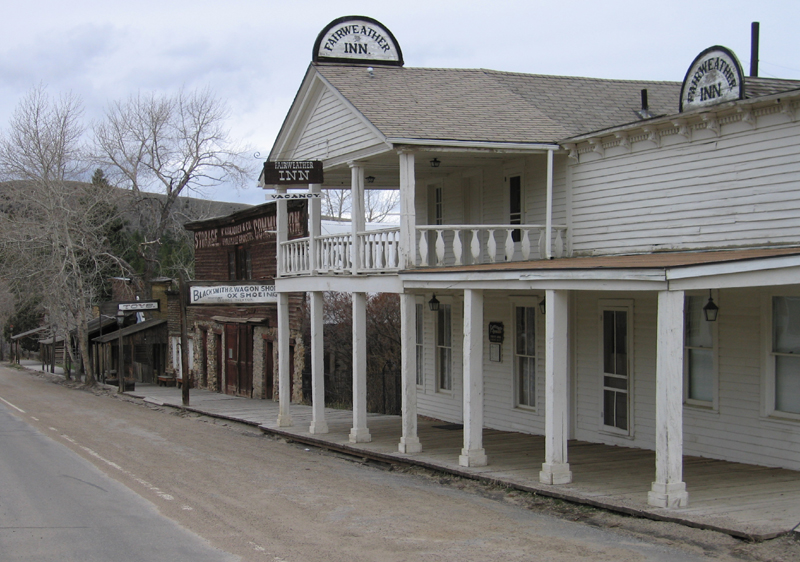

- Location within Montana Location within the United States
- Location: Virginia City, Montana
- Coordinates: 45°17′27″N 111°56′35″W
- Area: 20,000 acres (81 km^{2})
- Built: 1863
- NRHP reference No.: 66000435

Significant dates
- Added to NRHP: October 15, 1966
- Designated NHLD: July 4, 1961

The Virginia City Historic District is a National Historic Landmark District encompassing Virginia City, Montana, United States. Designated in 1966, the district includes over two hundred nineteenth-century buildings, representing the site of a major gold strike and the capital of Montana for ten years.

Virginia City was founded in the early 1860s, in the wake of a major gold find in Alder Gulch, which ascends into the mountains to the south. It grew rapidly with the influx of gold seekers, and was by 1865 so large and prosperous that it was made the capital of the Montana Territory. Alder Gulch was lined with mining communities of all sizes, with an estimated total population of 10,000 in 1865. Of these, Virginia City was the largest, and is the only major community to survive later declines in the mining economy. By the 1930s large mining operations had either demolished or buried most of the other communities. In the 1940s Charles and Sue Bovey began to buy up abandoned buildings and restoring them, in effect creating an open-air museum.[3]

The landmark district encompasses an area of about 20,000 acres (81 km2), including the entire city limits of Virginia City and a significant portion of Alder Gulch where mining operations took place. Many of the city's buildings were built before the turn of the 20th century, and a significant number date to its heyday in the 1860s. Many of the commercial buildings are of wood-frame construction, and have traditional false front facades. The single most prominent building is the Madison County Courthouse, built in 1875. A few of the surviving 19th-century buildings have log construction, and harken back to the city's earliest days.[3]

== See also ==
- List of National Historic Landmarks in Montana
- National Register of Historic Places listings in Madison County, Montana
