= St. Mary of the Assumption Church (Laurin, Montana) =

- U.S. National Register of Historic Places
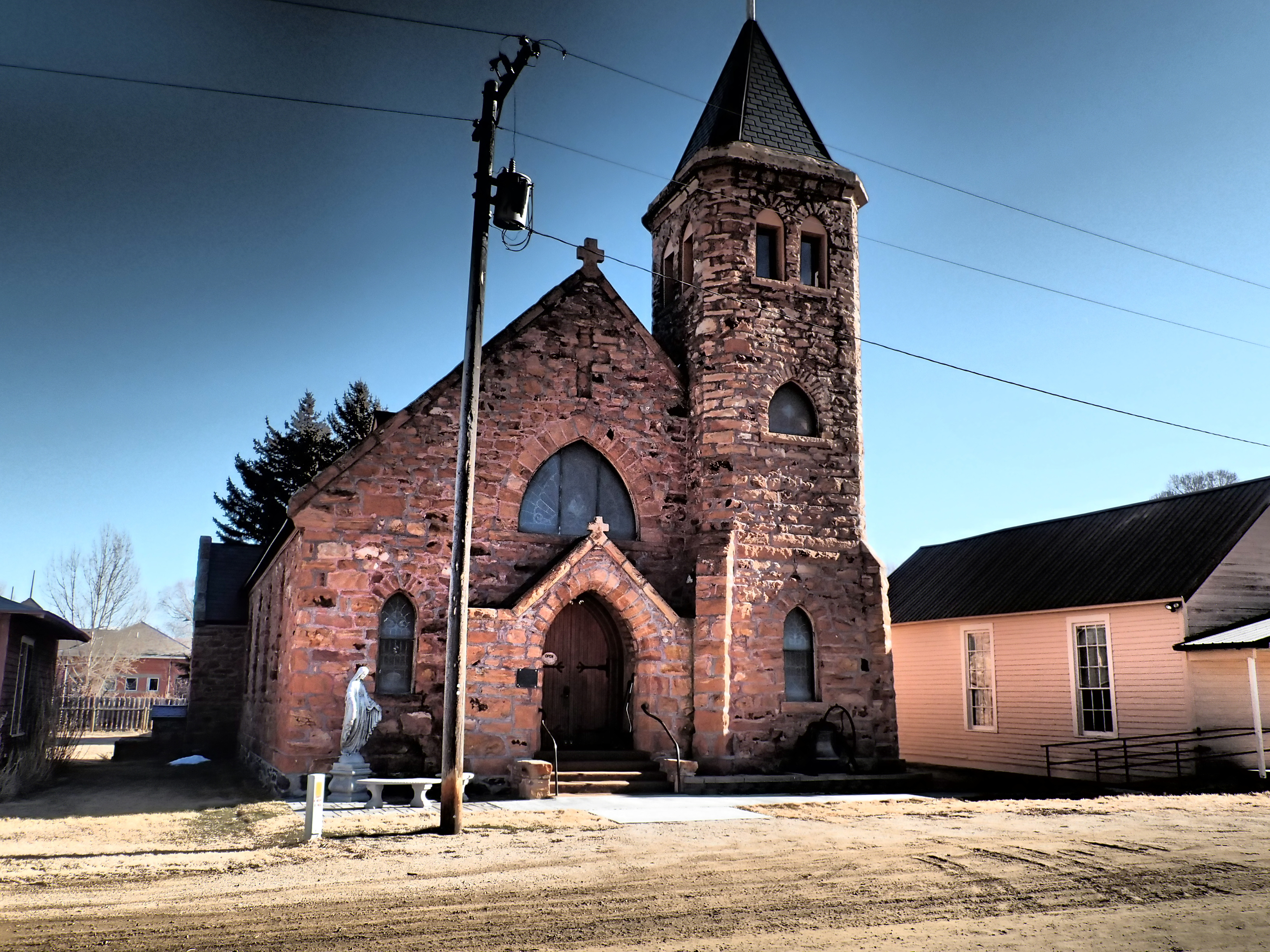

- Location within Montana Location within the United States
- Location: Laurin, MT
- Coordinates: 45°21′15″N 112°07′15″W
- Built: 1899
- Architect: Charles Stabern/ C.S. Haire
- Architectural style: Gothic Revival
- NRHP reference No.: 85003380

St. Mary of the Assumption Church is a parish of the Roman Catholic Church located at Laurin, Madison County, Montana, United States, in the Diocese of Helena. It is noted for its historic parish church.

== History ==
Built between 1899 and 1900, St. Mary of the Assumption church in Laurin is significant as a well-preserved example of Gothic Revival ecclesiastical architecture. Designed by the eminent Montana architectural firm of Link & Haire, the church features extraordinarily high quality craftsmanship exhibited by the masonry and interior woodwork, a prominent three story bell tower in the front, and stained glass Gothic windows highlighted by decorative stone arches and lintels. St. Mary of the Assumption has served as the primary Roman Catholic church for a widely dispersed mining and agricultural population within the Ruby Valley of southwestern Montana for nearly 90 years. It is a major architectural landmark and the largest building in Laurin. After gold was discovered in nearby Alder Gulch in 1863 and a rush of fortune seekers flooded the area, this small community of Laurin, which has a population of less than 50 people, quickly became established as an important trading post for the entire Ruby Valley mining region. The original canvas tent trading post, later replaced by a log structure, which also served as the general mercantile store, was opened and operated by Jean-Baptiste Laurin, the founder of the town. In the mid-1860s, over 10,000 miners moved to the area, but within five years most mines were no longer economically viable and towns in the valley were abandoned in favor of new strikes. As a result of his enterprising business endeavors during the mining boom, Jean Laurin became one of the wealthiest citizens in Laurin and, according to early newspaper accounts, shared his wealth in order to promote the success of the town. In 1897, after Laurin and his wife had died, $8,000 was donated in her name toward the construction of a new Catholic church in Laurin for an expanding parish.

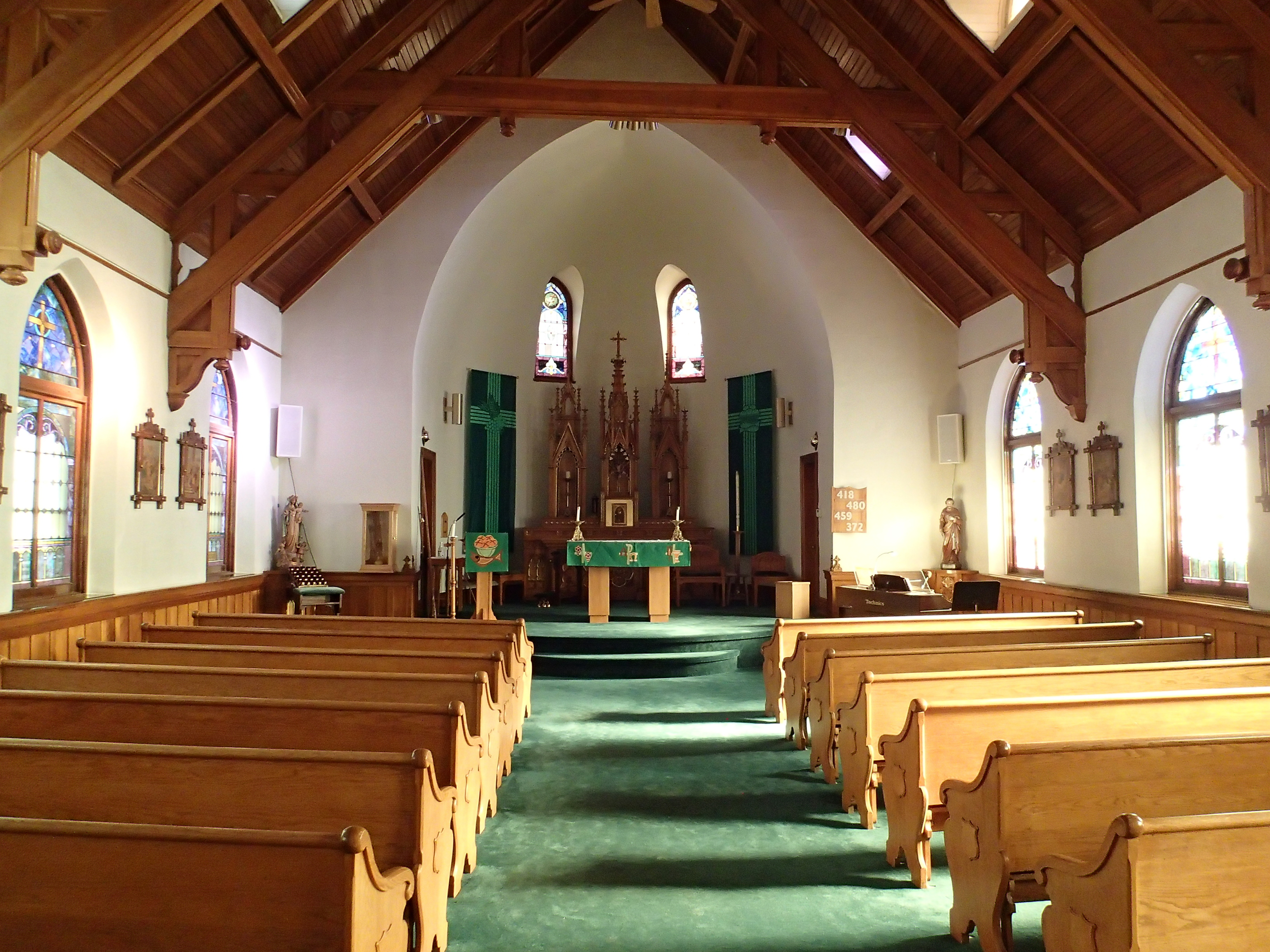
Interior of St. Mary of the Assumption Church

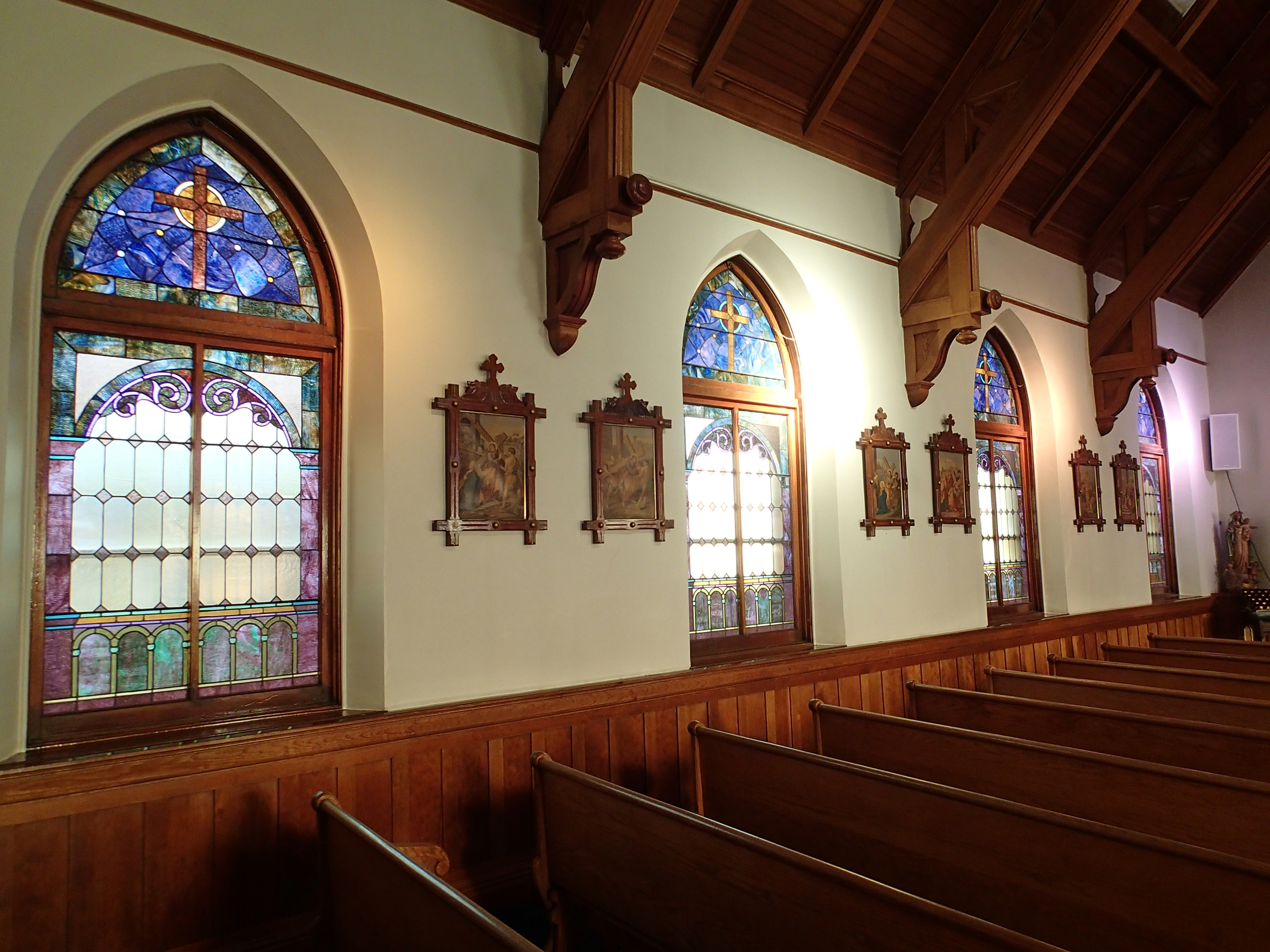
Stained Glass at St Mary of the Assumption Church

St. Mary of the Assumption Church is the second Catholic church to be built in Laurin. Since its dedication in 1901, St. Mary's has been used in conjunction with the original 1875 frame church that stands adjacent to the property and is currently used as the parish hall. St. Mary's is the most substantial and well-crafted building in Laurin and is a major visual component of this community's identity. Typically church buildings in small, rural towns throughout Montana during the late 19th century were built of wood frame and sheathed with white clapboard siding. Following a basic one room plan, these gable-roofed buildings invariably had a rectangular shape with a square bell tower placed atop the roof. More substantial brick or stone churches were usually found in larger communities where bigger parishes called for, and could support the construction of these structures. In Laurin, which in the later 1800s likely had a population of at least several hundred people, the need for a larger and more expansive church became clear when the parish outgrew the earlier 1875 frame building.

== Architectural features ==
Built along a modified cruciform ecclesiastical Gothic plan, the sandstone church rests on an un-coursed granite foundation, and has to the right side of the main entrance a shouldered, three story, single bell tower with an octagonal roof. Decorative wooden fascia board encircles the church at the eaves. Windows along the nave, apse and on the tower are stained glass, produced in Minneapolis by the Forman Ford Company, and have Gothic stone arches with solid sandstone sills. Windows in the chancel and ambulatory are 1/1 double hung sash with stone lintels and sills. All window frames are original. Between 1956 and 1959, new concrete steps were constructed in both the front and rear of the building. From 1977 to 1981, deteriorating mortar in the foundation and walls was replaced, and the stained glass windows were covered on the exterior with Lexan. Solid oak doors in the front of the church were finished in 1983. The gable roof, which is covered with the original fish-scale patterned metal shingles, has four matching gable dormers on each side with single pane lancet windows. A cement-covered chimney pierces the roof at the rear of the building. The interior of the church remains essentially the same as when originally constructed in 1899. The vaulted ceiling has attractive, ornamental oak wood trusses, while oak wains coting, pews and furnishings still adorn the nave of the church. There is a hand-crafted oak reredos behind the altar which extends for the full height from the floor to the ceiling. Between 1956 and 1959, the semi-circular shaped chancel was extended five feet into the nave, and the church lights were replaced with contemporary spotlights. In 1984, the chancel was expanded into a circular shape and the interior was carpeted. The original wood frame Catholic church and rectory, built in1875 are located adjacent to St. Mary of the Assumption church.
