= Sheridan, Montana =

- Town
- Location of Sheridan, Montana
- Coordinates: 45°27′33″N 112°11′41″W
- Country: United States
- State: Montana
- County: Madison

Area
  - Total: 1.01 sq mi (2.62 km^{2})
  - Land: 1.01 sq mi (2.62 km^{2})
  - Water: 0 sq mi (0.00 km^{2})
- Elevation: 5,128 ft (1,563 m)

Population (2020)
  - Total: 694
  - Density: 686.1/sq mi (264.92/km^{2})
- Time zone: UTC-7 (Mountain (MST))
  - Summer (DST): UTC-6 (MDT)
- ZIP code: 59749
- Area code: 406
- FIPS code: 30-67600
- GNIS feature ID: 2413279
- Website: townofsheridanmt.org

Sheridan is a town in Madison County, Montana, United States named after the Civil War general Philip Sheridan. The population was 694 at the 2020 census. Sheridan is known as the "heart of the Ruby Valley." Seven mountain ranges surround the town: Tobacco Root Mountains, Highland Mountains, McCartney Mountain, The Pioneers, The Ruby Range, The Gravelly Range and the Snowcrest Range. The Ruby River winds through the valley just west of the town.

Sheridan traces its beginnings to the construction of a sawmill on Mill Creek by James Gammell in 1863.

== Geography ==
Montana Highway 287 passes through town.

According to the United States Census Bureau, the town has a total area of 1.02 square miles (2.64 km^{2}), all land.

=== Climate ===
According to the Köppen Climate Classification system, Sheridan has a semi-arid climate, abbreviated "BSk" on climate maps.

== Demographics ==
Historical population
Census	Pop.	Note	%±
1880	156		—
1890	207		32.7%
1900	581		180.7%
1910	399		−31.3%
1920	538		34.8%
1930	521		−3.2%
1940	597		14.6%
1950	572		−4.2%
1960	539		−5.8%
1970	636		18.0%
1980	646		1.6%
1990	652		0.9%
2000	659		1.1%
2010	642		−2.6%
2020	694		8.1%
U.S. Decennial Census

=== 2010 census ===
As of the census of 2010, there were 642 people, 306 households, and 174 families residing in the town. The population density was 629.4 inhabitants per square mile (243.0/km^{2}). There were 376 housing units at an average density of 368.6 per square mile (142.3/km^{2}). The racial makeup of the town was 95.3% White, 0.3% African American, 0.5% Native American, 0.5% Asian, 0.5% from other races, and 3.0% from two or more races. Hispanic or Latino of any race were 1.1% of the population.

There were 306 households, of which 23.2% had children under the age of 18 living with them, 45.1% were married couples living together, 8.8% had a female householder with no husband present, 2.9% had a male householder with no wife present, and 43.1% were non-families. 40.2% of all households were made up of individuals, and 20.9% had someone living alone who was 65 years of age or older. The average household size was 1.99 and the average family size was 2.66.

The median age in the town was 53.1 years. 19.2% of residents were under the age of 18; 2.6% were between the ages of 18 and 24; 17.3% were from 25 to 44; 32% were from 45 to 64; and 29% were 65 years of age or older. The gender makeup of the town was 45.3% male and 54.7% female.

=== 2000 census ===
As of the census of 2000, there were 659 people, 302 households, and 170 families residing in the town. The population density was 643.4 inhabitants per square mile (248.4/km^{2}). There were 365 housing units at an average density of 356.3 per square mile (137.6/km^{2}). The racial makeup of the town was 95.14% White, 0.15% African American, 1.06% Native American, 1.67% from other races, and 1.97% from two or more races. Hispanic or Latino of any race were 1.67% of the population.

There were 302 households, out of which 22.8% had children under the age of 18 living with them, 49.0% were married couples living together, 5.3% had a female householder with no husband present, and 43.7% were non-families. 39.4% of all households were made up of individuals, and 24.8% had someone living alone who was 65 years of age or older. The average household size was 2.07 and the average family size was 2.78.

In the town, the population was spread out, with 20.5% under the age of 18, 3.8% from 18 to 24, 20.5% from 25 to 44, 26.4% from 45 to 64, and 28.8% who were 65 years of age or older. The median age was 48 years. For every 100 females there were 85.6 males. For every 100 females age 18 and over, there were 77.0 males.

The median income for a household in the town was $21,118, and the median income for a family was $26,563. Males had a median income of $27,639 versus $15,000 for females. The per capita income for the town was $15,369. About 22.0% of families and 25.1% of the population were below the poverty line, including 43.2% of those under age 18 and 13.1% of those age 65 or over.

== Government ==
Sheridan has a mayor and four council members. Brandy Tudor was elected mayor in 2025. She replaced Robert Stump who did not seek re-election. Stump originally stepped down as mayor in 2022. He returned to the position in August 2024 due to mayoral turnover after the election.

== Education ==
The town is in the Sheridan Elementary School District and the Sheridan High School District. Both Sheridan elementary and high school districts are components of Sheridan Public Schools. Sheridan Public Schools educates students from kindergarten through 12th grade. Sheridan High School's team name is the Panthers.

Sheridan Public Library serves the area.

== Media ==
The Madisonian is a newspaper serving the Madison and Ruby Valleys, which includes Sheridan. It is printed weekly and offers an e-edition.
