= List of mountains in Madison County, Montana =

There are at least 126 named mountains in Madison County, Montana.

- A P A Mountain, 45°35′34″N 112°07′17″W, el. 10,390 feet (3,170 m)
- Bald Mountain, location unknown, el. 6,565 feet (2,001 m)
- Baldy Mountain, 45°11′23″N 111°57′42″W, el. 9,616 feet (2,931 m)
- Beaverhead Rock, 45°23′11″N 112°27′35″W, el. 5,194 feet (1,583 m)
- Bell Peak, 45°29′51″N 112°36′53″W, el. 7,864 feet (2,397 m)
- Big Horn Mountain, 44°55′25″N 111°47′58″W, el. 10,256 feet (3,126 m)
- Big Mountain, 45°41′37″N 112°28′31″W, el. 8,799 feet (2,682 m)
- Big Sheep Mountain, 45°38′36″N 112°23′41″W, el. 7,172 feet (2,186 m)
- Black Butte, 44°54′16″N 111°51′18″W, el. 10,489 feet (3,197 m)
- Black Mountain, 45°09′48″N 111°31′46″W, el. 8,583 feet (2,616 m)
- Blaze Mountain, 45°22′05″N 111°24′43″W, el. 10,262 feet (3,128 m)
- Block Mountain, 45°28′12″N 112°33′02″W, el. 5,981 feet (1,823 m)
- Branham Peaks, 45°33′23″N 111°59′32″W, el. 9,698 feet (2,956 m)
- Brownback Mountain, 45°42′56″N 112°02′46″W, el. 9,163 feet (2,793 m)
- Bucks Nest, 45°00′36″N 111°44′47″W, el. 8,382 feet (2,555 m)
- Bulldog Mountain, 45°39′33″N 112°20′51″W, el. 6,489 feet (1,978 m)
- Cascade Mountain, 44°47′53″N 111°50′01″W, el. 9,367 feet (2,855 m)
- Cave Mountain, 44°54′16″N 111°45′58″W, el. 9,921 feet (3,024 m)
- Cedar Mountain, 45°13′41″N 111°31′46″W, el. 10,718 feet (3,267 m)
- Circle Mountain, 45°07′49″N 111°27′31″W, el. 8,448 feet (2,575 m)
- Cloudrest Peak, 45°32′49″N 112°04′21″W, el. 10,006 feet (3,050 m)
- Copper Mountain, 45°25′31″N 112°02′25″W, el. 7,293 feet (2,223 m)
- Dead Mountain, 45°42′16″N 112°02′49″W, el. 8,858 feet (2,700 m)
- Divide Peakl, 44°48′33″N 111°46′53″W, el. 9,521 feet (2,902 m)
- Dougherty Butte, 45°39′45″N 112°29′54″W, el. 6,699 feet (2,042 m)
- Dry Lake Mountains, 45°47′08″N 112°02′02″W, el. 6,024 feet (1,836 m)
- Dutchman Peak, 44°55′51″N 111°27′39″W, el. 10,850 feet (3,310 m)
- East Butte, 45°43′30″N 111°56′13″W, el. 6,575 feet (2,004 m)
- Echo Peak, 44°56′32″N 111°27′46″W, el. 8,895 feet (2,711 m)
- Elk Mountain, 45°33′27″N 111°28′14″W, el. 6,614 feet (2,016 m)
- Fan Mountain, 45°17′53″N 111°31′27″W, el. 10,253 feet (3,125 m)
- Finger Mountain, 44°58′55″N 111°29′35″W, el. 10,692 feet (3,259 m)
- Flatiron Mountain, 44°50′17″N 111°39′17″W, el. 8,104 feet (2,470 m)
- Flatiron Mountain, 44°58′17″N 111°47′13″W, el. 9,895 feet (3,016 m)
- Flattop Mountain, 45°11′42″N 111°23′13″W, el. 9,255 feet (2,821 m)
- Fossil Peak, 44°47′38″N 111°51′36″W, el. 8,937 feet (2,724 m)
- Freezeout Mountain, 44°50′40″N 111°43′31″W, el. 9,586 feet (2,922 m)
- Gallatin Peak, 45°22′06″N 111°21′57″W, el. 10,997 feet (3,352 m)
- Gold Butte, 44°53′27″N 111°37′58″W, el. 7,270 feet (2,220 m)
- Gold Hill, 45°46′54″N 112°06′07″W, el. 5,617 feet (1,712 m)
- Granite Mountain, 44°54′25″N 111°42′27″W, el. 9,085 feet (2,769 m)
- Granite Peak, 45°33′56″N 112°02′35″W, el. 10,558 feet (3,218 m)
- Grassy Mountain, 45°41′52″N 112°27′50″W, el. 8,583 feet (2,616 m)
- Hilgard Peak, 44°55′00″N 111°27′35″W, el. 11,184 feet (3,409 m)
- Hogback Mountain, 44°53′40″N 112°07′26″W, el. 10,577 feet (3,224 m)
- Hollowtop Mountain, 45°36′44″N 112°00′32″W, el. 10,551 feet (3,216 m)
- Horse Hill, 45°10′37″N 111°52′56″W, el. 7,858 feet (2,395 m)
- Horse Mountain, 45°35′37″N 112°00′21″W, el. 10,069 feet (3,069 m)
- Imp Peak, 44°59′30″N 111°27′09″W, el. 11,106 feet (3,385 m)
- Ironrod Hills, 45°39′55″N 112°20′20″W, el. 5,905 feet (1,800 m)
- Kid Mountain, 45°29′51″N 111°56′01″W, el. 9,019 feet (2,749 m)
- Koch Peak, 45°02′13″N 111°27′36″W, el. 11,181 feet (3,408 m)
- Lady of the Lake Peak, 45°30′54″N 111°58′06″W, el. 10,203 feet (3,110 m)
- Lakeshore Mountain, 45°35′44″N 112°06′36″W, el. 10,430 feet (3,180 m)
- Lava Mountain, 45°34′50″N 112°10′02″W, el. 9,252 feet (2,820 m)
- Lazyman Hill, 44°59′02″N 111°51′30″W, el. 9,459 feet (2,883 m)
- Leggat Mountain, 45°30′45″N 112°00′48″W, el. 10,023 feet (3,055 m)
- Lion Mountain, 44°52′52″N 111°47′44″W, el. 10,115 feet (3,083 m)
- Little Granite Peak, 45°34′28″N 112°02′00″W, el. 10,118 feet (3,084 m)
- Little Sheep Mountain, 45°37′44″N 112°24′49″W, el. 6,857 feet (2,090 m)
- Lobo Mesa, 44°48′09″N 111°46′03″W, el. 9,344 feet (2,848 m)
- London Hills, 45°47′55″N 111°51′47″W, el. 6,033 feet (1,839 m)
- London Peak, 45°48′54″N 111°53′57″W, el. 6,332 feet (1,930 m)
- Lone Mountain, 45°16′41″N 111°27′01″W, el. 11,145 feet (3,397 m)
- Lonesome Peak, 45°33′03″N 112°01′00″W, el. 10,328 feet (3,148 m)
- Long Mountain, 45°32′38″N 112°00′52″W, el. 9,964 feet (3,037 m)
- Maltbys Mound, 45°35′46″N 111°46′34″W, el. 5,764 feet (1,757 m)
- Manhead Mountain, 45°39′56″N 112°04′28″W, el. 9,921 feet (3,024 m)
- Marmot Mountain, 44°58′44″N 111°49′05″W, el. 9,649 feet (2,941 m)
- McCartney Mountain, 45°31′45″N 112°37′32″W, el. 8,087 feet (2,465 m)
- Middle Mountain, 45°35′16″N 112°03′07″W, el. 10,200 feet (3,100 m)
- Mine Peak, 45°33′23″N 111°59′31″W, el. 9,701 feet (2,957 m)
- Monument Hill, 44°52′00″N 111°51′36″W, el. 9,564 feet (2,915 m)
- Moose Butte, 44°59′07″N 111°23′12″W, el. 9,386 feet (2,861 m)
- Mount Bradley, 45°31′11″N 111°58′34″W, el. 10,308 feet (3,142 m)
- Mount Carey, 44°50′41″N 112°04′28″W, el. 9,544 feet (2,909 m)
- Mount Jackson, 45°35′27″N 112°06′12″W, el. 10,384 feet (3,165 m)
- Mount Jefferson, 45°36′14″N 112°00′27″W, el. 10,115 feet (3,083 m)
- No Man Peak, 45°04′07″N 111°30′33″W, el. 10,777 feet (3,285 m)
- Noble Peak, 45°33′52″N 112°03′40″W, el. 10,325 feet (3,147 m)
- Nutters Cathedral Peak, 45°02′06″N 111°28′03″W, el. 10,013 feet (3,052 m)
- Old Baldy Mountain, 45°33′52″N 112°08′56″W, el. 9,875 feet (3,010 m)
- Olson Peak, 44°52′09″N 112°08′22″W, el. 10,433 feet (3,180 m)
- Pioneer Mountain, 45°13′53″N 111°27′05″W, el. 9,793 feet (2,985 m)
- Point of Rocks, 45°46′46″N 112°07′08″W, el. 5,971 feet (1,820 m)
- Point of Rocks, 45°23′05″N 112°27′35″W, el. 5,167 feet (1,575 m)
- Porphyry Mountain, 45°28′29″N 111°56′32″W, el. 10,085 feet (3,074 m)
- Potosi Peak, 45°35′16″N 111°58′56″W, el. 10,131 feet (3,088 m)
- Queens Hill, 45°39′25″N 111°58′28″W, el. 8,356 feet (2,547 m)
- Ramshorn Mountain, 45°27′59″N 111°56′43″W, el. 10,193 feet (3,107 m)
- Red Hill, 44°57′53″N 111°52′10″W, el. 9,485 feet (2,891 m)
- Red Knob, 45°27′17″N 111°35′32″W, el. 8,022 feet (2,445 m)
- Red Mountain, 45°44′41″N 112°28′42″W, el. 10,023 feet (3,055 m)
- Red Mountain, 45°37′16″N 111°34′49″W, el. 5,738 feet (1,749 m)
- Sentinel Peak, 44°58′24″N 111°25′31″W, el. 10,810 feet (3,290 m)
- Shedhorn Mountain, 45°05′35″N 111°25′45″W, el. 9,908 feet (3,020 m)
- Sheep Mountain, 44°46′53″N 111°23′55″W, el. 10,200 feet (3,100 m)
- Sheep Mountain, 45°07′20″N 111°57′58″W, el. 9,685 feet (2,952 m)
- Silica Butte, 45°41′43″N 112°25′04″W, el. 6,942 feet (2,116 m)
- Skihi Peak, 45°31′48″N 112°05′31″W, el. 9,468 feet (2,886 m)
- Sliderock Mountain, 44°56′34″N 112°03′08″W, el. 10,308 feet (3,142 m)
- Smelter Mountain, 45°36′11″N 112°09′28″W, el. 8,602 feet (2,622 m)
- Snowcrest Mountain, 45°00′00″N 112°01′01″W, el. 8,989 feet (2,740 m)
- South Baldy Mountain, 45°28′16″N 111°54′56″W, el. 10,095 feet (3,077 m)
- Specimen Butte, 44°59′29″N 111°47′42″W, el. 9,741 feet (2,969 m)
- Sphinx Mountain, 45°09′26″N 111°28′50″W, el. 10,840 feet (3,300 m)
- Spuhler Peak, 45°34′15″N 112°05′02″W, el. 10,213 feet (3,113 m)
- Spur Mountain, 44°56′53″N 112°04′09″W, el. 10,003 feet (3,049 m)
- Stonehouse Mountain, 44°50′58″N 112°05′55″W, el. 10,056 feet (3,065 m)
- Strawberry Butte, 44°57′07″N 111°52′49″W, el. 9,039 feet (2,755 m)
- Sugar Loaf Mountain, 45°34′47″N 111°50′17″W, el. 7,116 feet (2,169 m)
- Sunrise Peak, 45°34′30″N 112°05′39″W, el. 9,924 feet (3,025 m)
- Sunset Peak, 44°51′22″N 112°08′48″W, el. 10,548 feet (3,215 m)
- Table Mountain, 45°10′03″N 112°12′32″W, el. 6,266 feet (1,910 m)
- Table Mountain, 45°44′32″N 112°27′43″W, el. 10,213 feet (3,113 m)
- Taylor Peaks, 45°02′14″N 111°27′32″W, el. 11,247 feet (3,428 m)
- The Helmet, 45°09′56″N 111°30′02″W, el. 9,449 feet (2,880 m)
- The Horn, 44°46′22″N 111°29′47″W, el. 6,814 feet (2,077 m)
- Thompson Peak, 45°31′46″N 112°01′16″W, el. 10,325 feet (3,147 m)
- Wallace Peak, 45°34′32″N 111°49′21″W, el. 6,434 feet (1,961 m)
- Ward Peak, 45°29′09″N 111°55′07″W, el. 10,098 feet (3,078 m)
- West Peak, 45°44′01″N 112°29′03″W, el. 9,659 feet (2,944 m)
- Windy Hill, 44°51′05″N 111°46′11″W, el. 9,646 feet (2,940 m)
- Woodward Mountain, 45°00′35″N 111°24′53″W, el. 10,512 feet (3,204 m)
- Woodward Mountain, 45°00′34″N 111°24′51″W, el. 10,649 feet (3,246 m)

== See also ==
- List of mountains in Montana
- List of mountain ranges in Montana
