= Black Butte =

Black Butte may refer to:

== Places ==
- Black Butte (Glenn County, California), a mountain in the Northern Coast Ranges, California
- Black Butte (Siskiyou County, California), a volcano in California
- Black Butte (Colorado), a mountain in Baca County, Colorado
- Black Butte (Stillwater County, Montana), a mountain in Stillwater County, Montana
- Black Butte (Madison County, Montana), a peak in the Gravelly Range, Montana
- Black Butte (Clark County, Nevada), a summit in Mesquite Valley, Nevada
- Black Butte (South Virgin Mountains), a summit northwest of Bitter Ridge in Clark County, Nevada
- Black Butte (Oregon), a volcano in Deschutes County
  - Black Butte Ranch, Oregon, a planned community in Deschutes County
- Black Butte, Oregon, a former community in Lane County

== Other uses ==
- Black Butte Porter, a beer by Deschutes Brewery

== See also ==
- Black Buttes, an extinct stratovolcano in Washington state
- List of peaks named Black Butte
