= Helmet (disambiguation) =

A helmet is a protective headgear.

Helmet or The Helmet may also refer to:

== Arts and entertainment ==
- Helmet (band), an American alternative metal band
- Helmet (film), a 2021 Indian comedy film
- Helmet (Game & Watch), a 1981 video game
- "Helmet" (New Girl), a 2016 television episode
- "The Helmet" (The Amazing World of Gumball), a 2012 television episode

== Places ==
- Helmet, Virginia, US
- Helmet Airport, British Columbia, Canada
- Helmet Peak (disambiguation), several peaks
- The Helmet (British Columbia), mountain peak in British Columbia, Canada
- The Helmet (mountain), Montana, US
- The Helmet (Oceanus Procellarum), a geological feature on the Moon
- Helmet, a borough in southern Estonia, today Helme

== Other uses ==
- Helmet (heraldry), an element of a coat of arms
- Helmet pigeon, a variety of fancy pigeon
- Helsinki Metropolitan Area Libraries (HelMet), a library network in Finland
