= Cedar Mountain (Montana) =

Mountain in Madison County, Montana, United States

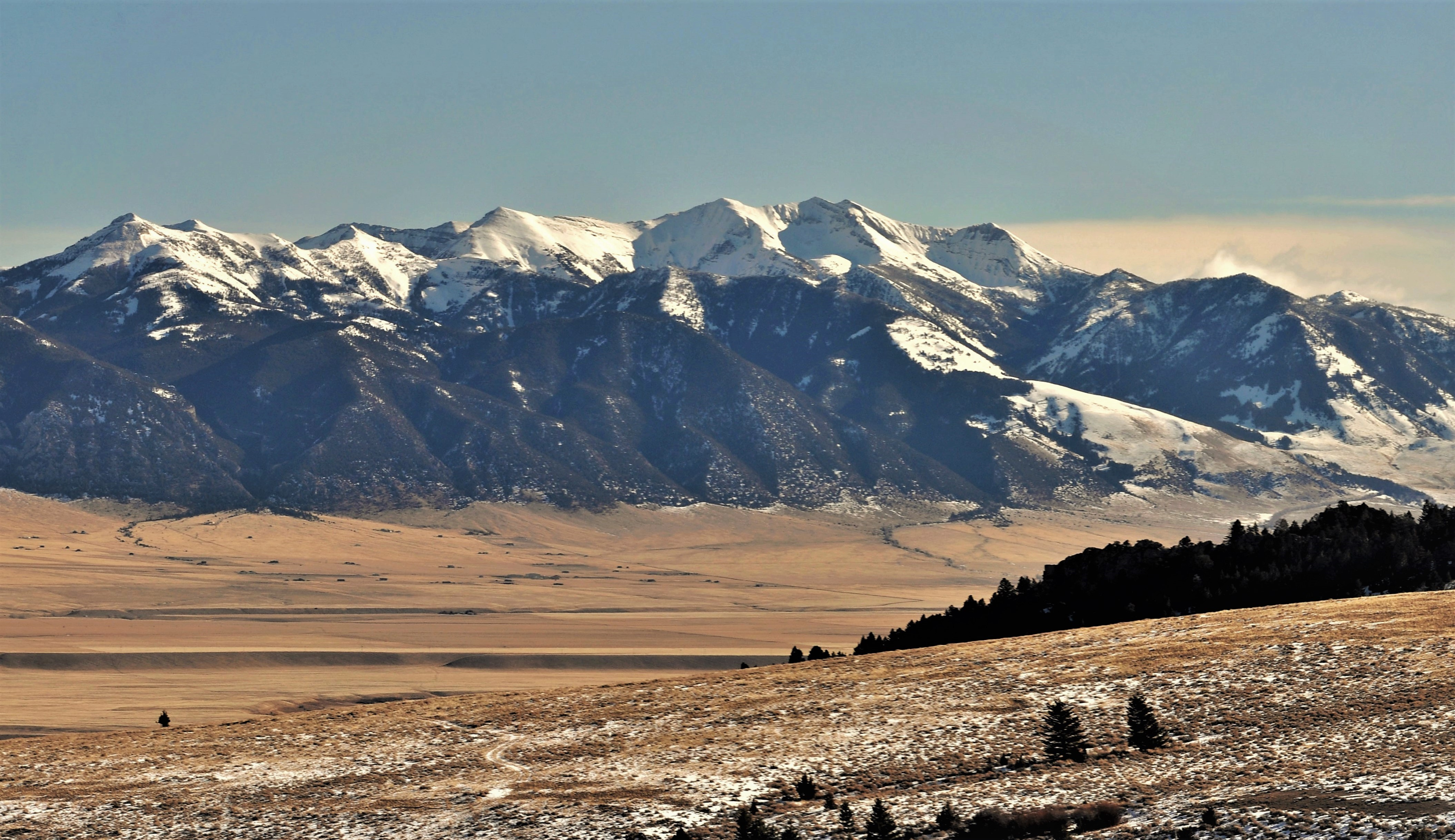
- West aspect

Highest point
- Elevation: 10,780 ft (3,286 m)
- Prominence: 1,932 ft (589 m)
- Parent peak: Sphinx Mountain (10,840 ft)
- Isolation: 5.18 mi (8.34 km)
- Coordinates: 45°13′36″N 111°30′42″W

Geography
- Location within Montana Location within the United States
- Country: United States
- State: Montana
- County: Madison County
- Protected area: Lee Metcalf Wilderness
- Parent range: Rocky Mountains; Madison Range
- Topo map: USGS Lake Cameron

Cedar Mountain is a 10,780-foot (3,286-metre) summit located in Madison County, Montana, United States.

== Description ==
Cedar Mountain is located in the Madison Range which is a subrange of the Rocky Mountains. It is situated 13 miles (21 km) southeast of Ennis, Montana, and 36 miles (58 km) southwest of Bozeman. The peak is set within the Lee Metcalf Wilderness on land managed by Beaverhead–Deerlodge National Forest. The mountain has an east peak (10,768-ft), as well as the 10,780-ft west summit which both rise above a large cirque containing Cedar Lake and Cedar Falls. Precipitation runoff from the mountain drains west to the Madison River via Cedar, Mill, and Bear creeks. Topographic relief is significant as the summit rises 1,260 feet (380 meters) above Cedar Lake in 0.6 mile (1.0 km) and 5,400 feet (1,600 meters) above the Madison Valley in 6.5 miles (10.5 km). The mountain's toponym has been officially adopted by the United States Board on Geographic Names.

== Climate ==
Based on the Köppen climate classification, Cedar Mountain is located in a subarctic climate zone characterized by long, usually very cold winters, and short, cool to mild summers. Winter temperatures can drop below −10 °F with wind chill factors below −30 °F.

== See also ==
- Geology of the Rocky Mountains
- Mountains of Madison County, Montana
