= Imp Peak =

Mountain in the state of Montana

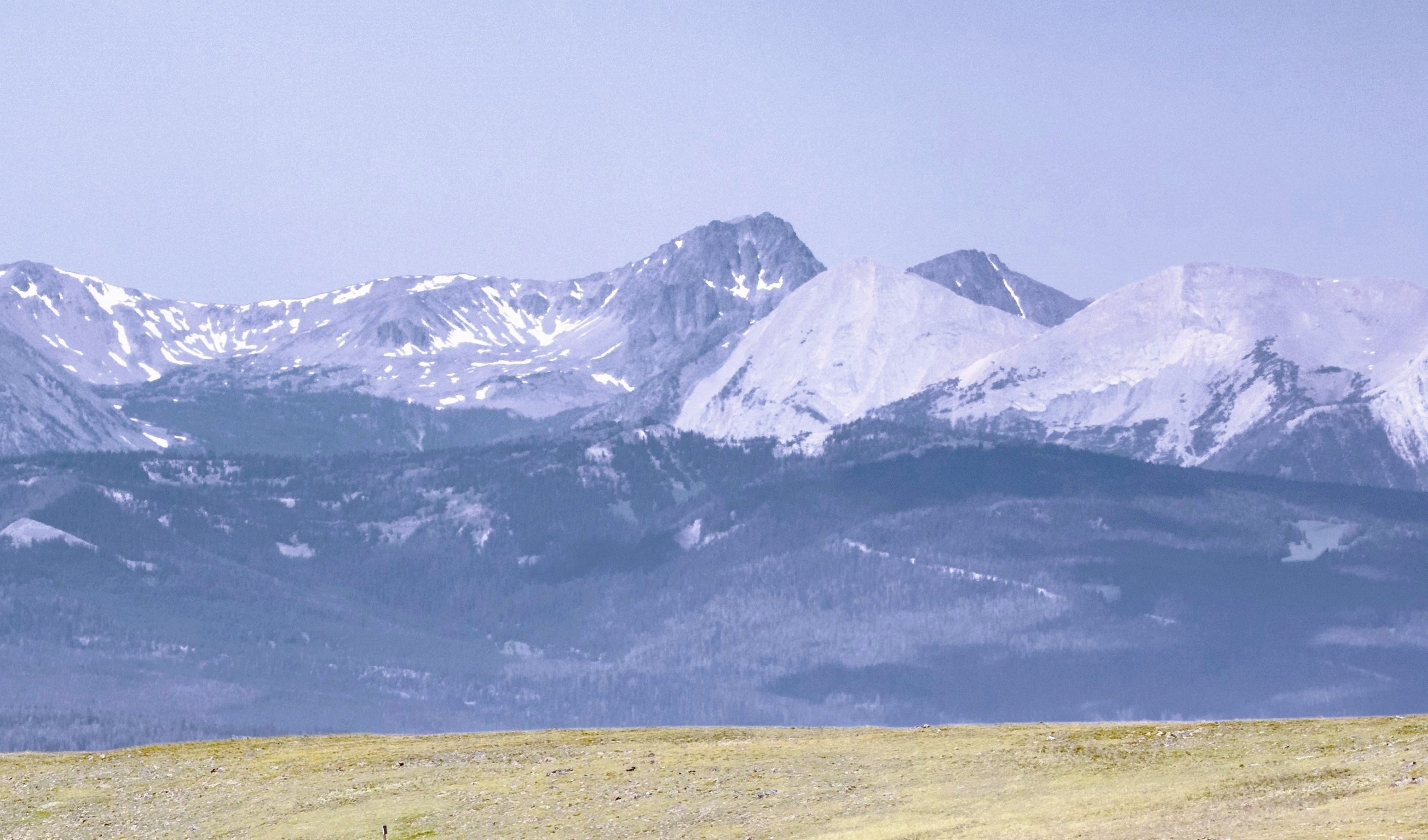
- East aspect, centered on skyline

Highest point
- Elevation: 11,207 ft (3,416 m)
- Prominence: 1,002 ft (305 m)
- Coordinates: 44°59′30″N 111°27′09″W

Geography
- Location within Montana Location within the United States
- Location: Madison County, Montana, U.S.
- Parent range: Madison Range
- Topo map(s): USGS Hilgard Peak, MT

Climbing
- Easiest route: Scramble

Imp Peak (11,207 feet (3,416 m)) is in the Madison Range in the U.S. state of Montana. The summit is located in Lee Metcalf Wilderness within Gallatin and Beaverhead-Deerlodge National Forests. Echo Peak is 3.1 mi (5.0 km) south of Koch Peak.
