= Sphinx Mountain (Madison County, Montana) =

Mountain in Montana, United States

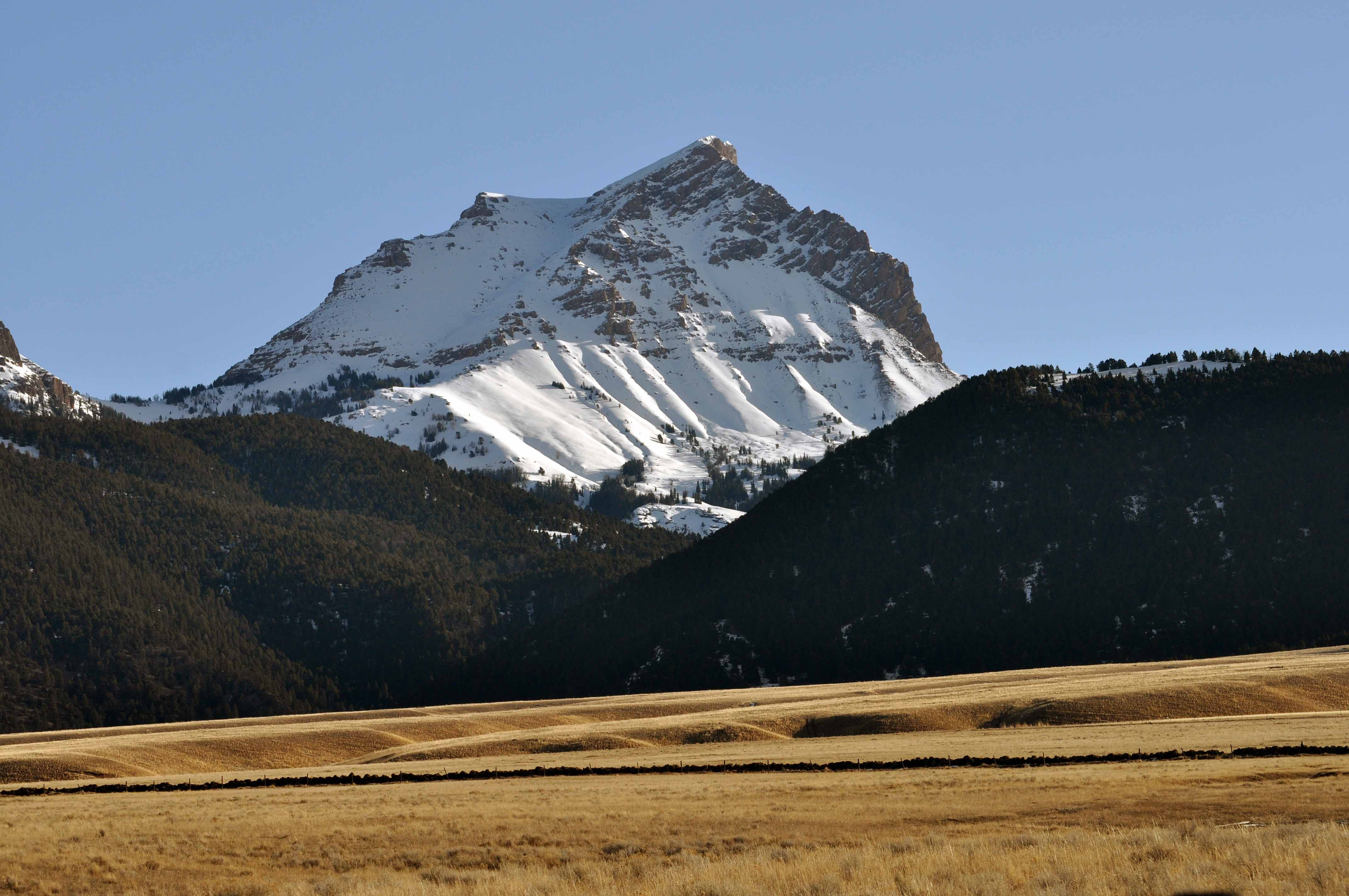
- Sphinx Mountain

Highest point
- Elevation: 10,840 feet (3,300 m)
- Prominence: 2,076 feet (633 m)
- Isolation: 8.21 miles (13.21 km)
- Coordinates: 45°09′26″N 111°28′50″W,

Geography
- Location within Montana
- Location: Madison County, Montana
- Parent range: Madison Range

Sphinx Mountain, el. 10,840 feet (3,300 m) is a prominent mountain peak on the western face of the Madison Range in Madison County, Montana. The peak is located in the Beaverhead National Forest and Taylor Hilgard parcel of the Lee Metcalf Wilderness area. Its prominence and isolation makes it easy to distinguish from Ennis in the Madison River valley.

Bear and Indian creeks are tributaries of the Madison River with headwaters on the eastern and northern face of Sphinx Mountain.

== Ascents ==
The first recorded ascent was on July 30, 1913, by Anton W. Asmuth, George Belchic, Stanley H. Wardwell, and someone named Kimball who were students from the Harvard Summer School of Geology. A second recorded ascent was made on August 1, 1919 by R. B. Hevy, John H. Hall Jr., Robert E. Crosby, and Henry J. Hall Jr., also Harvard students. Sphinx Mountain may have been ascended during the 1880s and 1890s by geologists Frank Tweedy, Edward Douglas and or Albert C. Peale during their topographic surveys of the Three Forks quadrangle.

The first recorded winter ascent was made in December 1964 by Kit Jones and James W. Clark and has been a popular winter climb ever since.

== Geology ==
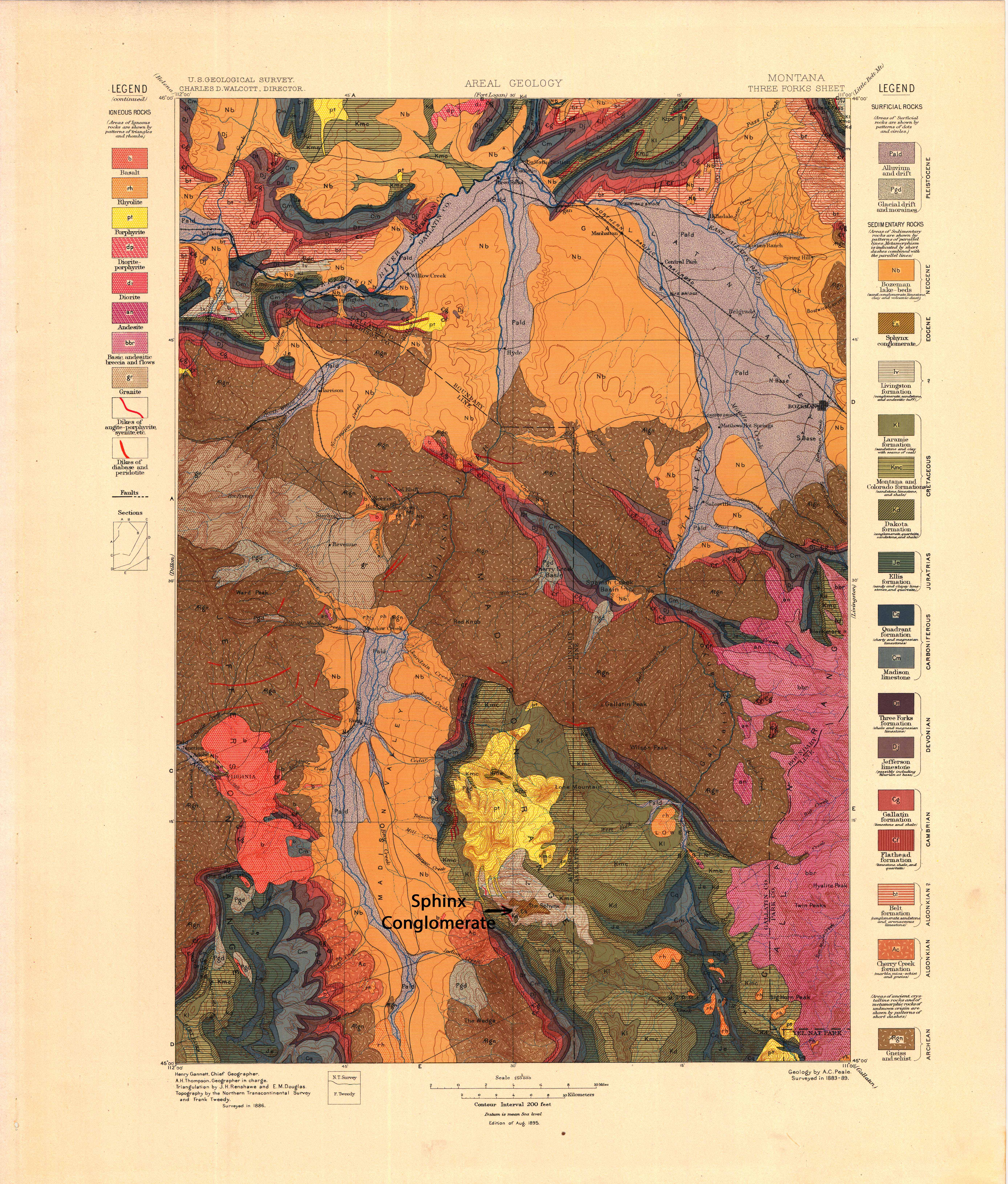
Areal geological map of Madison range with Sphinx Conglomerate annotated

Sphinx Mountain is of interest to geologists as it exposes an unusual formation known as the Sphinx Conglomerate (Eocene) which overlays the Livingston Formation (Late Cretaceous). The conglomerate is found only on Sphinx Mountain and the adjacent peak, The Helmet. It was first identified by geologist A. C. Peale during geological surveys of the region in the 1880s.

== See also ==
- Mountains in Madison County, Montana
