= West Peak (Madison County, Montana) =

Mountain in Montana, United States

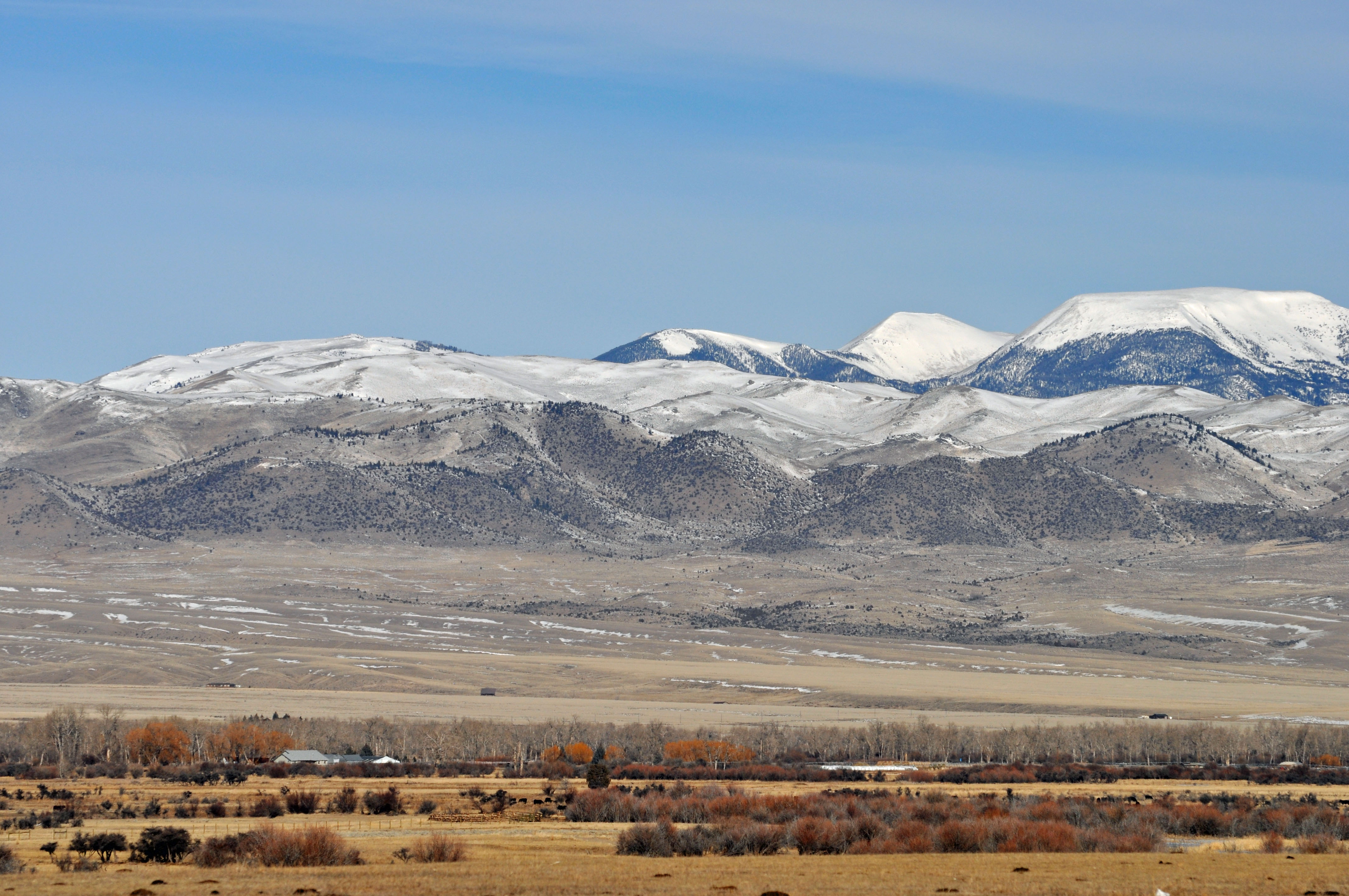
- West Peak (center) near Table Mountain

Highest point
- Elevation: 9,659 feet (2,944 m)
- Coordinates: 45°44′01″N 112°29′03″W

Geography
- Location within Montana
- Location: Madison County, Montana
- Parent range: Highland Mountains

West Peak, el. 9,659 feet (2,944 m), is a mountain peak in the Highland Mountains in Madison County, Montana. It rises due west from Table Mountain in the same range. The peak is located in the Deerlodge National Forest. The headwaters of Hell's Canyon Creek, a significant tributary of the Jefferson River flow off the southeast face of the peak.

== See also ==
- Mountains of Madison County, Montana
