= Lone Mountain (Montana) =

Mountain in the state of Montana

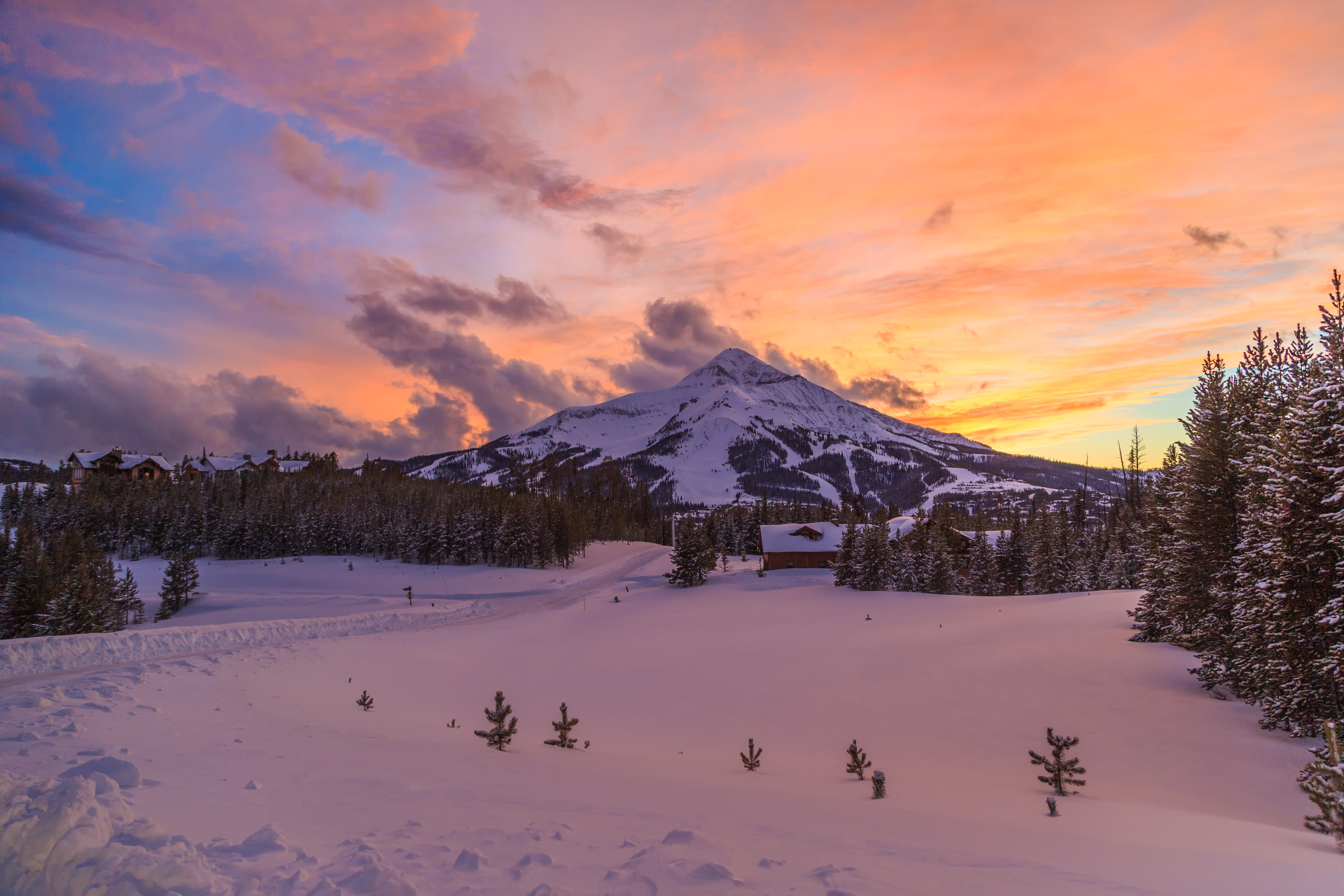
- Lone Mountain, seen from Big Sky, Montana

Highest point
- Elevation: 11,167 ft (3,404 m)
- Prominence: 2,722 ft (830 m)
- Coordinates: 45°16′41″N 111°27′01″W

Geography
- Location within Montana Location within the United States
- Location: Madison County, Montana, U.S.
- Parent range: Madison Range
- Topo map(s): USGS Lone Mountain, MT

Geology
- Mountain type: Laccolith

Climbing
- Easiest route: Scramble

Lone Mountain (11,167 feet (3,404 m)) is in the Madison Range in the U.S. state of Montana. The summit is located in Lee Metcalf Wilderness within Gallatin and Beaverhead-Deerlodge National Forests. Lone Mountain is 16.63 mi (26.76 km) north of Koch Peak.

== Geology ==
The mountain's rock is igneous in nature, but its magma did not reach the surface, so it is considered the laccolith rather than a true volcano.

== Recreation ==
The east, north, and southern slopes of Lone Peak are occupied by Big Sky Resort.

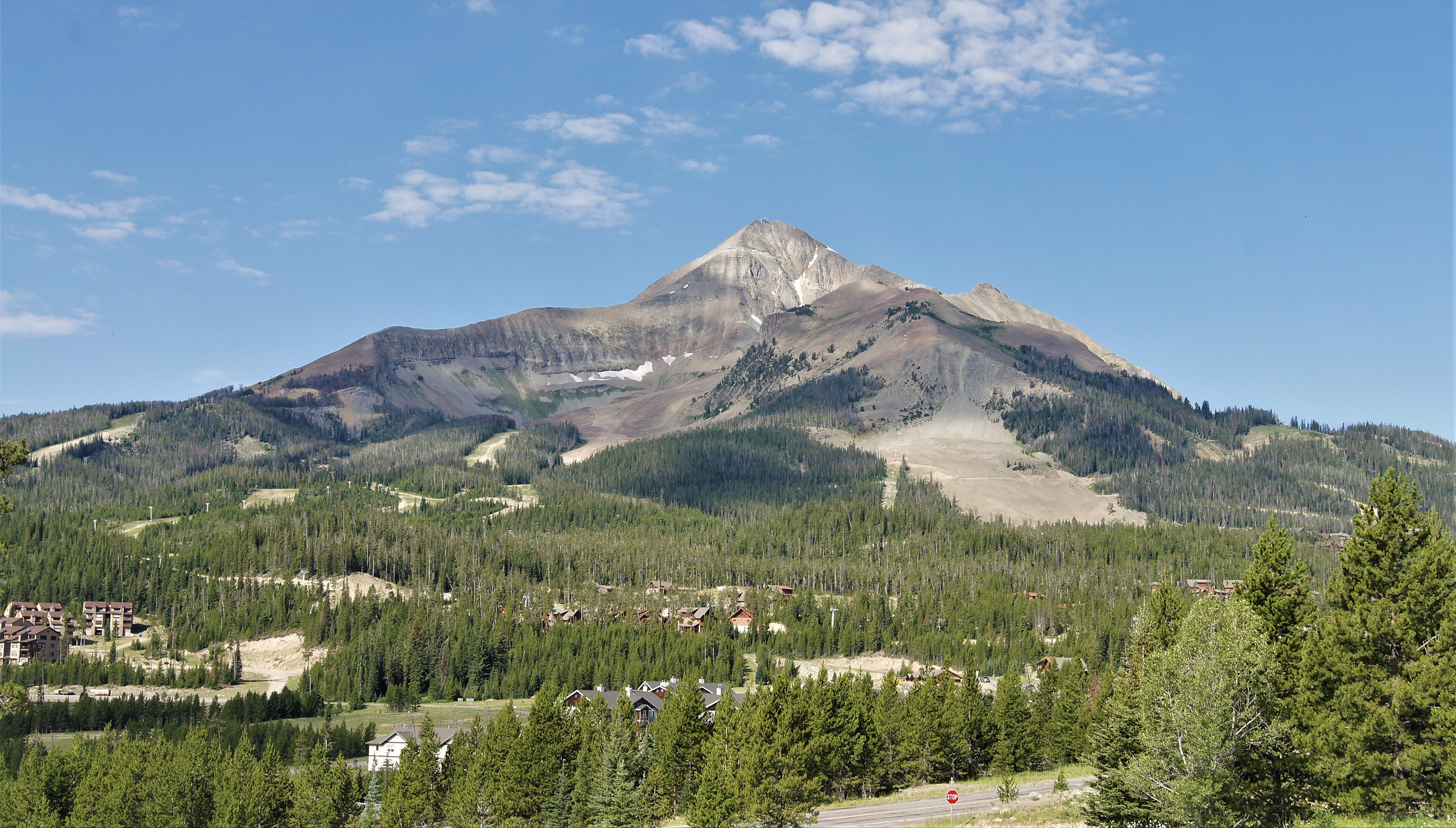
Lone Mountain above Big Sky, Montana

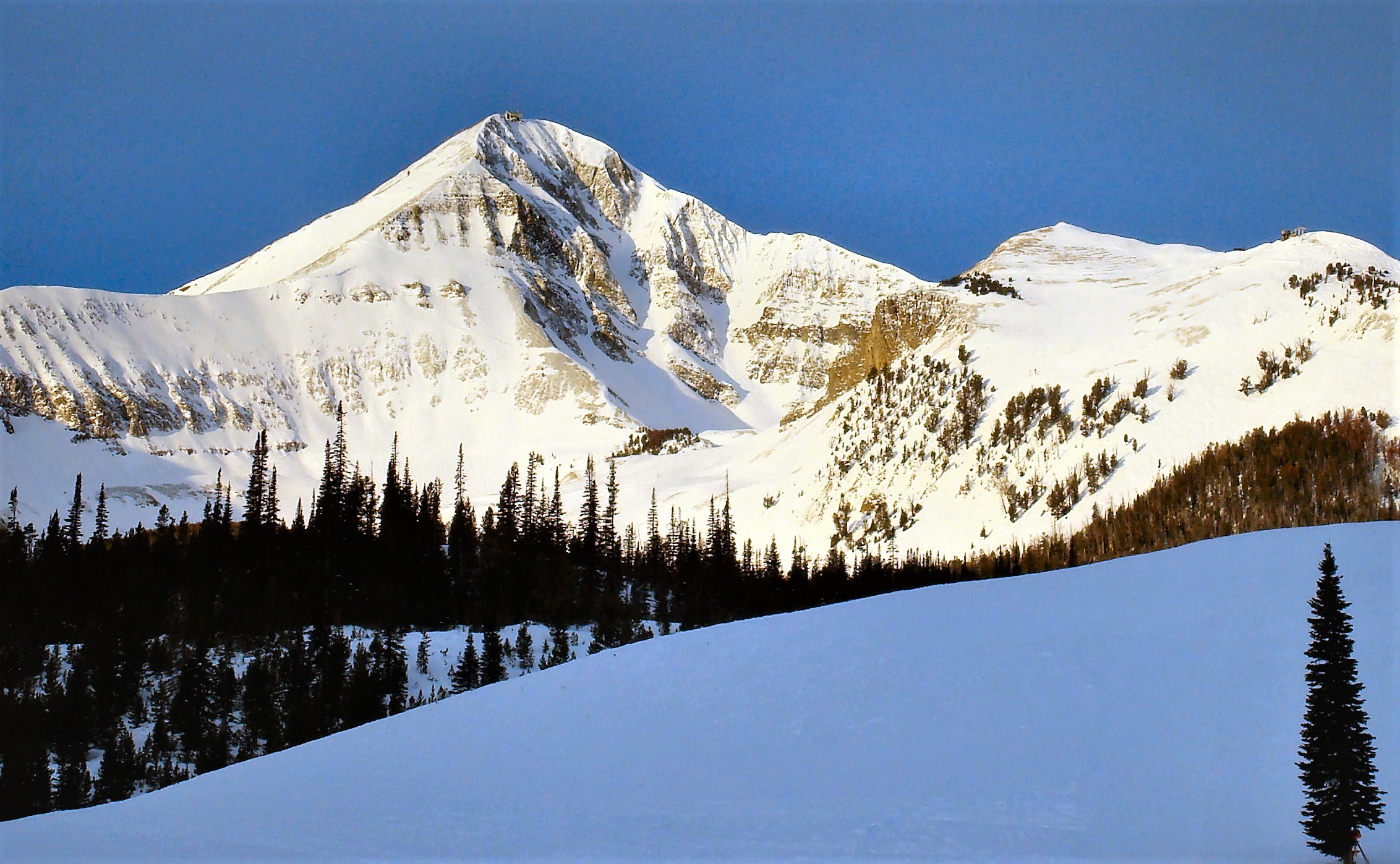
Lone Mountain in winter
