= Black Butte (Madison County, Montana) =

Mountain in Montana, United States

- Pyroxene Butte
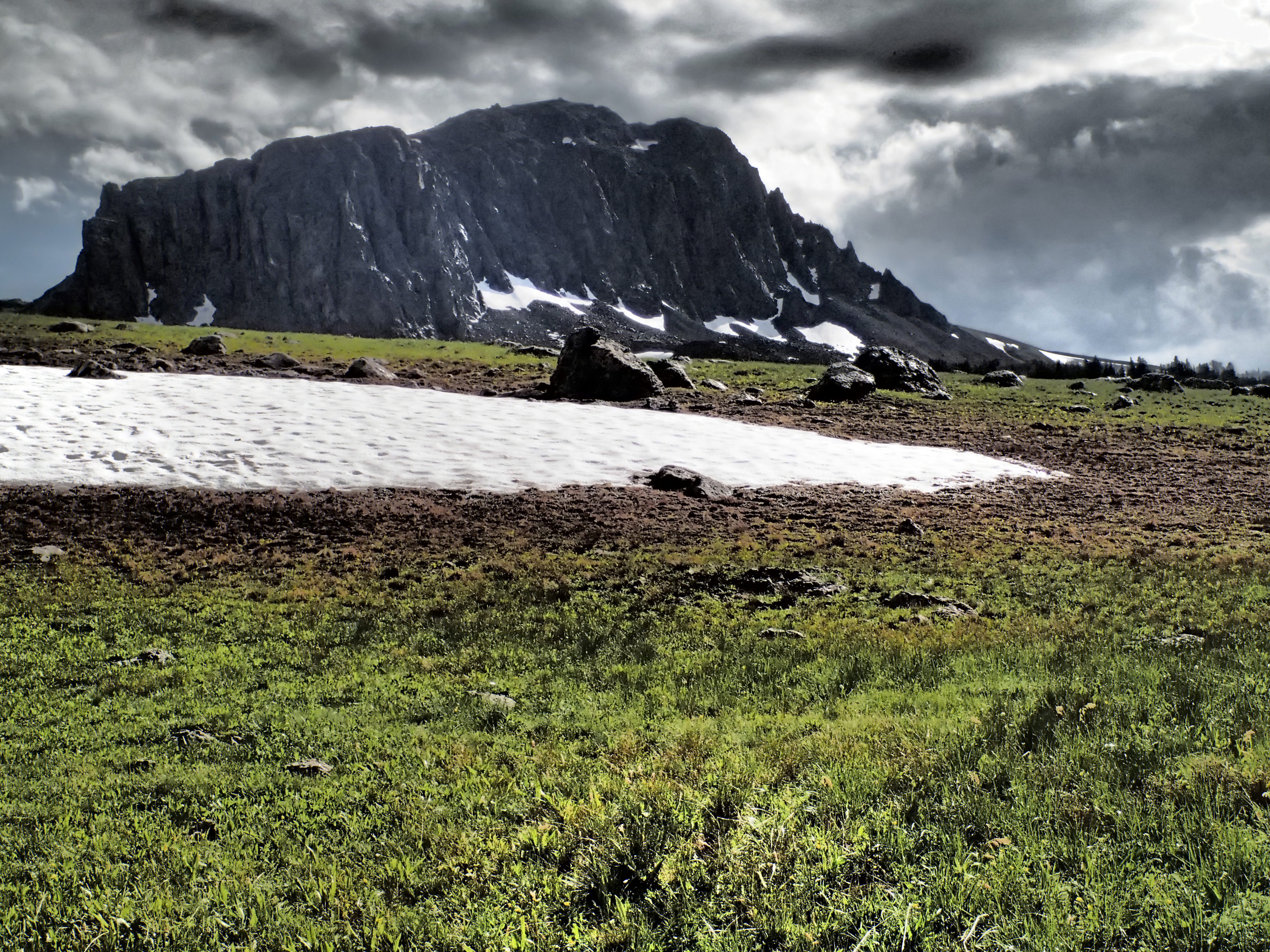
- Southeast face Black Butte

Highest point
- Elevation: 10,547 ft (3,215 m)
- Prominence: 3,182 ft (970 m)
- Coordinates: 44°54′16″N 111°51′18″W

Geography
- Location within Montana
- Location: Madison County, Montana
- Parent range: Gravelly Range
- Topo map: Big Horn Mountain

Geology
- Mountain type: Volcanic cone

Black Butte, el. 10,547 feet (3,215 m) is the highest peak in the Gravelly Range in Madison County, Montana. The eastern base of the peak is less than 1 mile (1.6 km) from the Beaverhead-Deerlodge National Forest road #290 (Gravelly Range Road).

== Geology ==
Black Butte is a remnant of what was once a volcanic cone. Due to its height, it is probably the third-highest volcanic peak in Montana, the second and first-highest being the laccoliths Lone Mountain and Koch Peak.

== See also ==
- Mountains in Madison County, Montana
