= List of peaks named Black Butte =

There are a large number of peaks named Black Butte in the United States, especially in the states of Arizona, California, Montana, and Nevada:

Name	USGS link	State	County	USGS map	Coordinates	Elevation	
Black Butte		Alaska	Northwest Arctic	Bendeleben D-3	65°45′40″N 163°14′15″W	1,955 ft	596 m
Black Butte		Arizona	Pima	Ben Nevis Mountain	32°03′33″N 112°13′01″W	2,825 ft	861 m
Black Butte		Arizona	Maricopa	Hat Mountain	32°42′35″N 112°40′49″W	1,693 ft	516 m
Black Butte		Arizona	Graham	Oak Grove Canyon	32°50′20″N 110°26′08″W	4,573 ft	1,394 m
Black Butte		Arizona	Pinal	Casa Grande East	32°56′46″N 111°39′31″W	1,785 ft	544 m
Black Butte		Arizona	Maricopa	Gillespie	33°15′01″N 112°57′03″W	1,470 ft	450 m
Black Cross Butte		Arizona	Maricopa	Horse Mesa Dam	33°31′03″N 111°16′16″W	4,774 ft	1,455 m
Black Cross Butte		Arizona	Maricopa	Horse Mesa Dam	33°33′55″N 111°21′31″W	3,340 ft	1,020 m
Black Butte		Arizona	Maricopa	Black Butte	33°50′35″N 113°01′07″W	3,527 ft	1,075 m
Black Butte		Arizona	Yavapai	Copperopolis	34°01′46″N 112°27′56″W	3,697 ft	1,127 m
Black Butte		Arizona	La Paz	Alamo Dam SE	34°04′36″N 113°32′55″W	2,346 ft	715 m
Black Butte		Arizona	Yavapai	Scratch Canyon	34°48′54″N 113°04′33″W	6,017 ft	1,834 m
Black Butte		Arizona	Mohave	Mohon Peak	34°56′25″N 113°22′11″W	5,295 ft	1,614 m
Black Butte		Arizona	Navajo	Five Buttes	35°17′50″N 110°05′59″W	6,299 ft	1,920 m
Black Butte		Arizona	Mohave	Mount Wilson	35°55′33″N 114°33′32″W	2,421 ft	738 m
Black Rock Butte		Arizona	Apache	Mummy Cave Ruins	36°08′45″N 109°17′47″W	7,241 ft	2,207 m
Black Butte		California	Los Angeles	El Mirage	34°33′24″N 117°43′22″W	3,586 ft	1,093 m
Black Butte		California	San Bernardino	Newberry Springs	34°51′15″N 116°41′33″W	1,975 ft	602 m
Black Butte		California	San Luis Obispo	Lopez Mountain	35°18′44″N 120°35′32″W	2,703 ft	824 m
Black Butte		California	Monterey	Chews Ridge	36°16′01″N 121°32′29″W	4,911 ft	1,497 m
Black Butte		California	San Joaquin	Tracy	37°39′10″N 121°28′42″W	1,086 ft	331 m
Black Butte		California	Alpine	Caples Lake	38°41′01″N 120°01′21″W	8,999 ft	2,743 m
Black Buttes		California	Nevada	English Mountain	39°23′42″N 120°33′28″W	7,982 ft	2,433 m
Black Butte		California	Glenn	Plaskett Meadows	39°43′36″N 122°52′20″W	7,388 ft	2,252 m
Black Butte		California	Tehama	Black Butte Dam	39°48′56″N 122°21′10″W	787 ft	240 m
Black Butte		California	Tehama	Finley Butte	40°15′23″N 121°46′45″W	3,435 ft	1,047 m
Mount Conard		California	Tehama	Lassen Peak	40°25′44″N 121°30′06″W	8,100 ft	2,500 m
Black Butte		California	Shasta	Shingletown	40°27′25″N 121°59′56″W	2,592 ft	790 m
Black Butte		California	Lassen	Bogard Buttes	40°32′36″N 121°13′42″W	7,989 ft	2,435 m
Black Butte		California	Humboldt	Owl Creek	40°33′46″N 123°54′37″W	3,169 ft	966 m
Prospect Peak		California	Shasta	Prospect Peak	40°34′23″N 121°20′45″W	8,327 ft	2,538 m
Black Butte		California	Humboldt	Showers Mountain	40°36′06″N 123°43′18″W	4,117 ft	1,255 m
Black Butte		California	Modoc	Halls Canyon	41°19′41″N 121°05′02″W	5,646 ft	1,721 m
Black Butte		California	Siskiyou	City of Mount Shasta	41°22′00″N 122°20′52″W	6,243 ft	1,903 m
Black Butte		California	Del Norte	Polar Bear Mountain	41°55′11″N 123°36′13″W	5,991 ft	1,826 m
Seven L Buttes		Colorado	Las Animas	Cobert Mesa North	37°06′12″N 103°30′07″W	6,548 ft	1,996 m
Black Butte		Colorado	Baca	Walsh	37°27′55″N 102°20′55″W	4,045 ft	1,233 m
Black Mountain		Idaho	Clearwater	Mallard Peak	46°52′44″N 115°33′08″W	7,057 ft	2,151 m
Black Butte		Idaho	Owyhee	Big Bend Crossing	42°16′58″N 115°05′42″W	5,384 ft	1,641 m
Black Butte		Idaho	Owyhee	Black Butte West	42°41′14″N 115°23′02″W	4,206 ft	1,282 m
Black Butte		Idaho	Owyhee	Pixley Basin	42°47′13″N 116°28′14″W	6,020 ft	1,830 m
Black Butte		Idaho	Owyhee	Jackass Butte	43°04′47″N 116°10′38″W	3,136 ft	956 m
Black Butte		Idaho	Lincoln	Summit Reservoir	43°08′07″N 114°28′40″W	5,079 ft	1,548 m
Black Butte		Idaho	Valley	Papoose Peak	45°10′53″N 114°51′02″W	8,691 ft	2,649 m
Black Butte		Idaho	Idaho	Johnson Butte	45°29′23″N 115°52′30″W	6,729 ft	2,051 m
Black Butte		Montana	Gallatin	Big Horn Peak	45°01′55″N 111°05′49″W	8,396 ft	2,559 m
Black Butte		Montana	Carbon	Bowler	45°11′23″N 108°44′35″W	5,148 ft	1,569 m
Black Butte		Montana	Carbon	Mackay Ranch	45°16′02″N 109°35′25″W	8,277 ft	2,523 m
Black Butte		Montana	Stillwater	Mount Wood	45°21′40″N 109°46′46″W	8,464 ft	2,580 m
Black Eagle Butte		Montana	Powder River	Bradshaw Creek	45°00′21″N 105°59′44″W	4,088 ft	1,246 m
Black Butte		Montana	Sweet Grass	Ross Canyon	45°40′13″N 109°59′44″W	6,119 ft	1,865 m
Charlie Black Butte		Montana	Rosebud	Badger Peak	45°40′50″N 106°33′05″W	4,295 ft	1,309 m
Black Butte		Montana	Jefferson	Black Butte	45°56′47″N 112°04′10″W	5,663 ft	1,726 m
Black Butte		Montana	Sweet Grass	Amelong Creek	46°03′46″N 110°10′26″W	7,677 ft	2,340 m
Black Butte		Montana	Broadwater	Sulphur Bar Creek	46°17′39″N 111°12′14″W	6,604 ft	2,013 m
Black Butte Mountain		Montana	Meagher	Black Butte Mountain	46°21′20″N 110°53′32″W	6,434 ft	1,961 m
Black Buttes		Montana	Rosebud	Box Canyon Coulee	46°25′25″N 106°27′17″W	2,999 ft	914 m
Black Butte		Montana	Broadwater	Gurnett Creek West	46°27′53″N 111°22′38″W	5,745 ft	1,751 m
Black Butte		Montana	Meagher	Strawberry Butte	46°46′41″N 110°56′28″W	6,775 ft	2,065 m
Mount Dean Stone		Montana	Missoula	Southeast Missoula	46°48′08″N 113°58′22″W	6,204 ft	1,891 m
Black Butte		Montana	Madison	Big Horn Mountain	44°54′16″N 111°51′18″W	10,489 ft	3,197 m
Black Butte		Montana	Garfield	McWilliams Springs	46°55′57″N 107°33′44″W	3,310 ft	1,010 m
Black Butte		Montana	Cascade	Calvert	47°07′46″N 111°13′13″W	6,339 ft	1,932 m
Black Butte		Montana	Fergus	Grass Range NW	47°14′08″N 108°58′13″W	5,535 ft	1,687 m
Black Butte		Montana	Cascade	Telegraph Mountain	47°17′09″N 111°52′41″W	5,276 ft	1,608 m
Black Buttes		Montana	Judith Basin	Byrne Creek	47°21′21″N 110°33′55″W	4,528 ft	1,380 m
Black Butte		Montana	Fergus	Wild Bill Flat West	47°28′40″N 109°45′00″W	3,487 ft	1,063 m
Black Butte		Montana	Lewis and Clark	Barr Creek	47°31′36″N 112°35′59″W	5,115 ft	1,559 m
Black Butte		Montana	Blaine	Bird Rapids	47°50′33″N 109°10′38″W	3,173 ft	967 m
Black Buttes		Montana	Pondera	Lone Man Coulee West	48°09′46″N 112°17′13″W	4,167 ft	1,270 m
Black Butte		Montana	Blaine	Lodge Pole NE	48°12′41″N 108°34′24″W	2,831 ft	863 m
Black Butte		Montana	Blaine	Scotty Butte	48°12′47″N 109°11′26″W	5,522 ft	1,683 m
Black Butte		Montana	Chouteau	Discovery Butte	48°14′12″N 110°32′40″W	3,038 ft	926 m
Black Butte		Montana	Hill	Herron Park	48°33′15″N 109°45′52″W	2,739 ft	835 m
Black Butte		Montana	Toole	Johannson Coulee	48°41′11″N 111°30′14″W	3,304 ft	1,007 m
Black Butte		Montana	Hill	McKinnsey Reservoir West	48°47′58″N 110°30′08″W	3,012 ft	918 m
Black Butte		Montana	Lincoln	Eureka South	48°51′53″N 115°07′30″W	4,032 ft	1,229 m
Black Jack Butte		Montana	Liberty	Bingham Lake	48°53′57″N 111°06′21″W	5,200 ft	1,600 m
Black Butte		Nevada	Clark	Green Monster Mine	35°52′56″N 115°43′15″W	3,320 ft	1,010 m
Black Butte		Nevada	Clark	Devils Throat	36°29′52″N 114°11′52″W	2,690 ft	820 m
Black Mountain		Nevada	Esmeralda	Gold Point SW	37°19′11″N 117°27′32″W	6,115 ft	1,864 m
Black Butte		Nevada	Esmeralda	McMahon Ridge	37°45′03″N 117°10′37″W	5,853 ft	1,784 m
Black Butte		Nevada	Nye	Yellow Cone	38°05′49″N 116°47′54″W	5,955 ft	1,815 m
Black Buttes		Nevada	Nye	Belmont East	38°36′28″N 116°50′31″W	7,264 ft	2,214 m
Red Hills		Nevada	Nye	Portuguese Mountain NW	38°39′44″N 115°55′31″W	6,417 ft	1,956 m
Black Butte		Nevada	White Pine	Willow Grove	39°01′47″N 115°20′49″W	7,533 ft	2,296 m
Black Butte		Nevada	Nye	Burnt Cabin Summit	39°01′49″N 117°46′31″W	7,516 ft	2,291 m
Black Butte		Nevada	Churchill	Hazen	39°34′46″N 119°03′26″W	4,685 ft	1,428 m
Black Butte		Nevada	Churchill	Dixie Valley SE	39°36′48″N 118°00′06″W	5,758 ft	1,755 m
Black Butte		Nevada	Washoe	Poodle Mountain	40°49′01″N 119°43′02″W	6,417 ft	1,956 m
Blue Mountain		Nevada	Humboldt	Pronto	40°59′11″N 118°05′07″W	7,142 ft	2,177 m
Black Butte		Nevada	Humboldt	Winnemucca Mountain	41°01′29″N 117°49′25″W	5,515 ft	1,681 m
Black Butte		Nevada	Elko	Black Butte	41°21′23″N 115°04′21″W	6,860 ft	2,090 m
Black Butte		Nevada	Humboldt	Bottle Creek Slough NW	41°25′22″N 118°14′33″W	4,383 ft	1,336 m
Black Buttes		Nevada	Humboldt	Yellow Hills East	41°26′43″N 119°16′50″W	6,437 ft	1,962 m
Black Butte		Nevada	Humboldt	Denio Summit	41°46′40″N 118°30′38″W	5,049 ft	1,539 m
Black Butte		New Mexico	Socorro	Black Butte	34°24′34″N 106°41′07″W	5,472 ft	1,668 m
Black Mesa		New Mexico	Valencia	South Garcia	34°53′38″N 107°05′27″W	5,430 ft	1,660 m
Black Butte		North Dakota	Hettinger	Stony Butte	46°31′12″N 102°33′44″W	2,890 ft	880 m
Black Butte		North Dakota	Slope	Black Butte	46°23′53″N 103°26′54″W	3,465 ft	1,056 m
Black Butte		North Dakota	Ward	Sawyer	48°05′59″N 101°01′25″W	1,716 ft	523 m
Black Top Butte		North Dakota	Billings	Roosevelt Creek East	47°14′11″N 103°34′14″W	2,441 ft	744 m
Black Butte		Oregon	Clatsop	Soapstone Lake	45°48′26″N 123°52′25″W	1,978 ft	603 m
Black Canyon Butte		Oregon	Umatilla	Duncan	45°34′08″N 118°17′21″W	4,449 ft	1,356 m
Black Butte		Oregon	Malheur	Stoney Corral	42°09′32″N 117°14′43″W	5,833 ft	1,778 m
Black Butte		Oregon	Klamath	Sandhill Crossing	42°37′06″N 120°57′07″W	7,067 ft	2,154 m
Black Butte		Oregon	Jackson	McConville Peak	42°37′12″N 123°06′20″W	3,629 ft	1,106 m
Black Butte		Oregon	Malheur	Little Grassy Mountain	42°45′56″N 117°15′42″W	4,728 ft	1,441 m
Black Butte		Oregon	Douglas	Taft Mountain	43°09′14″N 122°45′56″W	4,993 ft	1,522 m
Black Butte		Oregon	Harney	Malheur Lake East	43°16′18″N 118°42′42″W	4,377 ft	1,334 m
Black Butte		Oregon	Malheur	Quartz Mountain Basin	43°22′34″N 117°26′04″W	3,527 ft	1,075 m
Black Rock Butte		Oregon	Klamath	Odell Butte	43°28′55″N 121°48′45″W	4,872 ft	1,485 m
Black Butte		Oregon	Lane	Harness Mountain	43°34′10″N 123°03′29″W	2,690 ft	820 m
Black Butte		Oregon	Malheur	Selle Gap	43°43′44″N 118°12′33″W	5,502 ft	1,677 m
Donnelly Butte		Oregon	Harney	Donnelly Butte	43°51′48″N 119°32′22″W	6,024 ft	1,836 m
Black Butte		Oregon	Grant	Castle Rock	44°04′30″N 118°14′11″W	5,423 ft	1,653 m
Black Butte		Oregon	Jefferson	Black Butte	44°23′58″N 121°38′04″W	6,365 ft	1,940 m
Little Black Butte		Oregon	Grant	Wolfinger Butte	44°29′45″N 119°07′43″W	5,682 ft	1,732 m
Black Butte		Oregon	Grant	Belshaw Meadows	44°32′25″N 119°08′19″W	6,220 ft	1,900 m
Black Butte		Oregon	Wheeler	Lawson Mountain	44°33′31″N 120°16′28″W	5,023 ft	1,531 m
Black Butte		Oregon	Grant	Vinegar Hill	44°42′03″N 118°34′43″W	7,136 ft	2,175 m
Black Butte		Oregon	Grant	Crawfish Lake	44°57′35″N 118°19′28″W	7,027 ft	2,142 m
Black Butte		Oregon	Wheeler	Fossil North	45°00′41″N 120°10′39″W	4,016 ft	1,224 m
Black Butte		Oregon	Gilliam	Matney Flat	45°10′39″N 120°01′14″W	3,432 ft	1,046 m
Black Butte		South Dakota	Stanley	Crokett Mountains	44°39′06″N 100°58′18″W	1,893 ft	577 m
Black Horse Butte		South Dakota	Corson	Black Horse Butte	45°37′09″N 101°53′03″W	2,628 ft	801 m
Black Butte		Washington	Klickitat	White Pine Buttes	45°56′08″N 120°56′48″W	3,064 ft	934 m
Black Buttes		Washington	Whatcom	Mount Baker	48°46′09″N 121°51′10″W	7,979 ft	2,432 m
Black Butte		Washington	Grant	Stratford	47°24′30″N 119°20′28″W	1,555 ft	474 m
Black Butte		Washington	Whitman	La Crosse West	46°50′30″N 117°56′16″W	1,476 ft	450 m
Black Butte		Washington	Asotin	Black Butte	46°00′27″N 117°07′05″W	4,137 ft	1,261 m
Black Buttes		Wyoming	Sweetwater	Point of Rocks SE	41°33′18″N 108°48′07″W	7,972 ft	2,430 m
Black Rock		Wyoming	Sweetwater	Black Rock South	41°52′30″N 108°47′37″W	7,175 ft	2,187 m
Black Butte		Wyoming	Sublette	Dodge Butte	43°07′55″N 110°01′54″W	8,599 ft	2,621 m
Black Butte		Wyoming	Hot Springs	Thermopolis	43°38′36″N 108°09′01″W	5,433 ft	1,656 m
Black Butte		Wyoming	Campbell	Little Thunder Reservoir	43°39′11″N 105°24′54″W	5,089 ft	1,551 m
Little Black Butte		Wyoming	Campbell	South Butte	43°39′13″N 105°51′11″W	5,331 ft	1,625 m
Black Butte		Wyoming	Campbell	Persson Draw	43°56′11″N 105°44′55″W	5,226 ft	1,593 m
Black Buttes		Wyoming	Crook	Duling Hill	44°17′27″N 104°16′15″W	5,856 ft	1,785 m
Black Butte		Wyoming	Big Horn	Spanish Point	44°23′22″N 107°27′23″W	9,219 ft	2,810 m
Black Butte		Wyoming	Big Horn	Bear Creek Ranch	44°41′22″N 107°56′59″W	5,374 ft	1,638 m
Black Butte		Utah	Box Elder	Black Butte	41°51′25″N 113°09′18″W	5,194 ft	1,583 m
Black Mesa Butte		Utah	San Juan	Black Mesa Butte	37°31′00″N 109°36′24″W	6,014 ft	1,833 m
Black Butte		Utah	Garfield	Tropic Reservoir	37°33′47″N 112°20′58″W	9,550 ft	2,910 m
Black Butte		Utah	Box Elder	Tecoma	41°18′33″N 114°02′04″W	5,804 ft	1,769 m
Table Mountain		Utah	Box Elder	Peplin Flats	41°42′40″N 113°08′45″W	4,501 ft	1,372 m
