= West Peak =

There are 21 mountain peaks named West Peak in the United States according to the US Geological Survey Geographic Names Information System.

- West Peak Valdez–Cordova Census Area, Alaska, 61°09′38″N 146°12′51″W, el. 4,875 feet (1,486 m)
- West Peak Aleutians West Census Area, Alaska, 52°55′45″N 173°12′24″E
- West Peak Juneau, Alaska, 58°15′10″N 134°15′14″W, el. 3,255 feet (992 m)
- West Peak Nome Census Area, Alaska, 65°55′19″N 166°14′48″W, el. 2,290 feet (700 m)
- West Peak Graham County, Arizona, 32°44′14″N 110°02′18″W, el. 8,645 feet (2,635 m)
- West Peak Tuolumne County, California, 37°58′49″N 119°29′53″W, el. 10,522 feet (3,207 m)
- West Peak Marin County, California, 37°55′24″N 122°35′48″W, el. 2,546 feet (776 m)
- West Peak Eagle County, Colorado, 39°51′32″N 106°32′51″W, el. 11,053 feet (3,369 m)
- West Peak New Haven County, Connecticut, 41°33′44″N 072°50′37″W, el. 1,007 feet (307 m)
- West Peak Piscataquis County, Maine, 45°32′42″N 069°17′45″W, el. 3,176 feet (968 m)
- West Peak Somerset County, Maine, 45°08′48″N 070°17′18″W, el. 4,131 feet (1,259 m)
- West Peak Piscataquis County, Maine, 45°55′29″N 069°01′59″W, el. 2,500 feet (760 m)
- West Peak Oxford County, Maine, 44°36′06″N 070°54′08″W, el. 3,665 feet (1,117 m)
- West Peak Fergus County, Montana, 46°46′47″N 109°32′11″W, el. 8,186 feet (2,495 m)
- West Peak Madison County, Montana, 45°44′01″N 112°29′03″W, el. 9,659 feet (2,944 m)
- West Peak Coos County, New Hampshire, 44°45′18″N 071°29′48″W, el. 3,520 feet (1,070 m)
- West Peak Grafton County, New Hampshire, 44°00′24″N 071°32′50″W, el. 4,094 feet (1,248 m)
- West Peak Elko County, Nevada, 40°54′19″N 115°38′30″W, el. 6,608 feet (2,014 m)
- West Peak Jefferson County, Washington, 47°48′04″N 123°42′40″W, el. 7,782 feet (2,372 m)
- West Peak Jefferson County, Washington, 47°43′22″N 123°20′56″W, el. 7,116 feet (2,169 m)
- West Peak Kittitas County, Washington, 47°19′12″N 121°10′51″W, el. 5,535 feet (1,687 m)
