= Echo Peak (Montana) =

Mountain in the state of Montana

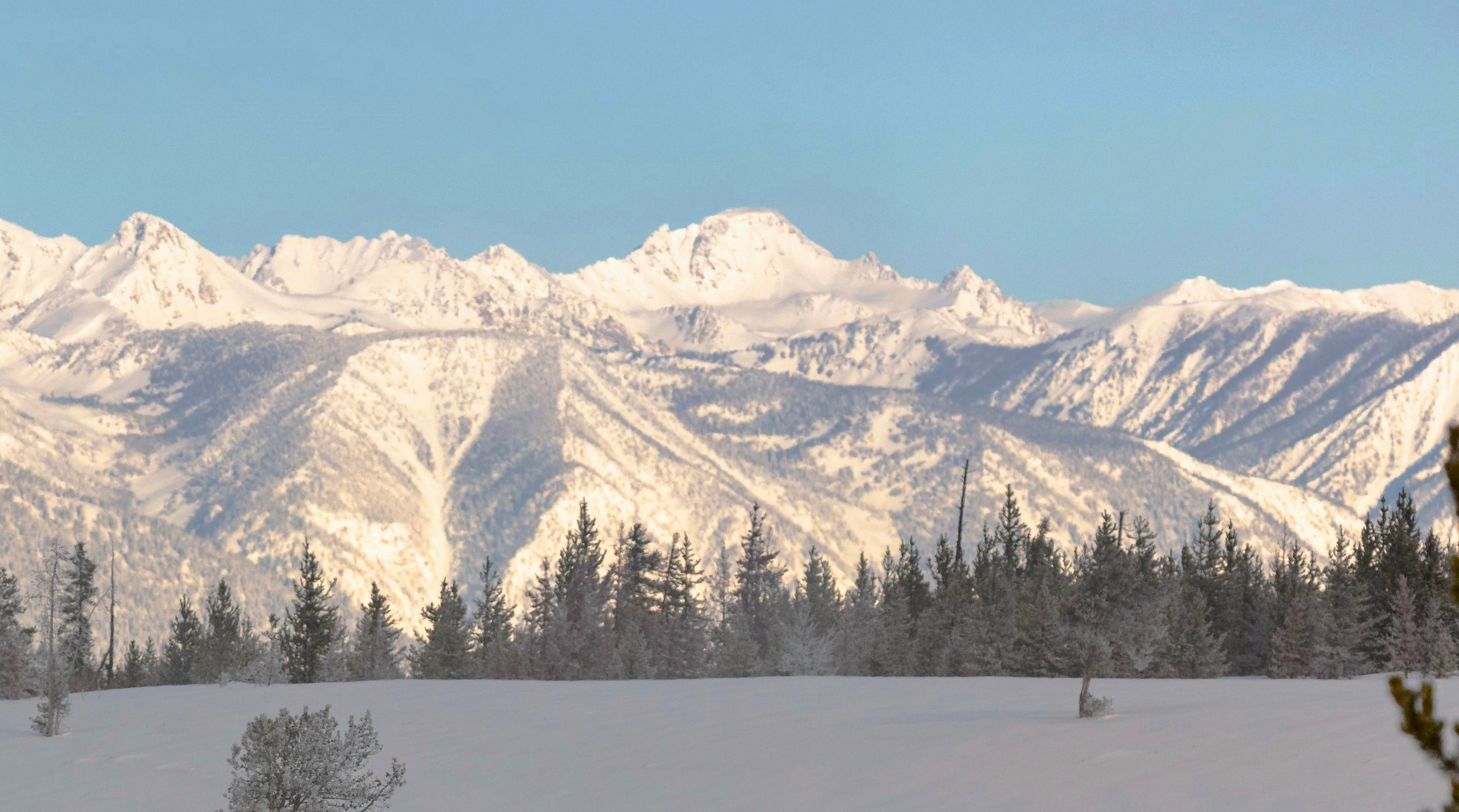
- Southeast aspect centered on skyline

Highest point
- Elevation: 11,225 ft (3,421 m)
- Prominence: 860 ft (260 m)
- Coordinates: 44°56′32″N 111°27′46″W

Geography
- Location within Montana Location within the United States
- Location: Madison County, Montana, U.S.
- Parent range: Madison Range
- Topo map(s): USGS Hilgard Peak, MT

Climbing
- Easiest route: Scramble

Echo Peak (11,225–11,265 feet (3,421–3,434 m)) is one of the taller mountains in the Madison Range in the U.S. state of Montana. The summit is located in Lee Metcalf Wilderness within Gallatin and Beaverhead-Deerlodge National Forests. Echo Peak is less than 2 mi (3.2 km) north of Hilgard Peak.

== Climate ==
Climate data for Echo Peak (MT) 44.9423 N, 111.4665 W, Elevation: 10,663 ft (3,250 m) (1991–2020 normals)
Month	Jan	Feb	Mar	Apr	May	Jun	Jul	Aug	Sep	Oct	Nov	Dec	Year
Mean daily maximum °F (°C)	21.4 (−5.9)	20.9 (−6.2)	25.7 (−3.5)	31.9 (−0.1)	41.3 (5.2)	50.6 (10.3)	61.8 (16.6)	61.3 (16.3)	51.7 (10.9)	38.0 (3.3)	26.4 (−3.1)	20.4 (−6.4)	37.6 (3.1)
Daily mean °F (°C)	13.0 (−10.6)	11.5 (−11.4)	15.7 (−9.1)	20.7 (−6.3)	29.5 (−1.4)	38.3 (3.5)	48.0 (8.9)	47.6 (8.7)	39.0 (3.9)	27.3 (−2.6)	18.0 (−7.8)	12.3 (−10.9)	26.7 (−2.9)
Mean daily minimum °F (°C)	4.6 (−15.2)	2.2 (−16.6)	5.7 (−14.6)	9.5 (−12.5)	17.7 (−7.9)	26.0 (−3.3)	34.3 (1.3)	33.9 (1.1)	26.2 (−3.2)	16.6 (−8.6)	9.6 (−12.4)	4.2 (−15.4)	15.9 (−8.9)
Average precipitation inches (mm)	6.01 (153)	5.32 (135)	5.55 (141)	5.60 (142)	4.61 (117)	3.97 (101)	2.44 (62)	2.47 (63)	2.83 (72)	4.51 (115)	5.16 (131)	6.09 (155)	54.56 (1,387)
Source: PRISM Climate Group
