= Mesquite Valley =

Valley in California and Nevada, United States

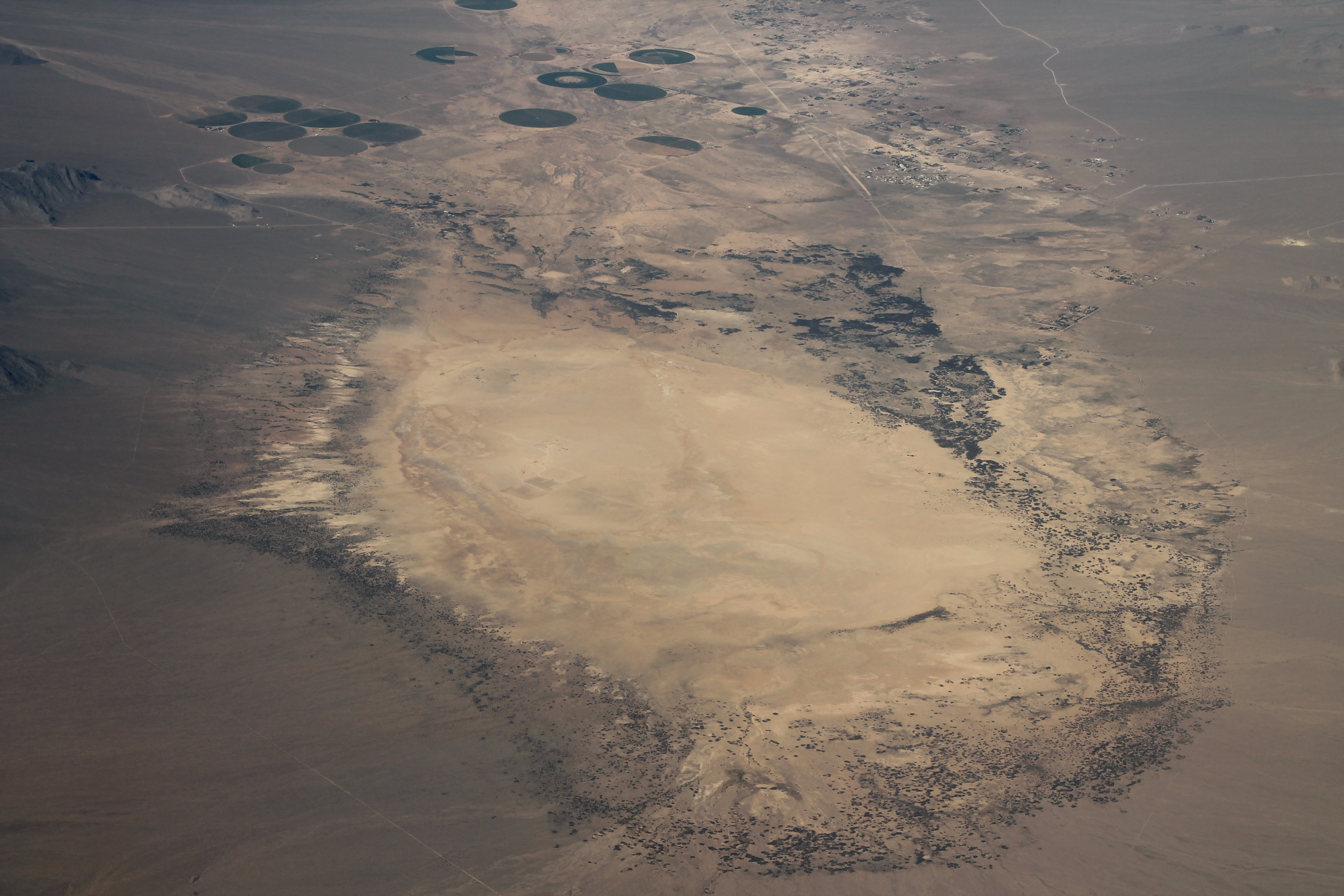
Dry lake bed in the Mesquite Valley near Sandy Valley, Nevada

Mesquite Valley is a valley in Clark County, Nevada and Inyo County and San Bernardino County, California. Mesquite is an endorheic basin with Mesquite Lake at is lowest point at an elevation of 2,536 feet/773 meters. This valley trends northwest and southeast with a head at 35°40′07″N 115°29′09″W to the southeast near State Line Pass and another head at 35°53′50″N 115°46′55″W at the southwestern end of Pahrump Valley, at an elevation of 2,808 feet/856 meters, between the Kingston Range and Black Butte to the northwest. It is bounded on the northeast by the Spring Mountains, by the Mesquite Mountains to the southwest and the Clark Mountains to the southeast.
