= Table Mountain (Madison County, Montana) =

Mountain in Montana, United States

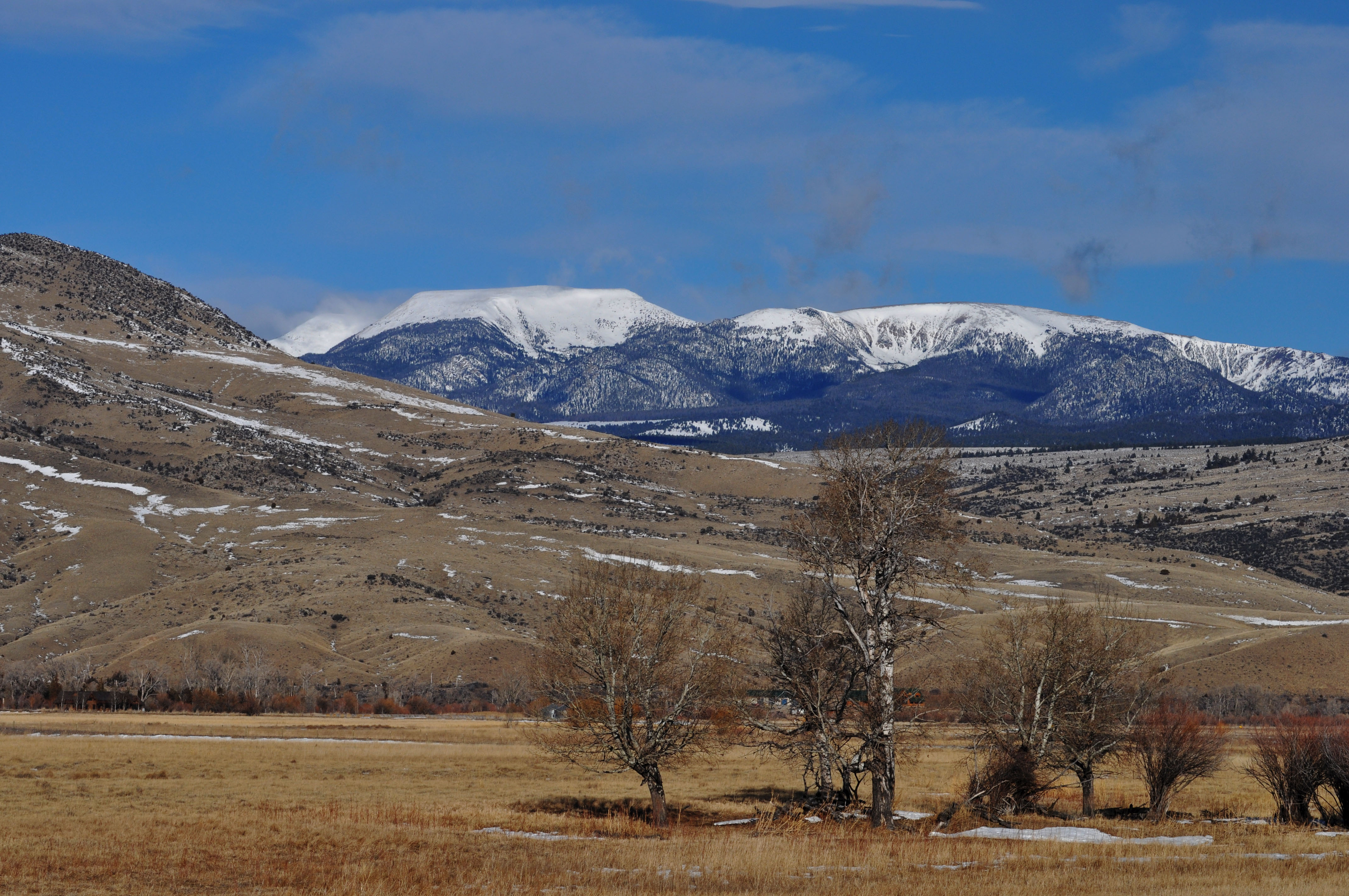
- Table Mountain, Hell's Canyon Face (East)

Highest point
- Elevation: 10,213 feet (3,113 m)
- Prominence: 4,422 feet (1,348 m)
- Isolation: 19.3 miles (31.1 km)
- Coordinates: 45°44′32″N 112°27′43″W

Geography
- Location within Montana
- Location: Madison County, Montana
- Parent range: Highland Mountains

Table Mountain, el. 10,213 feet (3,113 m) is the highest peak in the Highland Mountains in Madison County, Montana. It is located in Beaverhead-Deerlodge National Forest. Headwaters of Moose Creek, Fish Creek and Hell's Canyon Creek, all significant tributaries of the Jefferson River flow off the face of the mountain.

== See also ==
- Mountains of Madison County, Montana
