= Helmet Peak =

Helmet Peak may refer to:

- Helmet Peak (Antarctica) (Livingston Island)
- Helmet Peak (British Columbia)

== See also ==
- The Helmet (mountain), a mountain in Montana
