= The Helmet (mountain) =

Mountain in the U.S. state of Montana

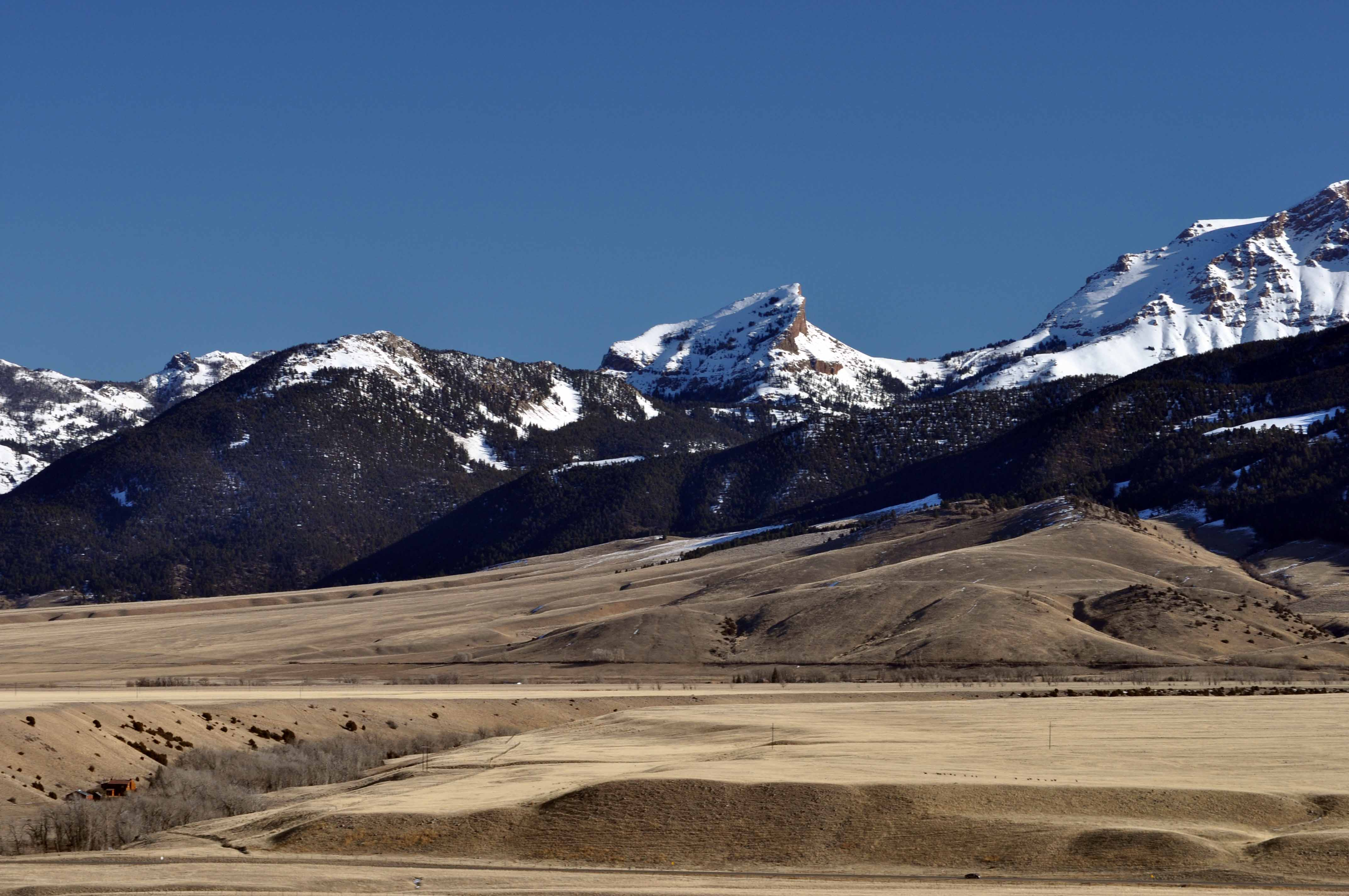
- The Helmet, just north of Sphinx Mountain

Highest point
- Elevation: 9,449 feet (2,880 m)
- Coordinates: 45°09′56″N 111°30′02″W

Geography
- Location within Montana

The Helmet is a mountain peak in the Madison Range in Madison County, Montana, in the United States. The peak is located in the Beaverhead National Forest and Taylor Hilgard parcel of the Lee Metcalf Wilderness area. Its prominence, isolation and proximity to Sphinx Mountain makes it easy to distinguish from Ennis in the Madison River valley.

The name is descriptive, as the peak is said to look like a helmet.

== Notes ==
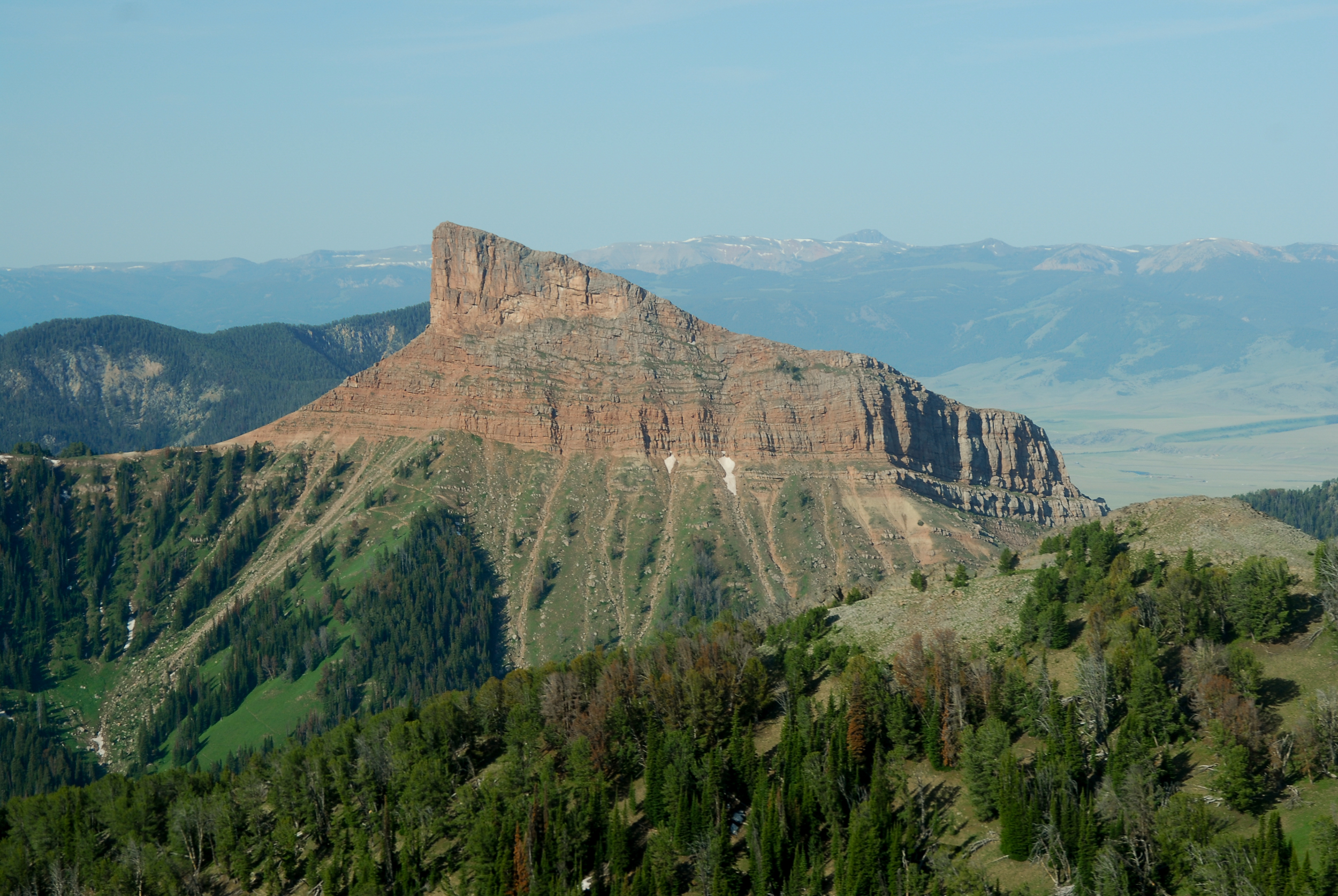
The Helmet
