= Gravelly Range =

Mountain range in the state of Montana

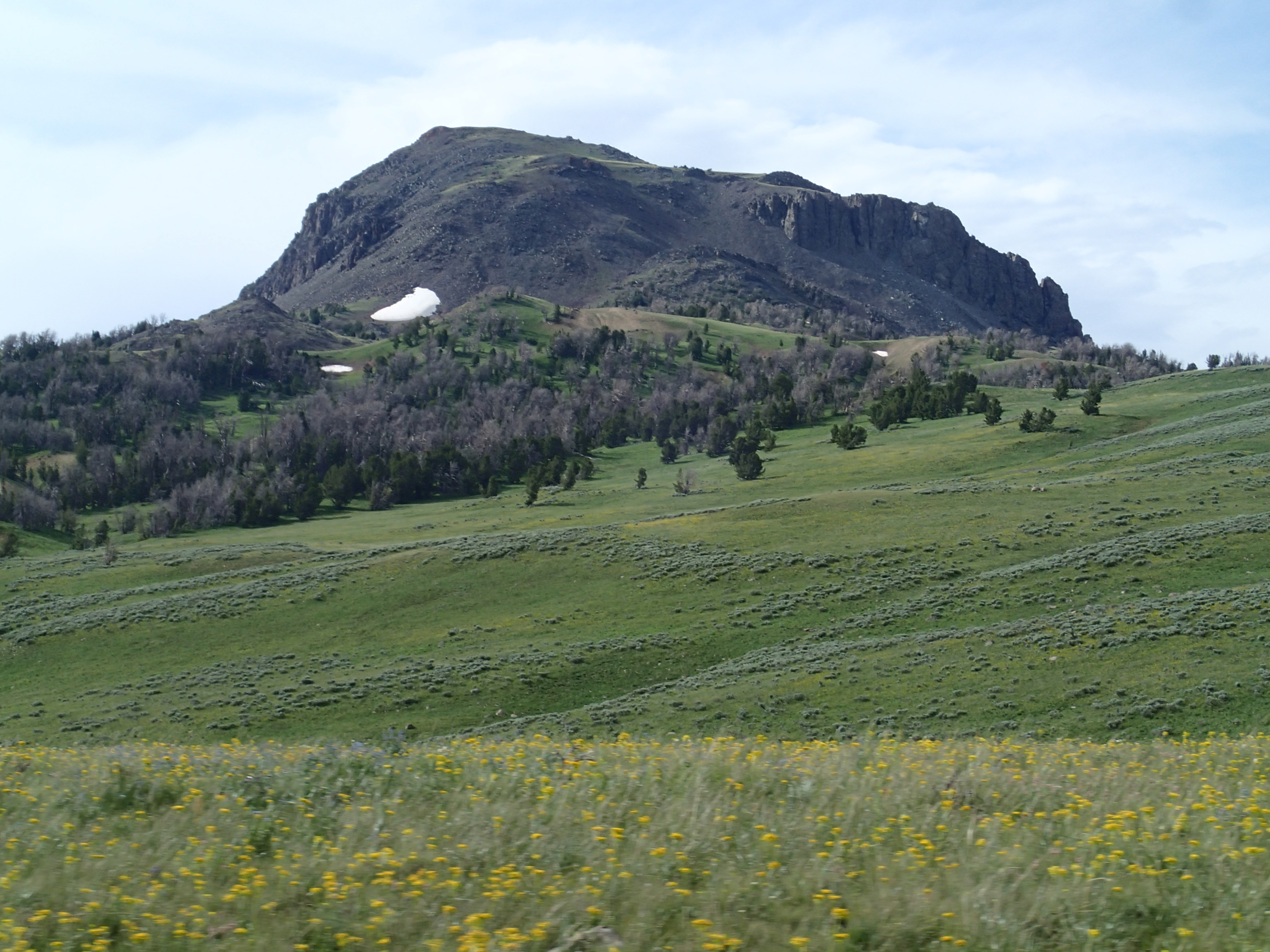
- Black Butte Gravelly Range July 2013

Highest point
- Peak: Black Butte
- Elevation: 10,542 ft (3,213 m)
- Coordinates: 45°05′21″N 111°51′25″W

Geography
- Location within Montana
- Country: United States
- State: Montana

The Gravelly Range, highest peak Black Butte, el. 10,542 feet (3,213 m), is a mountain range southwest of Cameron, Montana in Madison County, Montana.

About 310,000 acres total are roadless, separated by roads into nine units, the largest of which is 66,000 acres in size. Nearly all the range is part of the Beaverhead-Deerlodge National Forest. In the northern part of the range is the Bureau of Land Management's Axolotl Lakes Wilderness Study Area, 7,804 acres in size, which is part of a larger roadless area of 47,000 acres. The Axolotl Lakes WSA is home to a unique form of indigenous tiger salamander. This part of the Gravellies is characterized by open foothills rising to mixed coniferous forest interspersed with meadows. Some of the highest-elevation pronghorn habitat in Montana is found here.

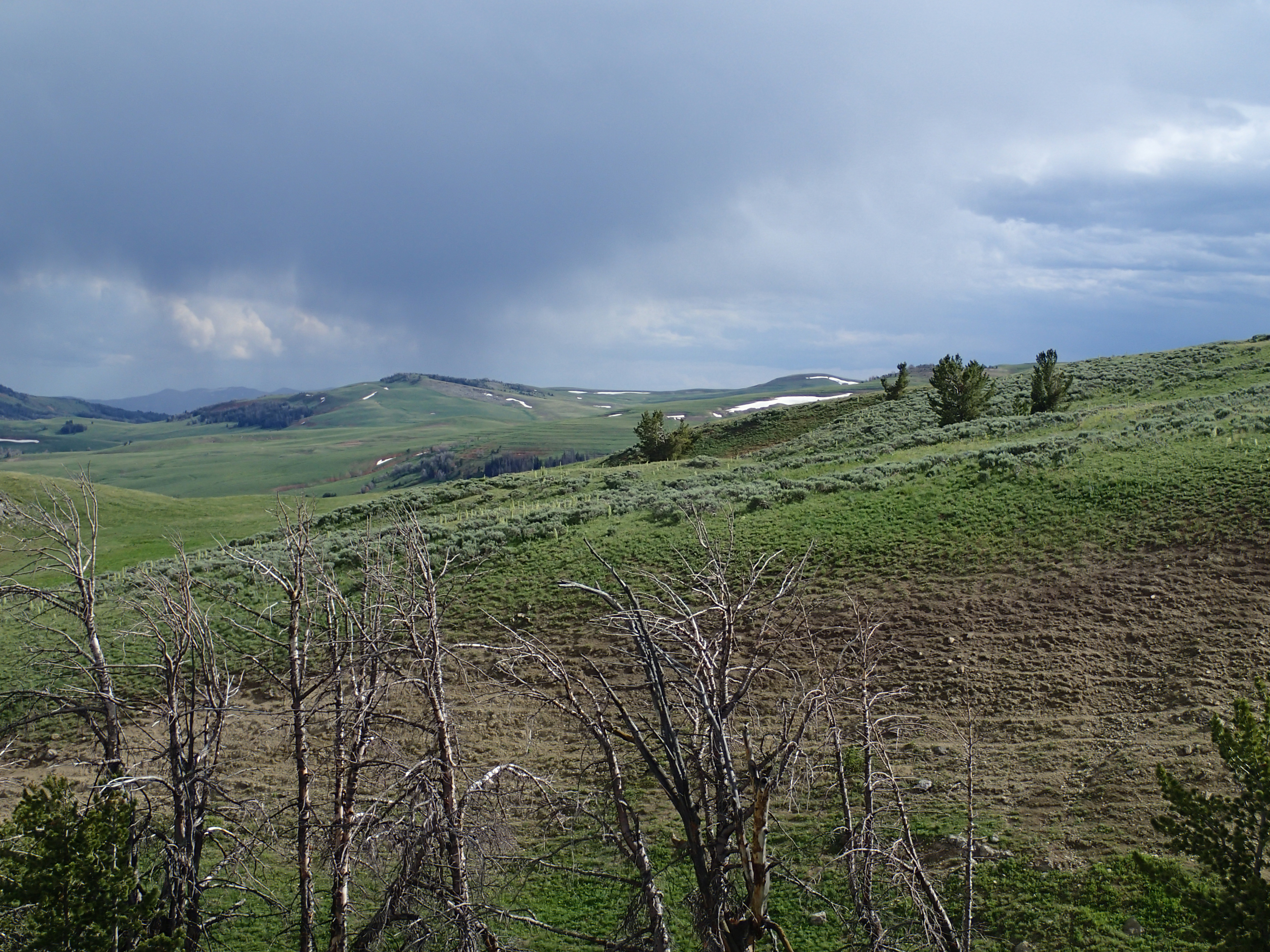
Gravelly Range July 2013

On the eastern slope of the Gravellies, Cave Mountain is home to unique undisturbed grasslands and caves that attract spelunkers. The most rugged part of the range is a 52,870-acre roadless area centered on 10,281' Big Horn Mountain, with deep canyons, cliffs, steep benches, and undulating basins.

The largest roadless area in the Gravellies features rolling basins cut by rocky canyons, old Native American campsites along the Gravelly Divide, and westslope cutthroat trout in the remote canyons of the Elk River.

The southeastern part of the range, near the Continental Divide, features a chain of lakes that provide homes to nesting trumpeter swans and bald eagles. Grizzly bears have recently been confirmed to be living in the Gravellies.

== Climate ==
Clover Meadows is a camping area in the Gravelly Range, roughly 9 miles (14.5 km) north of Black Butte (Madison County, Montana). Clover Meadows has a subalpine climate (Köppen Dfc).

Climate data for Clover Meadow, Montana, 1991–2020 normals: 8600ft (2621m)
Month	Jan	Feb	Mar	Apr	May	Jun	Jul	Aug	Sep	Oct	Nov	Dec	Year
Mean daily maximum °F (°C)	25.4 (−3.7)	27.6 (−2.4)	35.5 (1.9)	41.4 (5.2)	50.0 (10.0)	57.0 (13.9)	67.5 (19.7)	66.7 (19.3)	57.1 (13.9)	42.9 (6.1)	30.7 (−0.7)	23.6 (−4.7)	43.8 (6.5)
Daily mean °F (°C)	18.6 (−7.4)	19.3 (−7.1)	25.6 (−3.6)	30.7 (−0.7)	39.5 (4.2)	46.3 (7.9)	55.5 (13.1)	54.8 (12.7)	46.7 (8.2)	34.4 (1.3)	23.7 (−4.6)	17.2 (−8.2)	34.4 (1.3)
Mean daily minimum °F (°C)	11.8 (−11.2)	10.9 (−11.7)	15.8 (−9.0)	20.1 (−6.6)	29.0 (−1.7)	35.6 (2.0)	43.7 (6.5)	43.0 (6.1)	36.2 (2.3)	25.8 (−3.4)	16.6 (−8.6)	10.7 (−11.8)	24.9 (−3.9)
Average precipitation inches (mm)	2.46 (62)	2.32 (59)	2.93 (74)	4.19 (106)	3.64 (92)	3.30 (84)	1.51 (38)	1.68 (43)	2.18 (55)	2.84 (72)	2.77 (70)	2.56 (65)	32.38 (820)
Source 1: XMACIS2
Source 2: NOAA (Precipitation)

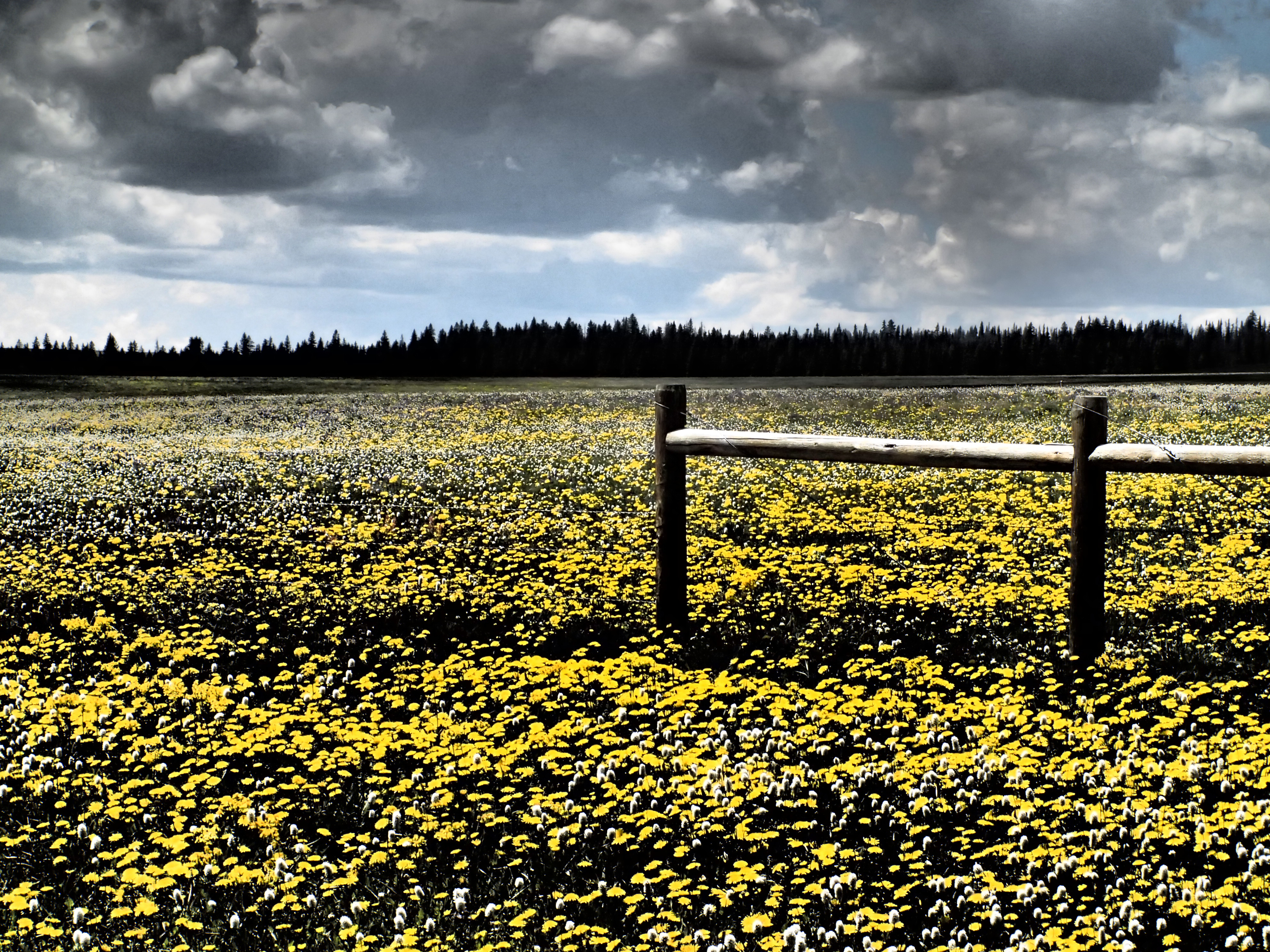
Wildflowers July 2013

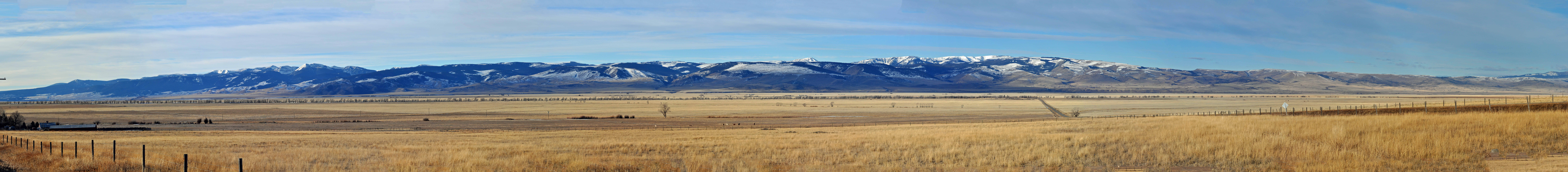
East face Gravelly Range

== See also ==
- List of mountain ranges in Montana
