= Koch Peak =

Mountain in the state of Montana

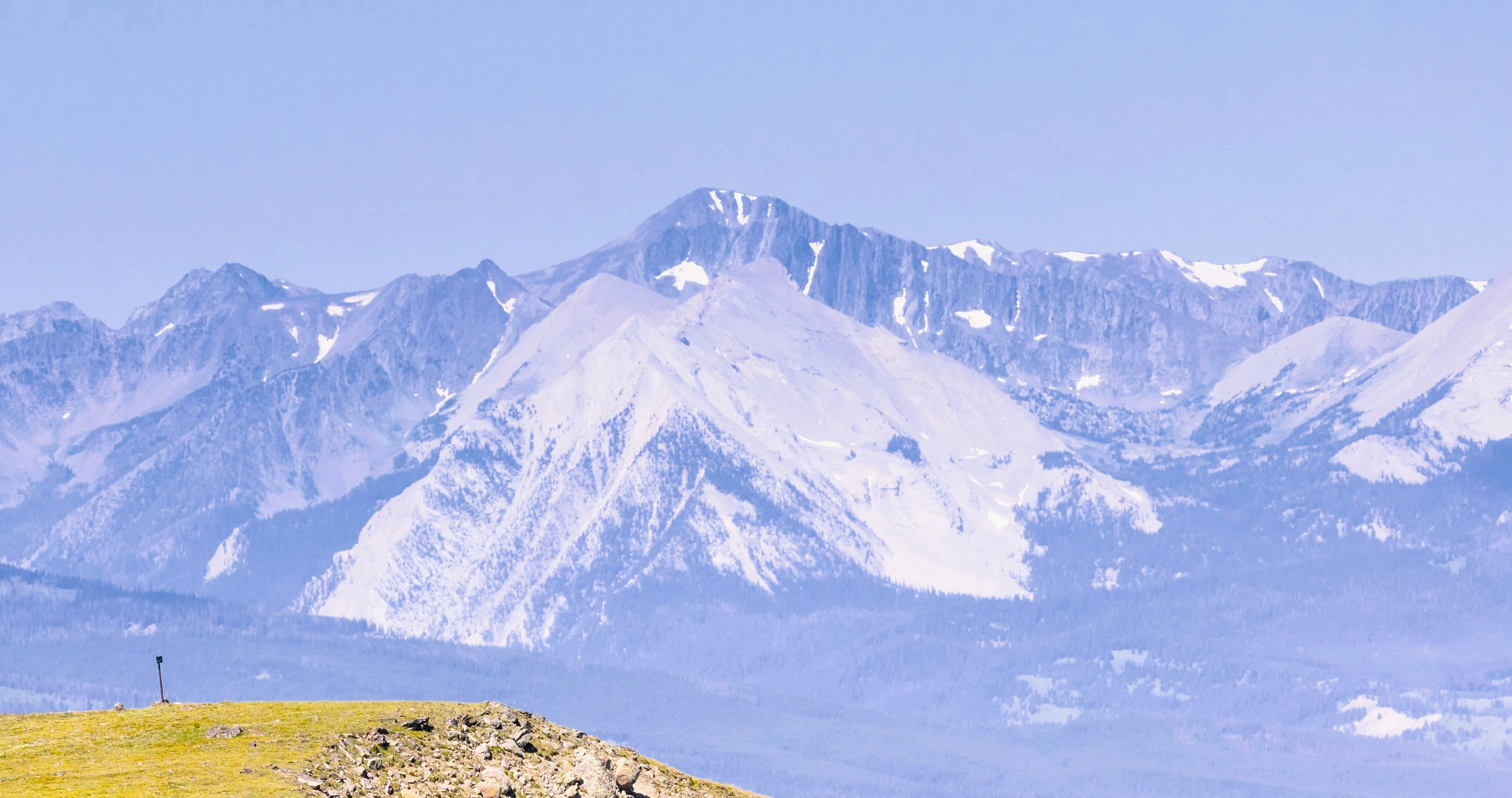
- East aspect, centered on skyline

Highest point
- Elevation: 11,298 ft (3,444 m)
- Prominence: 1,173 ft (358 m)
- Coordinates: 45°02′13″N 111°27′36″W

Geography
- Location within Montana Location within the United States
- Location: Madison County, Montana, U.S.
- Parent range: Madison Range
- Topo map(s): USGS Koch Peak, MT

Climbing
- Easiest route: Scramble

Koch Peak (11,298 feet (3,444 m)) is one of the taller mountains in the Madison Range in the U.S. state of Montana. The summit is located in Lee Metcalf Wilderness within Gallatin and Beaverhead-Deerlodge National Forests. Koch Peak is tallest in a group of summits collectively called the Taylor Peaks.
