= Black Butte (Clark County, Nevada) =

Mountain in Nevada, United States

Coordinates: 35°52′56″N 115°43′15″W

Highest point
- Elevation: 3,320 feet

Geography
- Location: Clark County, Nevada
- Country: United States

Black Butte is the summit of a small range of hills on the northwest edge of Mesquite Valley and the southern end of the Pahrump Valley in Clark County, Nevada. It has an elevation of 3,320 feet / 1,010 meters.
