= Highland Mountains =

- Location within Montana

Highest point
- Peak: Table Mountain
- Elevation: 10,223 ft (3,116 m)
- Coordinates: 45°43′34″N 112°28′44″W

Geography
- Country: United States
- State: Montana

The Highland Mountains, highest point Table Mountain, el. 10,223 feet (3,116 m), are a small mountain range southwest of Whitehall, Montana in Silver Bow and Madison County, Montana.

The Continental Divide winds through the range. A 21,000-acre roadless area encompasses the core of the range, which includes Red Mountain, also over 10,000'. Nutritious alpine forage in the Highlands gives area bighorn sheep the fastest horn growth of any herd in Montana. The green-tinted waters of Emerald Lake provide a nice contrast to the red rock of Red Mountain. A smaller roadless area of about 10,000 acres in the Basin Creek drainage protects Butte's municipal watershed. Lodgepole pine and Douglas-fir are common tree species.

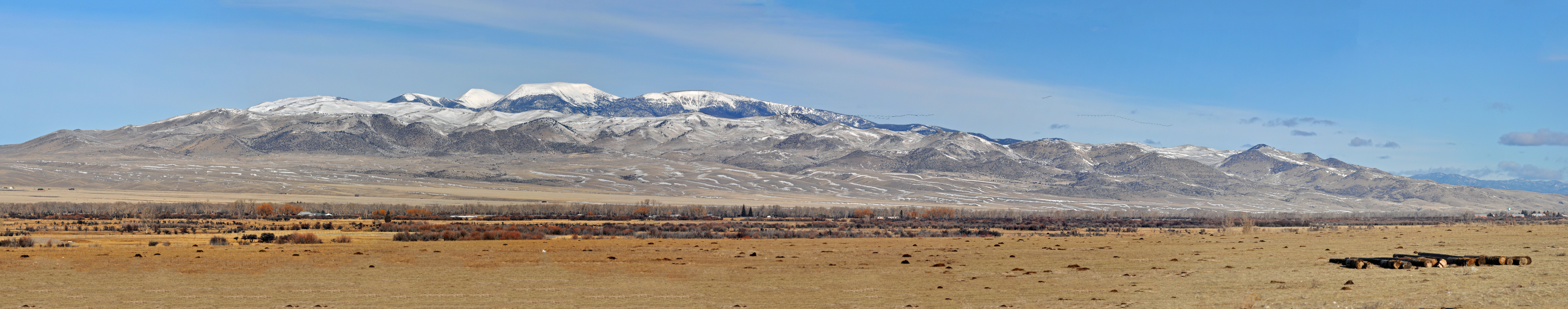
Highland Mountains from Twin Bridges, Montana, January 2015

== See also ==
- List of mountain ranges in Montana
