= Madison Range =

Mountain range located in the Rocky Mountains of Montana and Idaho, U.S.

Madison
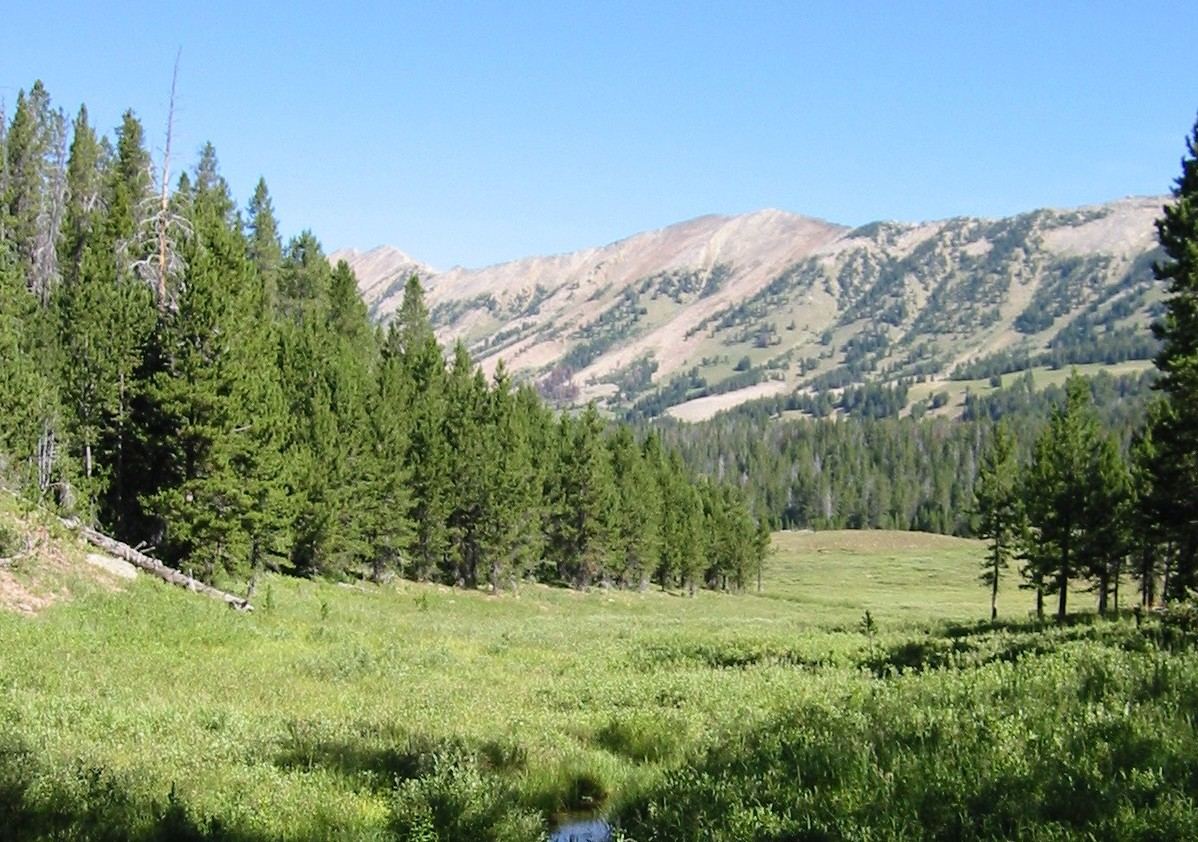
- Madison Range near Hebgen Lake

Highest point
- Peak: Hilgard Peak
- Elevation: 11,316 ft (3,449 m)
- Coordinates: 44°55′00″N 111°27′35″W

Dimensions
- Length: 80 mi (130 km)
- Width: 25 mi (40 km)

Geography
- Location within the United States
- Country: United States
- Region: Montana / Idaho
- Parent range: Rocky Mountains

The Madison Range is a mountain range located in the Rocky Mountains of Montana and Idaho, in the United States. The range was named for President James Madison, then the United States Secretary of State, by Meriwether Lewis as the Lewis and Clark Expedition travelled through Montana in 1805. The range extends 80 miles (130 km) from West Yellowstone, Montana to Bozeman, Montana and is flanked by the Madison River on the west and the Gallatin River to the east. The highest point in the range is Hilgard Peak at 11,316 ft (3,449 m), a remote peak that was not climbed until 1948.

The Madison Range is the westernmost section of the Greater Yellowstone Ecosystem. Most of the range lies within Beaverhead–Deerlodge and Gallatin National Forests, with a small portion of the range later being protected with the creation of the Lee Metcalf Wilderness. The region has grizzly and black bears and at least one pack of wolves. Most other larger mammal species native to the region continue to exist in the range.

Quake Lake lies not far to the south of Hilgard Peak. The lake was created by a landslide which dammed the Madison River at the time of the M7.5 1959 Hebgen Lake earthquake.

== Climate ==
Yellow Mule is a Remote Automated Weather Station on Buck Ridge, located 7.5 miles (12.1 km) north of Big Sky Meadow Village. Yellow Mule has a subalpine climate (Köppen Dfc).

Climate data for Yellow Mule (RAWS), Montana, elevation 9,200 feet or 2,800 meters, 2002–2020 normals
Month	Jan	Feb	Mar	Apr	May	Jun	Jul	Aug	Sep	Oct	Nov	Dec	Year
Mean daily maximum °F (°C)	22.1 (−5.5)	21.3 (−5.9)	28.1 (−2.2)	34.8 (1.6)	44.6 (7.0)	54.3 (12.4)	65.2 (18.4)	62.7 (17.1)	53.6 (12.0)	39.0 (3.9)	27.5 (−2.5)	19.7 (−6.8)	39.4 (4.1)
Daily mean °F (°C)	16.4 (−8.7)	14.9 (−9.5)	21.1 (−6.1)	26.6 (−3.0)	36.5 (2.5)	46.1 (7.8)	56.1 (13.4)	53.6 (12.0)	45.5 (7.5)	32.0 (0.0)	21.5 (−5.8)	14.0 (−10.0)	32.0 (0.0)
Mean daily minimum °F (°C)	10.6 (−11.9)	8.6 (−13.0)	14.1 (−9.9)	18.4 (−7.6)	28.5 (−1.9)	37.8 (3.2)	46.9 (8.3)	44.5 (6.9)	37.3 (2.9)	25.0 (−3.9)	15.5 (−9.2)	8.2 (−13.2)	24.6 (−4.1)
Source: XMACIS2

== Gallery ==
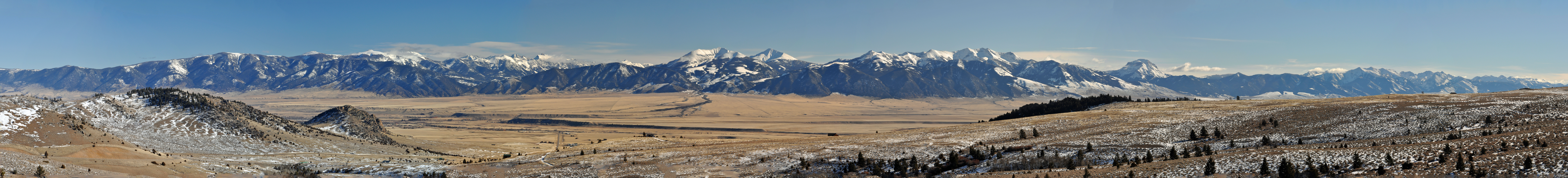
Western face of Madison Range from just west of Ennis, Montana
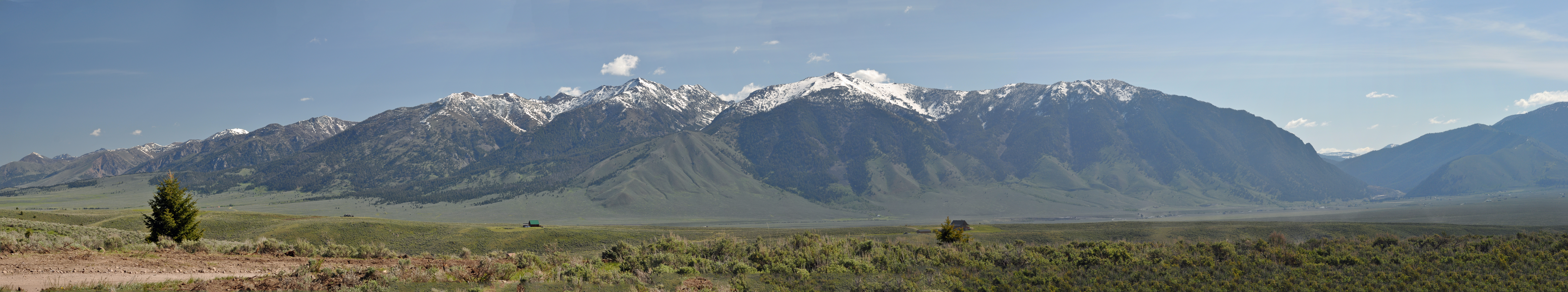
Southwest Face of Madison Range from across Madison Valley on the Cliff-Wade Lakes road, May 29, 2017

== See also ==
- List of mountain ranges in Montana
