= Lee Metcalf Wilderness =

Wilderness area in Montana, United States

- IUCN category Ib (wilderness area)
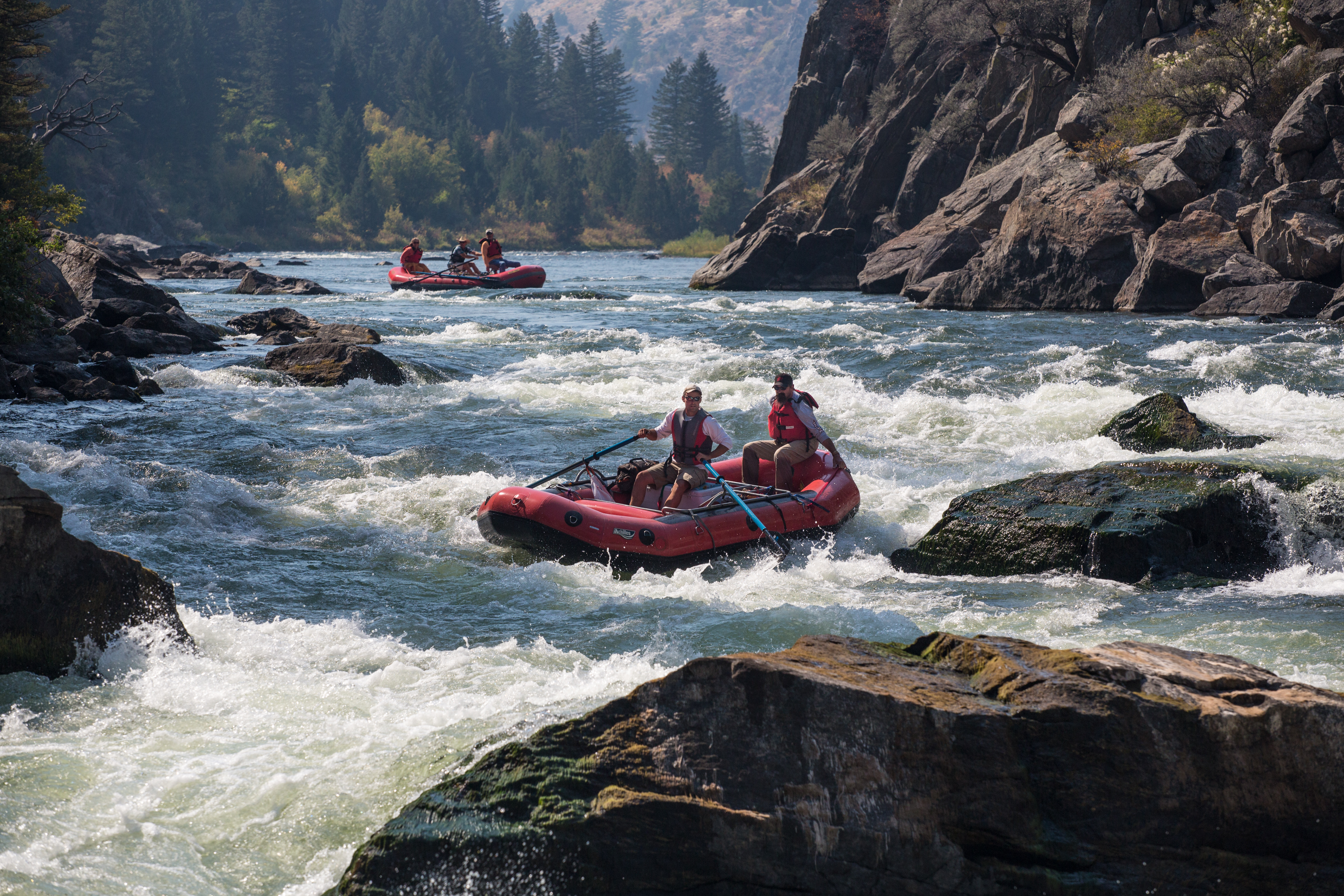

- Location within the United States Location within Montana
- Location: Madison / Gallatin counties, Montana, USA
- Nearest city: Bozeman, MT
- Coordinates: 45°08′N 111°27′W
- Area: 254,288 acres (1,029.07 km^{2})
- Established: 1983
- Governing body: U.S. Forest Service; U.S. Bureau of Land Management

The Lee Metcalf Wilderness is located in the northern Rocky Mountains in the U.S. state of Montana. Created by an act of Congress in 1983, this rugged alpine wilderness is divided into four separated parcels typified by complex mountain topography: Bear Trap Canyon unit, Spanish Peaks unit, Taylor-Hilgard unit, and Monument Mountains unit. The Bear Trap Canyon unit is managed by the Bureau of Land Management (an agency within the Department of the Interior) and comprises a region of canyonlands adjacent to the Madison River. The other three sections of the wilderness are jointly managed by Beaverhead-Deerlodge and Gallatin National Forests, both of which are a part of the Department of Agriculture. The wilderness was named after the late Montana congressman Lee Metcalf.

The portion of the wilderness within Gallatin National Forest is also within the Greater Yellowstone Ecosystem and borders Yellowstone National Park. U.S. wilderness areas prohibit motorized and mechanized vehicles, including bicycles. Although camping and fishing are allowed with proper permit, there are no roads or buildings, and neither any logging or mining, in compliance with the 1964 Wilderness Act. As such, the Metcalf Wilderness serves as a critical wildlife refuge for many threatened and endangered species of North America and is home to the highest population density of grizzly bear in the contiguous United States. Many other large North American fauna also inhabit this undisturbed alpine ecosystem, such as moose, elk, black bear, mountain goat, bighorn sheep, wolverines, cougars, Canadian lynx, and wolves, as well as bald eagles, osprey, pelicans, and trumpeter swans.

== Climate ==
The Beaver Creek SNOTEL weather station is located at the southern end of Lee Metcalf Wilderness, in the valley east of Echo Peak (Montana). Beaver Creek has a subalpine climate (Köppen Dfc).

Climate data for Beaver Creek, Montana, 1991–2020 normals, 1985-2020 extremes: 7850ft (2393m)
Month	Jan	Feb	Mar	Apr	May	Jun	Jul	Aug	Sep	Oct	Nov	Dec	Year
Record high °F (°C)	49 (9)	46 (8)	58 (14)	67 (19)	76 (24)	82 (28)	86 (30)	85 (29)	86 (30)	73 (23)	56 (13)	46 (8)	86 (30)
Mean maximum °F (°C)	36.2 (2.3)	40.0 (4.4)	49.4 (9.7)	57.2 (14.0)	65.6 (18.7)	73.4 (23.0)	79.3 (26.3)	78.4 (25.8)	74.2 (23.4)	62.6 (17.0)	46.5 (8.1)	35.8 (2.1)	80.3 (26.8)
Mean daily maximum °F (°C)	24.8 (−4.0)	28.4 (−2.0)	35.9 (2.2)	42.4 (5.8)	51.3 (10.7)	59.8 (15.4)	69.8 (21.0)	69.0 (20.6)	59.8 (15.4)	45.6 (7.6)	31.7 (−0.2)	23.7 (−4.6)	45.2 (7.3)
Daily mean °F (°C)	15.6 (−9.1)	17.5 (−8.1)	24.4 (−4.2)	31.2 (−0.4)	40.1 (4.5)	47.4 (8.6)	55.4 (13.0)	54.3 (12.4)	46.7 (8.2)	35.1 (1.7)	22.3 (−5.4)	14.9 (−9.5)	33.7 (1.0)
Mean daily minimum °F (°C)	6.4 (−14.2)	6.7 (−14.1)	12.8 (−10.7)	20.0 (−6.7)	28.9 (−1.7)	35.1 (1.7)	41.0 (5.0)	39.6 (4.2)	33.5 (0.8)	24.5 (−4.2)	12.9 (−10.6)	6.0 (−14.4)	22.3 (−5.4)
Mean minimum °F (°C)	−13.8 (−25.4)	−14.5 (−25.8)	−6.7 (−21.5)	3.4 (−15.9)	15.6 (−9.1)	27.5 (−2.5)	33.5 (0.8)	31.3 (−0.4)	23.7 (−4.6)	7.6 (−13.6)	−7.8 (−22.1)	−15.3 (−26.3)	−21.6 (−29.8)
Record low °F (°C)	−26 (−32)	−38 (−39)	−19 (−28)	−13 (−25)	4 (−16)	19 (−7)	26 (−3)	22 (−6)	4 (−16)	−15 (−26)	−23 (−31)	−34 (−37)	−38 (−39)
Average precipitation inches (mm)	3.66 (93)	3.24 (82)	3.39 (86)	3.27 (83)	3.29 (84)	3.01 (76)	1.76 (45)	1.66 (42)	1.89 (48)	2.84 (72)	3.21 (82)	3.97 (101)	35.19 (894)
Source 1: XMACIS2
Source 2: NOAA (Precipitation)
