= Beaverhead–Deerlodge National Forest =

National Forests in Montana, United States

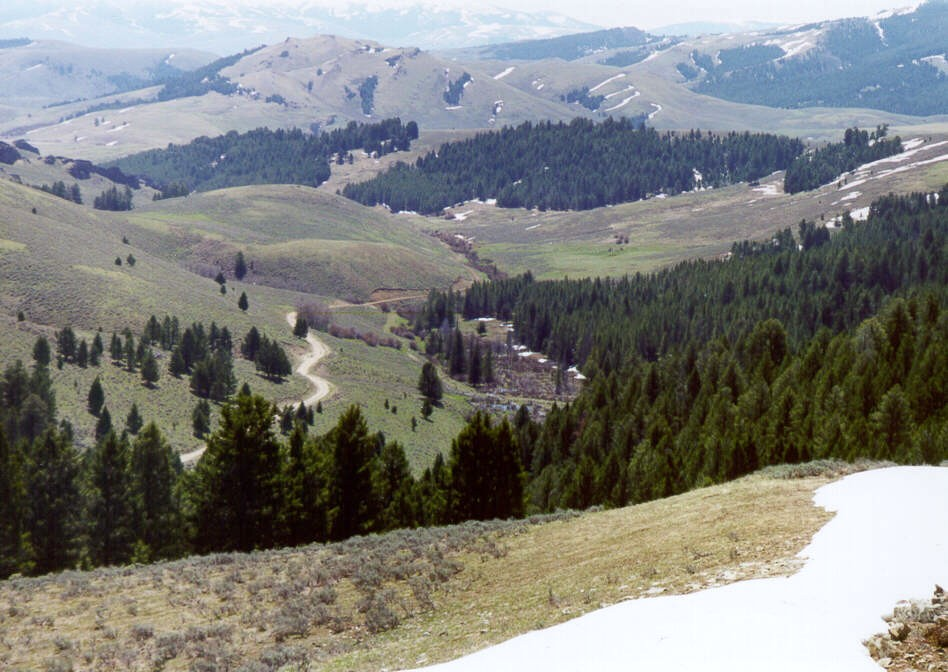
- Lemhi Pass in the Beaverhead-Deerlodge National Forest

- Location within the United States
- Location: Montana, USA
- Nearest city: Butte, MT
- Coordinates: 46°08′N 112°50′W
- Area: 3,357,826 acres (13,588.64 km^{2})
- Established: 1905
- Governing body: U.S. Forest Service
- Website: Beaverhead-Deerlodge National Forest

Interactive map of Beaverhead–Deerlodge National Forest

The Beaverhead–Deerlodge National Forest is the largest of the National Forests in Montana, United States. Covering 3.36 million acres (13,600 km^{2}), the forest is broken into nine separate sections and stretches across eight counties in the southwestern area of the state. President Theodore Roosevelt named the two forests in 1908 and they were merged in 1996. Forest headquarters are located in Dillon, Montana. In Roosevelt's original legislation, the Deerlodge National Forest was called the Big Hole Forest Reserve. He created this reserve because the Anaconda Copper Mining Company, based in Butte, Montana, had begun to clearcut the upper Big Hole River watershed. The subsequent erosion, exacerbated by smoke pollution from the Anaconda smelter, was devastating the region. Ranchers and conservationists alike complained to Roosevelt, who made several trips to the area. (Munday 2001)

The greatest part of the Anaconda-Pintler Wilderness is located in the larger Beaverhead National Forest portion of 2,130,671 acres (8,622.52 km^{2}), which is 64% of the total area of the forest. The rest of this wilderness extends into the neighboring Deerlodge and Bitterroot National Forests. The Beaverhead section includes most of the Pioneer, Gravelly, and Sapphire Ranges. Both the Centennial and Bitterroot mountain ranges are also located here, with the Continental divide found in the Bitterroot range. Lemhi Pass, at an elevation 7,323 feet (2,232 m) above sea level, is a rounded saddle in the Beaverhead Mountains of the Bitterroot Range, along the Continental Divide, between Montana and Idaho. Here, in 1805, the Lewis and Clark Expedition first saw the headwaters of the Columbia River, which flow to the Pacific Ocean, and crossed what was then the western boundary of the United States. Lemhi Pass was the point at which the members of the expedition realized that there was not a waterway that would lead from east to west across the continent. Lemhi Pass was designated a National Historic Landmark in 1960. The Lee Metcalf Wilderness, in the Madison mountain range, is a part of what is known as the Greater Yellowstone Ecosystem. However, most of the Lee Metcalf lies in neighboring Gallatin National Forest. The Beaverhead section lies, in descending order of land area, in parts of Beaverhead, Madison, Deer Lodge, and Silver Bow counties. There are local ranger district offices located in Dillon, Ennis, Wisdom, and Wise River.

The smaller Deerlodge National Forest portion of 1,227,155 acres (4,966.12 km^{2}), at 37% of the total area of the forest, encompasses much of the Tobacco Root Mountains and Flint Creek Range and parts of the Elkhorn Mountains; it straddles the Continental Divide in the Boulder and Highland Mountains. A number of ghost towns serve as reminders of the extensive mining history of the region. The Deerlodge portion of the forest, located northwest of the Beaverhead portion, lies in sections of Granite, Jefferson, Silver Bow, Deer Lodge, Powell, and Madison counties. There are local ranger district offices located in Butte, Philipsburg, and Whitehall.

Ponderosa pine, and various species of fir, spruce and juniper are the dominant tree species. Almost a third of the forest lands have no forest at all, and are instead rangeland with sagebrush, grass and the occasional cactus. The forest is also home to grizzly bear, cougar, Canadian lynx, bald eagle, bull trout, Arctic grayling, and gray wolf, the latter being a migrant from northern Montana and the Yellowstone wolf reintroduction program in Wyoming. Elk, mule deer, moose, bighorn sheep, pronghorn, coyote, and black bear are more commonly seen.

The highest mountains in the forest top out at over 11,000 feet (3,400 m). The Continental Divide National Scenic Trail and the Nez Perce National Historical Trail both pass through sections of the forest. In total, there are over 1,500 miles (2,400 km) of hiking trails, 50 campgrounds, dozens of lake and river boating access points and even 250 miles (400 km) of groomed snowmobile trails.

Forest Service offices administering the National Forest are in Butte, Dillon (which is the headquarters location), Philipsburg, Deer Lodge, Whitehall, Boulder, Ennis, Sheridan, Wise River, Wisdom, and Lima. Interstate 15 and Interstate 90, Montana Highway 43 and Montana Highway 278, and the Pioneer Mountains Scenic Byway all provide access to forest service roads, trailheads and local communities near the forest.

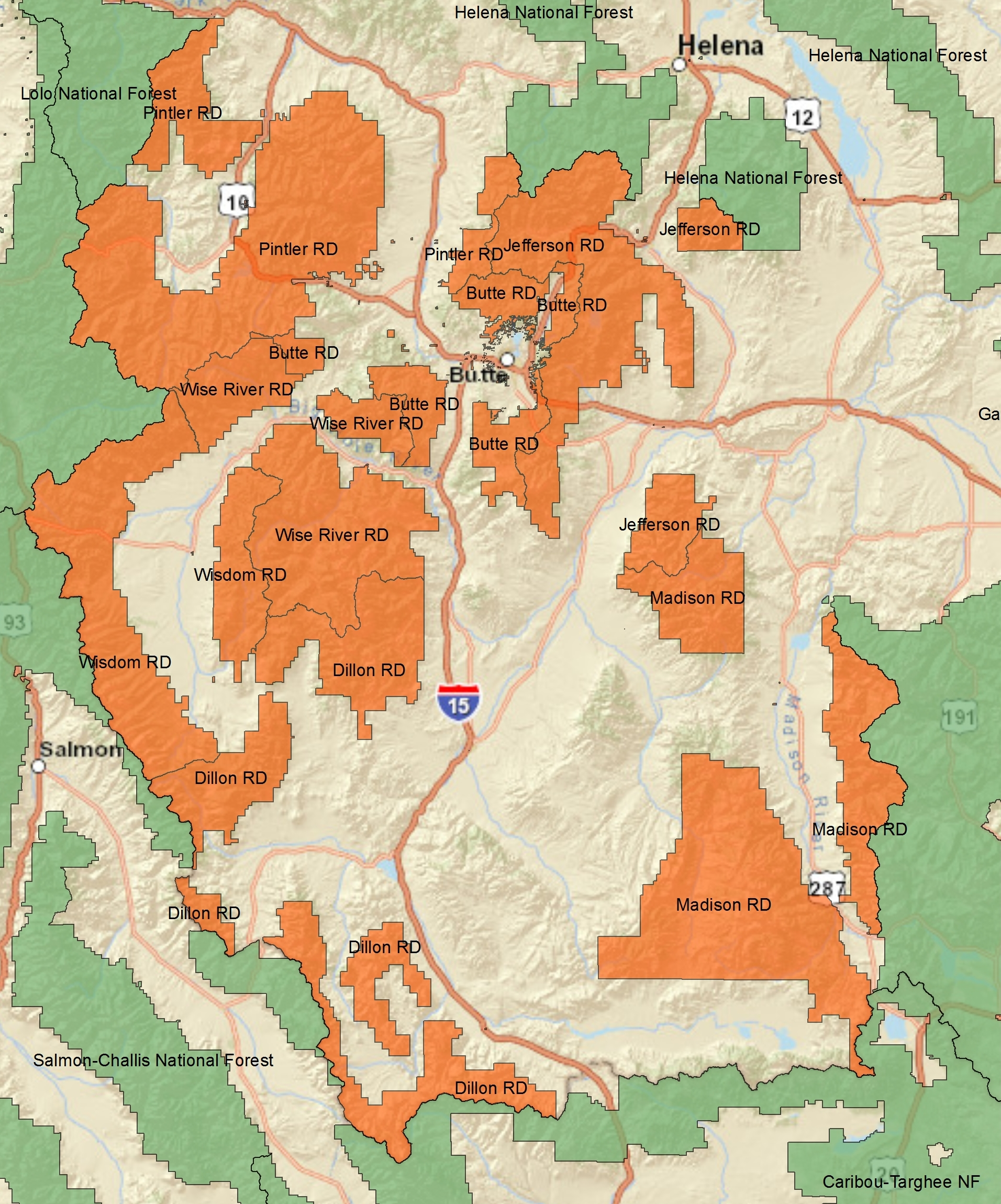
A map of Beaverhead–Deerlodge National Forest

== See also ==
- List of national forests of the United States
- Big Hole River
- Butte, Montana
- List of forests in Montana
