= List of mountain peaks of Montana =

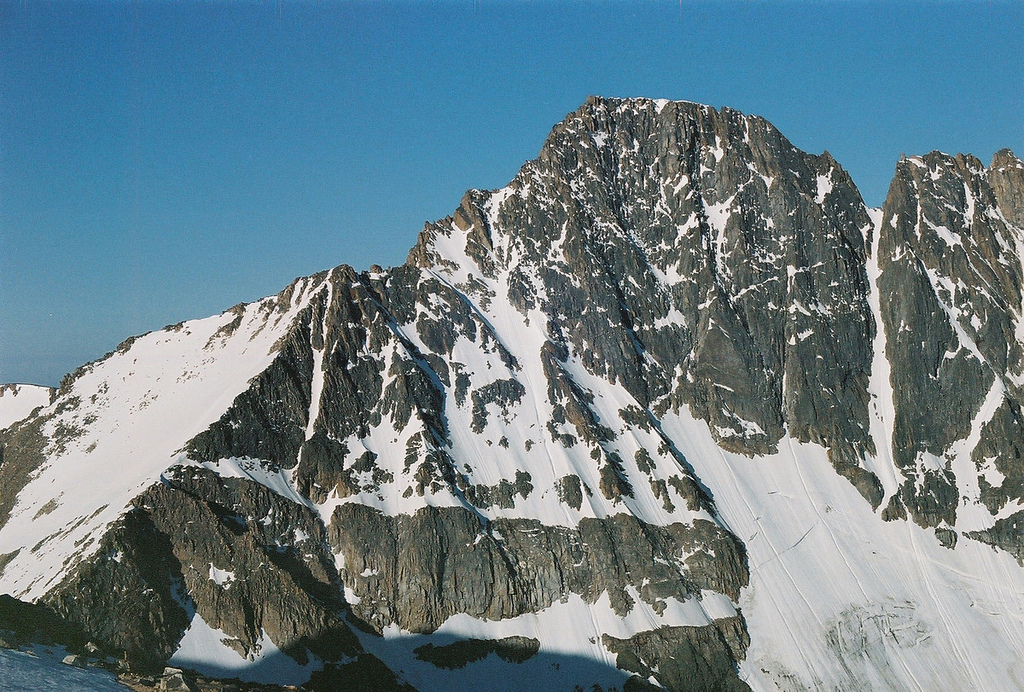
Granite Peak is the highest peak of the Beartooth Range and the U.S. State of Montana.

This article comprises three sortable tables of major mountain peaks of the U.S. State of Montana.

The summit of a mountain or hill may be measured in three principal ways:

1. The topographic elevation of a summit measures the height of the summit above a geodetic sea level. The first table below ranks the 50 highest major summits of Montana by elevation.
2. The topographic prominence of a summit is a measure of how high the summit rises above its surroundings. The second table below ranks the 50 most prominent summits of Montana.
3. The topographic isolation (or radius of dominance) of a summit measures how far the summit lies from its nearest point of equal elevation. The third table below ranks the 50 most isolated major summits of Montana.

== Highest major summits ==
Of the highest major summits of Montana, three peaks exceed 3500 meters (11,483 feet) elevation and 44 peaks exceed 3000 meters (9843 feet) elevation.

The 50 highest summits of Montana with at least 500 meters of topographic prominence
Rank	Mountain peak	Mountain range	Elevation	Prominence	Isolation	Location
1	Granite Peak (Note: The summit of Granite Peak is the highest point of the Beartooth Mountains and the U.S. State of Montana.)	Beartooth Mountains	12,807 ft 3903.5 m	4,779 ft 1457 m	86 mi 138.5 km	45.1634°N 109.8075°W
2	Mount Wood (Note: The summit of Mount Wood is the highest point of the Granite Range.) (Note: The elevation of Mount Wood includes an adjustment of +1.516 m (4.97 ft) from NGVD 29 to NAVD 88.)	Absaroka Range	12,665 ft 3860 m	2,880 ft 878 m	7.48 mi 12.04 km	45.2749°N 109.8078°W
3	Castle Mountain	Absaroka Range	12,618 ft 3846.1 m	2,672 ft 814 m	9.74 mi 15.67 km	45.0989°N 109.6305°W
4	Tumble Mountain (Note: The summit of Tumble Mountain is the highest point of the Lake Plateau.)	Absaroka Range	11,329 ft 3453 m	2,844 ft 867 m	8.26 mi 13.29 km	45.3227°N 110.0262°W
5	Hilgard Peak (Note: The summit of Hilgard Peak is the highest point of the Madison Range.) (Note: The elevation of Hilgard Peak includes an adjustment of +1.49 m (4.89 ft) from NGVD 29 to NAVD 88.)	Madison Range	11,321 ft 3451 m	4,063 ft 1238 m	76.4 mi 123 km	44.9166°N 111.4593°W
6	Mount Douglas (Note: The elevation of Mount Douglas includes an adjustment of +1.501 m (4.92 ft) from NGVD 29 to NAVD 88.)	Absaroka Range	11,287 ft 3440 m	1,662 ft 507 m	5.62 mi 9.05 km	45.3068°N 110.1395°W
7	Mount Cowen (Note: The elevation of Mount Cowen includes an adjustment of +1.469 m (4.82 ft) from NGVD 29 to NAVD 88.)	Absaroka Range	11,217 ft 3419 m	2,672 ft 814 m	17.8 mi 28.7 km	45.3892°N 110.4858°W
8	Crazy Peak (Note: The summit of Crazy Peak is the highest point of the Crazy Mountains.) (Note: The elevation of Crazy Peak includes an adjustment of +1.421 m (4.66 ft) from NGVD 29 to NAVD 88.)	Crazy Mountains	11,214 ft 3418 m	5,719 ft 1743 m	44.6 mi 71.8 km	46.0181°N 110.2768°W
9	Two Sisters (Note: The elevation of Two Sisters includes an adjustment of +1.398 m (4.59 ft) from NGVD 29 to NAVD 88.)	Absaroka Range	11,195 ft 3412 m	1,850 ft 564 m	4.09 mi 6.58 km	45.2634°N 110.0237°W
10	Lone Mountain (Note: The elevation of Lone Mountain includes an adjustment of +1.482 m (4.86 ft) from NGVD 29 to NAVD 88.)	Madison Range	11,167 ft 3404 m	2,742 ft 836 m	16.67 mi 26.8 km	45.2783°N 111.4505°W
11	Tweedy Mountain (Note: The summit of Tweedy Mountain is the highest point of the Pioneer Mountains.) (Note: The elevation of Tweedy Mountain includes an adjustment of +1.598 m (5.24 ft) from NGVD 29 to NAVD 88.)	Pioneer Mountains	11,159 ft 3401 m	3,814 ft 1163 m	75 mi 120.7 km	45.4805°N 112.9655°W
12	Gallatin Peak (Note: The elevation of Gallatin Peak includes an adjustment of +1.52 m (4.99 ft) from NGVD 29 to NAVD 88.)	Madison Range	11,020 ft 3359 m	3,197 ft 974 m	7.46 mi 12 km	45.3682°N 111.3658°W
13	Electric Peak (Note: The summit of Electric Peak is the highest point of the Gallatin Range.)	Gallatin Range	10,997 ft 3351.8 m	3,399 ft 1036 m	30.1 mi 48.5 km	45.0053°N 110.8376°W
14	Garfield Mountain (Montana)	Bitterroot Range	10,966 ft 3342.4 m	3,301 ft 1006 m	15.18 mi 24.4 km	44.5204°N 112.6210°W
15	Emigrant Peak	Absaroka Range	10,925 ft 3330 m	2,609 ft 795 m	13.86 mi 22.3 km	45.2629°N 110.7071°W
16	Sphinx Mountain (Note: The elevation of Sphinx Mountain includes an adjustment of +1.495 m (4.9 ft) from NGVD 29 to NAVD 88.)	Madison Range	10,881 ft 3317 m	2,096 ft 639 m	8.21 mi 13.21 km	45.1578°N 111.4792°W
17	West Goat Peak (Note: The summit of West Goat Peak is the highest point of the Anaconda Range.) (Note: The elevation of West Goat Peak includes an adjustment of +1.52 m (4.99 ft) from NGVD 29 to NAVD 88.)	Anaconda Range	10,798 ft 3291 m	3,973 ft 1211 m	39.1 mi 62.9 km	45.9625°N 113.3949°W
18	Cutoff Mountain (Note: The elevation of Cutoff Mountain includes an adjustment of +1.31 m (4.3 ft) from NGVD 29 to NAVD 88.)	Absaroka Range	10,702 ft 3262 m	1,755 ft 535 m	5.66 mi 9.11 km	45.0321°N 110.1154°W
19	Sage Peak (Note: The elevation of Sage Peak includes an adjustment of +1.438 m (4.72 ft) from NGVD 29 to NAVD 88.)	Madison Range	10,658 ft 3248 m	2,073 ft 632 m	10.44 mi 16.8 km	44.9331°N 111.2477°W
20	Mount Evans (Note: The elevation of Mount Evans includes an adjustment of +1.543 m (5.06 ft) from NGVD 29 to NAVD 88.)	Anaconda Range	10,646 ft 3245 m	2,061 ft 628 m	11.55 mi 18.59 km	46.0501°N 113.1903°W
21	Homer Youngs Peak (Note: The summit of Homer Youngs Peak is the highest point of the West Big Hole Mountains.) (Note: The elevation of Homer Youngs Peak includes an adjustment of +1.483 m (4.87 ft) from NGVD 29 to NAVD 88.)	Bitterroot Range	10,626 ft 3239 m	3,201 ft 976 m	35.5 mi 57.2 km	45.3111°N 113.6773°W
22	South Sheep Mountain (Note: The summit of South Sheep Mountain is the highest point of the Lionshead Mountains.) (Note: The elevation of South Sheep Mountain includes an adjustment of +1.431 m (4.69 ft) from NGVD 29 to NAVD 88.)	Lionshead Mountains	10,611 ft 3234 m	3,676 ft 1120 m	11.12 mi 17.89 km	44.7632°N 111.3906°W
23	Hollowtop Mountain (Note: The summit of Hollowtop Mountain is the highest point of the Tobacco Root Mountains.) (Note: The elevation of Hollowtop Mountain includes an adjustment of +1.486 m (4.88 ft) from NGVD 29 to NAVD 88.)	Tobacco Root Mountains	10,609 ft 3234 m	3,904 ft 1190 m	34 mi 54.8 km	45.6116°N 112.0083°W
24	Sunset Peak (Note: The summit of Sunset Peak is the highest point of the Snowcrest Range.) (Note: The elevation of Sunset Peak includes an adjustment of +1.553 m (5.1 ft) from NGVD 29 to NAVD 88.)	Snowcrest Range	10,586 ft 3227 m	3,761 ft 1146 m	31.2 mi 50.3 km	44.8559°N 112.1468°W
25	Hogback Mountain (Note: The elevation of Hogback Mountain includes an adjustment of +1.514 m (4.97 ft) from NGVD 29 to NAVD 88.)	Snowcrest Range	10,585 ft 3226 m	1,920 ft 585 m	2.88 mi 4.64 km	44.8944°N 112.1238°W
26	Black Butte (Note: The summit of Black Butte is the highest point of the Gravelly Range.) (Note: The summit elevation of Black Butte includes a vertical offset of +1 m (3.3 ft) from the station benchmark.)	Gravelly Range	10,554 ft 3217 m	3,202 ft 976 m	13.2 mi 21.3 km	44.9042°N 111.8550°W
27	Sheep Mountain	Absaroka Range	10,551 ft 3216 m	1,767 ft 539 m	10.02 mi 16.12 km	45.1131°N 110.7007°W
28	Mount Cleveland (Note: The summit of Mount Cleveland is the highest point of the Lewis Range.)	Lewis Range	10,479 ft 3194 m	5,246 ft 1599 m	99.4 mi 159.9 km	48.9249°N 113.8482°W
29	Sliderock Mountain (Note: The elevation of Sliderock Mountain includes an adjustment of +1.49 m (4.89 ft) from NGVD 29 to NAVD 88.)	Snowcrest Range	10,444 ft 3183 m	2,259 ft 689 m	4.83 mi 7.77 km	44.9426°N 112.0520°W
30	Mount Chisholm (Note: The elevation of Mount Chisholm includes an adjustment of +1.532 m (5.03 ft) from NGVD 29 to NAVD 88.)	Gallatin Range	10,338 ft 3151 m	2,018 ft 615 m	14.57 mi 23.5 km	45.4037°N 110.9300°W
31	Fan Mountain (Note: The elevation of Fan Mountain includes an adjustment of +1.42 m (4.66 ft) from NGVD 29 to NAVD 88.)	Madison Range	10,312 ft 3143 m	2,687 ft 819 m	3.82 mi 6.15 km	45.2980°N 111.5238°W
32	Table Mountain (Note: The summit of Table Mountain is the highest point of the Highland Mountains.) (Note: The elevation of Table Mountain includes an adjustment of +1.467 m (4.81 ft) from NGVD 29 to NAVD 88.)	Highland Mountains	10,228 ft 3117 m	4,422 ft 1348 m	19.3 mi 31.1 km	45.7426°N 112.4619°W
33	Mount Jefferson (Note: The summit of Mount Jefferson is the highest point of the Centennial Mountains.) (Note: Mount Jefferson lies on the Continental Divide of the Americas between Idaho and Montana.)	Bitterroot Range	10,216 ft 3113.7 m	3,383 ft 1031 m	11.2 mi 18.02 km	44.5620°N 111.5049°W
34	Mount Powell (Note: The summit of Mount Powell is the highest point of the Flint Creek Range.)	Flint Creek Range	10,173 ft 3100.7 m	3,746 ft 1142 m	19 mi 30.6 km	46.3499°N 112.9798°W
35	Trapper Peak (Note: The summit of Trapper Peak is the highest point of the central Bitterroot Range.) (Note: The elevation of Trapper Peak includes an adjustment of +1.367 m (4.48 ft) from NGVD 29 to NAVD 88.)	Bitterroot Range	10,162 ft 3097 m	3,570 ft 1088 m	40.8 mi 65.6 km	45.8898°N 114.2978°W
36	Mount Stimson	Lewis Range	10,146 ft 3092.6 m	4,402 ft 1342 m	30 mi 48.3 km	48.5142°N 113.6104°W
37	Kintla Peak (Note: The summit of Kintla Peak is the highest point of the Livingston Range.) (Note: The elevation of Kintla Peak includes an adjustment of +1.413 m (4.64 ft) from NGVD 29 to NAVD 88.)	Livingston Range	10,106 ft 3080 m	4,401 ft 1341 m	14.78 mi 23.8 km	48.9437°N 114.1714°W
38	Mount Jackson (Note: The elevation of Mount Jackson includes an adjustment of +1.425 m (4.68 ft) from NGVD 29 to NAVD 88.)	Lewis Range	10,057 ft 3065 m	3,406 ft 1038 m	7.88 mi 12.68 km	48.6006°N 113.7226°W
39	Mount Siyeh (Note: The elevation of Mount Siyeh includes an adjustment of +1.435 m (4.71 ft) from NGVD 29 to NAVD 88.)	Lewis Range	10,019 ft 3054 m	3,106 ft 947 m	9.45 mi 15.21 km	48.7286°N 113.6499°W
40	Mount Merritt (Note: The elevation of Mount Merritt includes an adjustment of +1.372 m (4.5 ft) from NGVD 29 to NAVD 88.)	Lewis Range	10,009 ft 3051 m	2,904 ft 885 m	4.71 mi 7.58 km	48.8702°N 113.7866°W
41	El Capitan (Note: The elevation of El Capitan includes an adjustment of +1.251 m (4.1 ft) from NGVD 29 to NAVD 88.)	Bitterroot Range	9,987 ft 3044 m	1,978 ft 603 m	9.43 mi 15.17 km	46.0074°N 114.3970°W
42	Baldy Mountain (Note: The elevation of Baldy Mountain includes an adjustment of +1.436 m (4.71 ft) from NGVD 29 to NAVD 88.)	Bitterroot Range	9,905 ft 3019 m	2,360 ft 719 m	18.08 mi 29.1 km	44.5684°N 111.8709°W
43	Rainbow Peak (Note: The elevation of Rainbow Peak includes an adjustment of +1.362 m (4.47 ft) from NGVD 29 to NAVD 88.)	Livingston Range	9,895 ft 3016 m	3,636 ft 1108 m	5.62 mi 9.05 km	48.8786°N 114.0974°W
44	Taylor Mountain (Note: Taylor Mountain lies on the Continental Divide of the Americas between Idaho and Montana.)	Bitterroot Range	9,860 ft 3005.2 m	1,880 ft 573 m	8.79 mi 14.15 km	44.5616°N 111.6830°W
45	McDonald Peak (Note: The summit of McDonald Peak is the highest point of the Mission Range.) (Note: The elevation of McDonald Peak includes an adjustment of +1.318 m (4.32 ft) from NGVD 29 to NAVD 88.)	Mission Range	9,824 ft 2994 m	5,650 ft 1722 m	79.4 mi 127.8 km	47.3826°N 113.9191°W
46	Sacagawea Peak (Bridger Range, Montana) (Note: The summit of Sacagawea Peak (Bridger Range, Montana) is the highest point of the Bridger Range.)	Bridger Range	9,670 ft 2947.5 m	3,950 ft 1204 m	29.1 mi 46.8 km	45.8958°N 110.9686°W
47	Saint Joseph Peak	Bitterroot Range	9,592 ft 2923.5 m	3,407 ft 1038 m	41.4 mi 66.7 km	46.6015°N 114.2550°W
48	Mount Edith (Note: The summit of Mount Edith is the highest point of the Big Belt Mountains.) (Note: The elevation of Mount Edith includes an adjustment of +1.249 m (4.1 ft) from NGVD 29 to NAVD 88.)	Big Belt Mountains	9,504 ft 2897 m	4,110 ft 1253 m	37 mi 59.5 km	46.4318°N 111.1862°W
49	Crow Peak (Note: The summit of Crow Peak is the highest point of the Elkhorn Mountains.) (Note: The elevation of Crow Peak includes an adjustment of +1.353 m (4.44 ft) from NGVD 29 to NAVD 88.)	Elkhorn Mountains	9,418 ft 2871 m	3,805 ft 1160 m	32.9 mi 53 km	46.2940°N 111.9037°W
50	Red Mountain (Note: The summit of Red Mountain is the highest point of the Flathead Range.)	Flathead Range	9,413 ft 2869.1 m	3,801 ft 1159 m	52.4 mi 84.3 km	47.1166°N 112.7388°W

== Most prominent summits ==
Of the most prominent summits of Montana, four peaks are ultra-prominent summits with more than 1500 meters (4921 feet) of topographic prominence and 39 peaks exceed 1000 meters (3281 feet) of topographic prominence.

The 50 most topographically prominent summits of Montana
Rank	Mountain peak	Mountain range	Elevation	Prominence	Isolation	Location
1	Crazy Peak	Crazy Mountains	11,214 ft 3418 m	5,719 ft 1743 m	44.6 mi 71.8 km	46.0181°N 110.2768°W
2	McDonald Peak	Mission Range	9,824 ft 2994 m	5,650 ft 1722 m	79.4 mi 127.8 km	47.3826°N 113.9191°W
3	Snowshoe Peak (Note: The summit of Snowshoe Peak is the highest point of the Cabinet Mountains.) (Note: The elevation of Snowshoe Peak includes an adjustment of +1.367 m (4.48 ft) from NGVD 29 to NAVD 88.)	Cabinet Mountains	8,743 ft 2665 m	5,438 ft 1658 m	82.9 mi 133.5 km	48.2231°N 115.6890°W
4	Mount Cleveland	Lewis Range	10,479 ft 3194 m	5,246 ft 1599 m	99.4 mi 159.9 km	48.9249°N 113.8482°W
5	Granite Peak	Beartooth Mountains	12,807 ft 3903.5 m	4,779 ft 1457 m	86 mi 138.5 km	45.1634°N 109.8075°W
6	Northwest Peak (Note: The summit of Northwest Peak is the highest point of the Buckhorn Mountains.) (Note: The elevation of Northwest Peak includes an adjustment of +1.339 m (4.39 ft) from NGVD 29 to NAVD 88.)	Columbia Mountains	7,709 ft 2350 m	4,455 ft 1358 m	24.1 mi 38.8 km	48.9632°N 115.9683°W
7	Table Mountain	Highland Mountains	10,228 ft 3117 m	4,422 ft 1348 m	19.3 mi 31.1 km	45.7426°N 112.4619°W
8	Mount Stimson	Lewis Range	10,146 ft 3092.6 m	4,402 ft 1342 m	30 mi 48.3 km	48.5142°N 113.6104°W
9	Kintla Peak	Livingston Range	10,106 ft 3080 m	4,401 ft 1341 m	14.78 mi 23.8 km	48.9437°N 114.1714°W
10	Big Pryor Mountain (Note: The summit of Big Pryor Mountain is the highest point of the Pryor Mountains.)	Pryor Mountains	8,789 ft 2679 m	4,296 ft 1309 m	25.9 mi 41.7 km	45.1607°N 108.4692°W
11	Baldy Mountain (Note: The summit of Baldy Mountain is the highest point of the Bearpaw Mountains.) (Bearpaw Baldy)	Bearpaw Mountains	6,921 ft 2109.4 m	4,229 ft 1289 m	62.8 mi 101 km	48.1487°N 109.6509°W
12	Mount Edith (Note: The summit of Mount Edith is the highest point of the Big Belt Mountains.) (Note: The elevation of Mount Edith includes an adjustment of +1.249 m (4.1 ft) from NGVD 29 to NAVD 88.)	Big Belt Mountains	9,504 ft 2897 m	4,110 ft 1253 m	37 mi 59.5 km	46.4318°N 111.1862°W
13	Baldy Mountain	Salish Mountains	7,469 ft 2276.7 m	4,084 ft 1245 m	27.7 mi 44.6 km	47.6214°N 114.8246°W
14	Greathouse Peak (Note: The summit of Greathouse Peak is the highest point of the Big Snowy Mountains.) (Note: The elevation of Greathouse Peak includes an adjustment of +1.136 m (3.73 ft) from NGVD 29 to NAVD 88.)	Big Snowy Mountains	8,685 ft 2647 m	4,071 ft 1241 m	55.9 mi 89.9 km	46.7683°N 109.3567°W
15	Hilgard Peak	Madison Range	11,321 ft 3451 m	4,063 ft 1238 m	76.4 mi 123 km	44.9166°N 111.4593°W
16	Holland Peak (Note: The summit of Holland Peak is the highest point of the Swan Range.)	Swan Range	9,361 ft 2853.2 m	4,016 ft 1224 m	18.96 mi 30.5 km	47.5351°N 113.5824°W
16	Ch-paa-qn Peak (Note: The summit of Ch-paa-qn Peak is the highest point of the Reservation Divide.)	Reservation Divide	8,000 ft 2438.4 m	4,016 ft 1224 m	19.26 mi 31 km	47.1579°N 114.3560°W
18	West Goat Peak	Anaconda Range	10,798 ft 3291 m	3,973 ft 1211 m	39.1 mi 62.9 km	45.9625°N 113.3949°W
19	Sacagawea Peak (Bridger Range, Montana)	Bridger Range	9,670 ft 2947.5 m	3,950 ft 1204 m	29.1 mi 46.8 km	45.8958°N 110.9686°W
20	Hollowtop Mountain	Tobacco Root Mountains	10,609 ft 3234 m	3,904 ft 1190 m	34 mi 54.8 km	45.6116°N 112.0083°W
21	Tweedy Mountain	Pioneer Mountains	11,159 ft 3401 m	3,814 ft 1163 m	75 mi 120.7 km	45.4805°N 112.9655°W
22	Crow Peak	Elkhorn Mountains	9,418 ft 2871 m	3,805 ft 1160 m	32.9 mi 53 km	46.2940°N 111.9037°W
23	Red Mountain	Flathead Range	9,413 ft 2869.1 m	3,801 ft 1159 m	52.4 mi 84.3 km	47.1166°N 112.7388°W
24	Robinson Mountain (Lincoln County)	Purcell Mountains	7,542 ft 2298.91 m	3,766 ft 1148 m	20.2 mi 32.6 km	48.9671°N 115.4122°W
25	Sunset Peak	Snowcrest Range	10,586 ft 3227 m	3,761 ft 1146 m	31.2 mi 50.3 km	44.8559°N 112.1468°W
26	McLeod Peak (Note: The summit of McLeod Peak is the highest point of the Rattlesnake Mountains.)	Rattlesnake Mountains	8,624 ft 2628.7 m	3,760 ft 1146 m	13.55 mi 21.8 km	47.0952°N 113.9229°W
27	Mount Powell	Flint Creek Range	10,173 ft 3100.7 m	3,746 ft 1142 m	19 mi 30.6 km	46.3499°N 112.9798°W
28	Mount Headley	Cabinet Mountains	7,430 ft 2264.6 m	3,716 ft 1133 m	19.5 mi 31.4 km	47.7399°N 115.2637°W
29	South Sheep Mountain	Lionshead Mountains	10,611 ft 3234 m	3,676 ft 1120 m	11.12 mi 17.89 km	44.7632°N 111.3906°W
30	West Butte (Note: The summit of West Butte is the highest point of the Sweetgrass Hills.) (Note: The elevation of West Butte includes an adjustment of +1.061 m (3.48 ft) from NGVD 29 to NAVD 88.)	Sweetgrass Hills	6,986 ft 2129 m	3,638 ft 1109 m	80.9 mi 130.2 km	48.9316°N 111.5324°W
31	Rainbow Peak	Livingston Range	9,895 ft 3016 m	3,636 ft 1108 m	5.62 mi 9.05 km	48.8786°N 114.0974°W
32	Trapper Peak	Bitterroot Range	10,162 ft 3097 m	3,570 ft 1088 m	40.8 mi 65.6 km	45.8898°N 114.2978°W
33	Big Baldy Mountain (Note: The summit of Big Baldy Mountain is the highest point of the Little Belt Mountains.) (Note: The elevation of Big Baldy Mountain includes an adjustment of +1.183 m (3.88 ft) from NGVD 29 to NAVD 88.)	Little Belt Mountains	9,181 ft 2798 m	3,567 ft 1087 m	45.8 mi 73.6 km	46.9685°N 110.6064°W
34	Saint Joseph Peak	Bitterroot Range	9,592 ft 2923.5 m	3,407 ft 1038 m	41.4 mi 66.7 km	46.6015°N 114.2550°W
35	Mount Jackson	Lewis Range	10,057 ft 3065 m	3,406 ft 1038 m	7.88 mi 12.68 km	48.6006°N 113.7226°W
36	Electric Peak	Gallatin Range	10,997 ft 3351.8 m	3,399 ft 1036 m	30.1 mi 48.5 km	45.0053°N 110.8376°W
37	Mount Jefferson	Bitterroot Range	10,216 ft 3113.7 m	3,383 ft 1031 m	11.2 mi 18.02 km	44.5620°N 111.5049°W
38	Garfield Mountain (Montana)	Bitterroot Range	10,966 ft 3342.4 m	3,301 ft 1006 m	15.18 mi 24.4 km	44.5204°N 112.6210°W
39	Highwood Baldy (Note: The summit of Highwood Baldy is the highest point of the Highwood Mountains.)	Highwood Mountains	7,679 ft 2340.7 m	3,300 ft 1006 m	22 mi 35.4 km	47.4420°N 110.6309°W
40	Rocky Mountain (Note: The summit of Rocky Mountain is the highest point of the Rocky Mountain Front.)	Rocky Mountain Front	9,398 ft 2864.4 m	3,252 ft 991 m	48.1 mi 77.4 km	47.8123°N 112.8003°W
41	Black Butte	Gravelly Range	10,554 ft 3217 m	3,202 ft 976 m	13.2 mi 21.3 km	44.9042°N 111.8550°W
42	Homer Youngs Peak	Bitterroot Range	10,626 ft 3239 m	3,201 ft 976 m	35.5 mi 57.2 km	45.3111°N 113.6773°W
43	Gallatin Peak	Madison Range	11,020 ft 3359 m	3,197 ft 974 m	7.46 mi 12 km	45.3682°N 111.3658°W
44	Mount Siyeh	Lewis Range	10,019 ft 3054 m	3,106 ft 947 m	9.45 mi 15.21 km	48.7286°N 113.6499°W
45	Mount Merritt	Lewis Range	10,009 ft 3051 m	2,904 ft 885 m	4.71 mi 7.58 km	48.8702°N 113.7866°W
46	Mount Wood	Absaroka Range	12,665 ft 3860 m	2,880 ft 878 m	7.48 mi 12.04 km	45.2749°N 109.8078°W
47	Tumble Mountain	Absaroka Range	11,329 ft 3453 m	2,844 ft 867 m	8.26 mi 13.29 km	45.3227°N 110.0262°W
48	Lone Mountain	Madison Range	11,167 ft 3404 m	2,742 ft 836 m	16.67 mi 26.8 km	45.2783°N 111.4505°W
49	Antoine Butte (Note: The summit of Antoine Butte is the highest point of the Little Rocky Mountains.) (Note: The elevation of Antoine Butte includes an adjustment of +0.875 m (2.87 ft) from NGVD 29 to NAVD 88.)	Little Rocky Mountains	5,743 ft 1750 m	2,695 ft 821 m	45 mi 72.4 km	47.9321°N 108.5779°W
50	Fan Mountain	Madison Range	10,312 ft 3143 m	2,687 ft 819 m	3.82 mi 6.15 km	45.2980°N 111.5238°W

== Most isolated major summits ==
Of the most isolated major summits of Montana, eight peaks exceed 100 kilometers (62.14 miles) of topographic isolation .

The 50 most topographically isolated summits of Montana with at least 500 meters of topographic prominence
Rank	Mountain peak	Mountain range	Elevation	Prominence	Isolation	Location
1	Mount Cleveland	Lewis Range	10,479 ft 3194 m	5,246 ft 1599 m	99.4 mi 159.9 km	48.9249°N 113.8482°W
2	Granite Peak	Beartooth Mountains	12,807 ft 3903.5 m	4,779 ft 1457 m	86 mi 138.5 km	45.1634°N 109.8075°W
3	Snowshoe Peak	Cabinet Mountains	8,743 ft 2665 m	5,438 ft 1658 m	82.9 mi 133.5 km	48.2231°N 115.6890°W
4	West Butte	Sweetgrass Hills	6,986 ft 2129 m	3,638 ft 1109 m	80.9 mi 130.2 km	48.9316°N 111.5324°W
5	McDonald Peak	Mission Range	9,824 ft 2994 m	5,650 ft 1722 m	79.4 mi 127.8 km	47.3826°N 113.9191°W
6	Hilgard Peak	Madison Range	11,321 ft 3451 m	4,063 ft 1238 m	76.4 mi 123 km	44.9166°N 111.4593°W
7	Tweedy Mountain	Pioneer Mountains	11,159 ft 3401 m	3,814 ft 1163 m	75 mi 120.7 km	45.4805°N 112.9655°W
8	Baldy Mountain (Bearpaw Baldy)	Bearpaw Mountains	6,921 ft 2109.4 m	4,229 ft 1289 m	62.8 mi 101 km	48.1487°N 109.6509°W
9	Greathouse Peak	Big Snowy Mountains	8,685 ft 2647 m	4,071 ft 1241 m	55.9 mi 89.9 km	46.7683°N 109.3567°W
10	Red Mountain	Flathead Range	9,413 ft 2869.1 m	3,801 ft 1159 m	52.4 mi 84.3 km	47.1166°N 112.7388°W
11	Rocky Mountain	Rocky Mountain Front	9,398 ft 2864.4 m	3,252 ft 991 m	48.1 mi 77.4 km	47.8123°N 112.8003°W
12	Big Baldy Mountain	Little Belt Mountains	9,181 ft 2798 m	3,567 ft 1087 m	45.8 mi 73.6 km	46.9685°N 110.6064°W
13	Antoine Butte	Little Rocky Mountains	5,743 ft 1750 m	2,695 ft 821 m	45 mi 72.4 km	47.9321°N 108.5779°W
14	Crazy Peak	Crazy Mountains	11,214 ft 3418 m	5,719 ft 1743 m	44.6 mi 71.8 km	46.0181°N 110.2768°W
15	Saint Joseph Peak	Bitterroot Range	9,592 ft 2923.5 m	3,407 ft 1038 m	41.4 mi 66.7 km	46.6015°N 114.2550°W
16	Trapper Peak	Bitterroot Range	10,162 ft 3097 m	3,570 ft 1088 m	40.8 mi 65.6 km	45.8898°N 114.2978°W
17	West Goat Peak	Anaconda Range	10,798 ft 3291 m	3,973 ft 1211 m	39.1 mi 62.9 km	45.9625°N 113.3949°W
18	Mount Edith	Big Belt Mountains	9,504 ft 2897 m	4,110 ft 1253 m	37 mi 59.5 km	46.4318°N 111.1862°W
19	Homer Youngs Peak	Bitterroot Range	10,626 ft 3239 m	3,201 ft 976 m	35.5 mi 57.2 km	45.3111°N 113.6773°W
20	Hollowtop Mountain	Tobacco Root Mountains	10,609 ft 3234 m	3,904 ft 1190 m	34 mi 54.8 km	45.6116°N 112.0083°W
21	Crow Peak	Elkhorn Mountains	9,418 ft 2871 m	3,805 ft 1160 m	32.9 mi 53 km	46.2940°N 111.9037°W
22	Sunset Peak	Snowcrest Range	10,586 ft 3227 m	3,761 ft 1146 m	31.2 mi 50.3 km	44.8559°N 112.1468°W
23	Electric Peak	Gallatin Range	10,997 ft 3351.8 m	3,399 ft 1036 m	30.1 mi 48.5 km	45.0053°N 110.8376°W
24	Mount Stimson	Lewis Range	10,146 ft 3092.6 m	4,402 ft 1342 m	30 mi 48.3 km	48.5142°N 113.6104°W
25	Sacagawea Peak (Bridger Range, Montana)	Bridger Range	9,670 ft 2947.5 m	3,950 ft 1204 m	29.1 mi 46.8 km	45.8958°N 110.9686°W
26	Baldy Mountain	Salish Mountains	7,469 ft 2276.7 m	4,084 ft 1245 m	27.7 mi 44.6 km	47.6214°N 114.8246°W
27	Big Pryor Mountain	Pryor Mountains	8,789 ft 2679 m	4,296 ft 1309 m	25.9 mi 41.7 km	45.1607°N 108.4692°W
28	Northwest Peak	Columbia Mountains	7,709 ft 2350 m	4,455 ft 1358 m	24.1 mi 38.8 km	48.9632°N 115.9683°W
29	Highwood Baldy	Highwood Mountains	7,679 ft 2340.7 m	3,300 ft 1006 m	22 mi 35.4 km	47.4420°N 110.6309°W
30	Robinson Mountain (Lincoln County)	Purcell Mountains	7,542 ft 2298.91 m	3,766 ft 1148 m	20.2 mi 32.6 km	48.9671°N 115.4122°W
31	Mount Headley	Cabinet Mountains	7,430 ft 2264.6 m	3,716 ft 1133 m	19.5 mi 31.4 km	47.7399°N 115.2637°W
32	Table Mountain	Highland Mountains	10,228 ft 3117 m	4,422 ft 1348 m	19.3 mi 31.1 km	45.7426°N 112.4619°W
33	Ch-paa-qn Peak	Reservation Divide	8,000 ft 2438.4 m	4,016 ft 1224 m	19.26 mi 31 km	47.1579°N 114.3560°W
34	Mount Powell	Flint Creek Range	10,173 ft 3100.7 m	3,746 ft 1142 m	19 mi 30.6 km	46.3499°N 112.9798°W
35	Holland Peak	Swan Range	9,361 ft 2853.2 m	4,016 ft 1224 m	18.96 mi 30.5 km	47.5351°N 113.5824°W
36	Baldy Mountain	Bitterroot Range	9,905 ft 3019 m	2,360 ft 719 m	18.08 mi 29.1 km	44.5684°N 111.8709°W
37	Mount Cowen	Absaroka Range	11,217 ft 3419 m	2,672 ft 814 m	17.8 mi 28.7 km	45.3892°N 110.4858°W
38	Lone Mountain	Madison Range	11,167 ft 3404 m	2,742 ft 836 m	16.67 mi 26.8 km	45.2783°N 111.4505°W
39	Garfield Mountain (Montana)	Bitterroot Range	10,966 ft 3342.4 m	3,301 ft 1006 m	15.18 mi 24.4 km	44.5204°N 112.6210°W
40	Kintla Peak	Livingston Range	10,106 ft 3080 m	4,401 ft 1341 m	14.78 mi 23.8 km	48.9437°N 114.1714°W
41	Mount Chisholm	Gallatin Range	10,338 ft 3151 m	2,018 ft 615 m	14.57 mi 23.5 km	45.4037°N 110.9300°W
42	Emigrant Peak	Absaroka Range	10,925 ft 3330 m	2,609 ft 795 m	13.86 mi 22.3 km	45.2629°N 110.7071°W
43	McLeod Peak	Rattlesnake Mountains	8,624 ft 2628.7 m	3,760 ft 1146 m	13.55 mi 21.8 km	47.0952°N 113.9229°W
44	Black Butte	Gravelly Range	10,554 ft 3217 m	3,202 ft 976 m	13.2 mi 21.3 km	44.9042°N 111.8550°W
45	Mount Evans	Anaconda Range	10,646 ft 3245 m	2,061 ft 628 m	11.55 mi 18.59 km	46.0501°N 113.1903°W
46	Mount Jefferson	Bitterroot Range	10,216 ft 3113.7 m	3,383 ft 1031 m	11.2 mi 18.02 km	44.5620°N 111.5049°W
47	South Sheep Mountain	Lionshead Mountains	10,611 ft 3234 m	3,676 ft 1120 m	11.12 mi 17.89 km	44.7632°N 111.3906°W
48	Sage Peak	Madison Range	10,658 ft 3248 m	2,073 ft 632 m	10.44 mi 16.8 km	44.9331°N 111.2477°W
49	Sheep Mountain	Absaroka Range	10,551 ft 3216 m	1,767 ft 539 m	10.02 mi 16.12 km	45.1131°N 110.7007°W
50	Castle Mountain	Absaroka Range	12,618 ft 3846.1 m	2,672 ft 814 m	9.74 mi 15.67 km	45.0989°N 109.6305°W

== Gallery ==
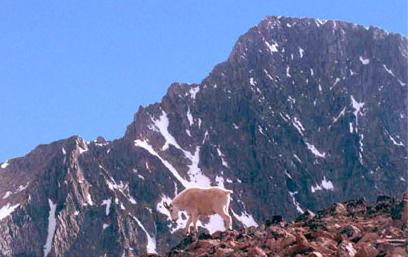
Granite Peak

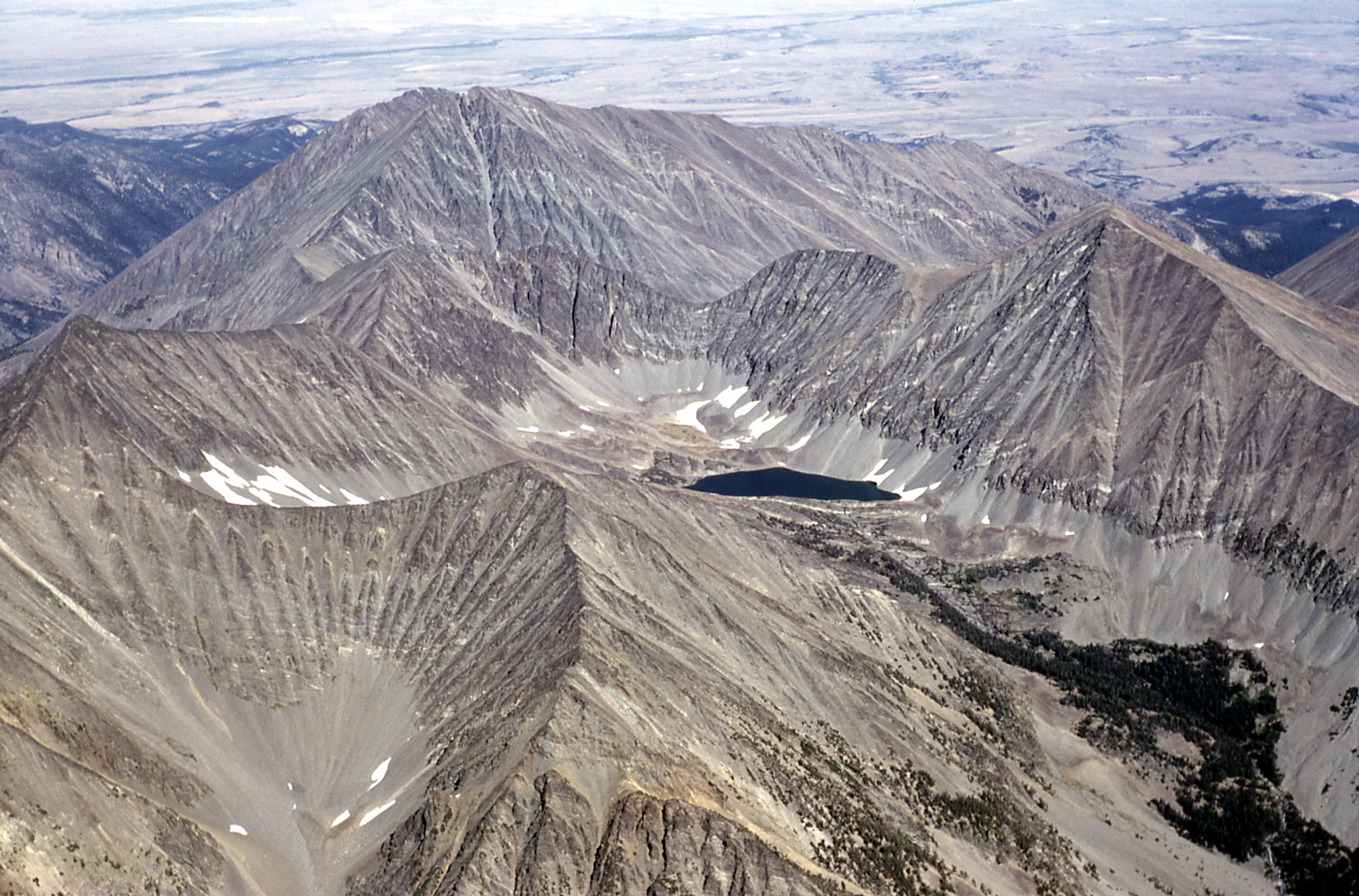
Crazy Peak

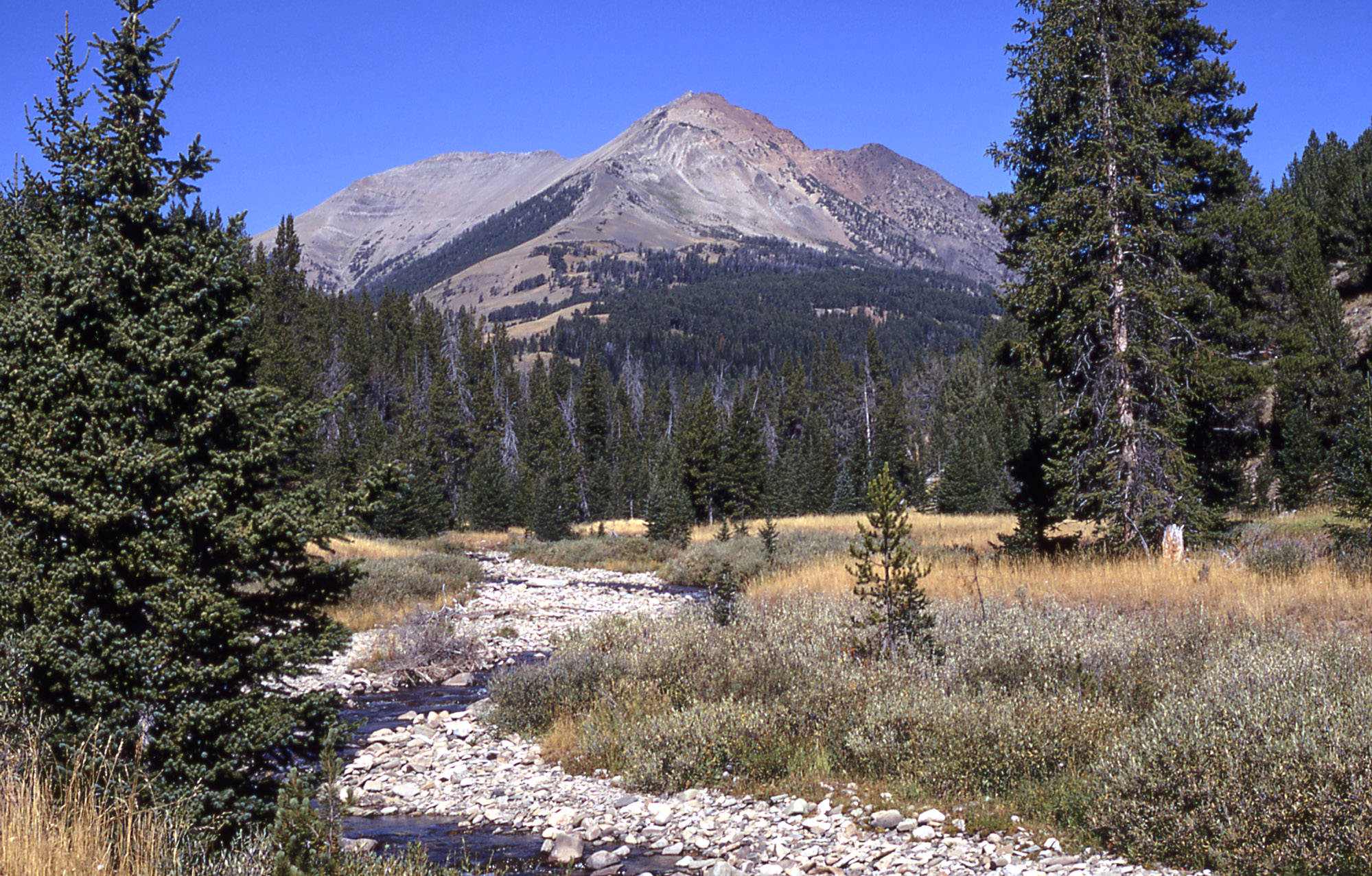
Electric Peak

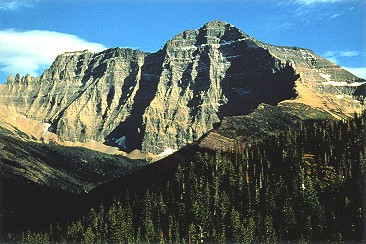
Mount Cleveland

Trapper Peak

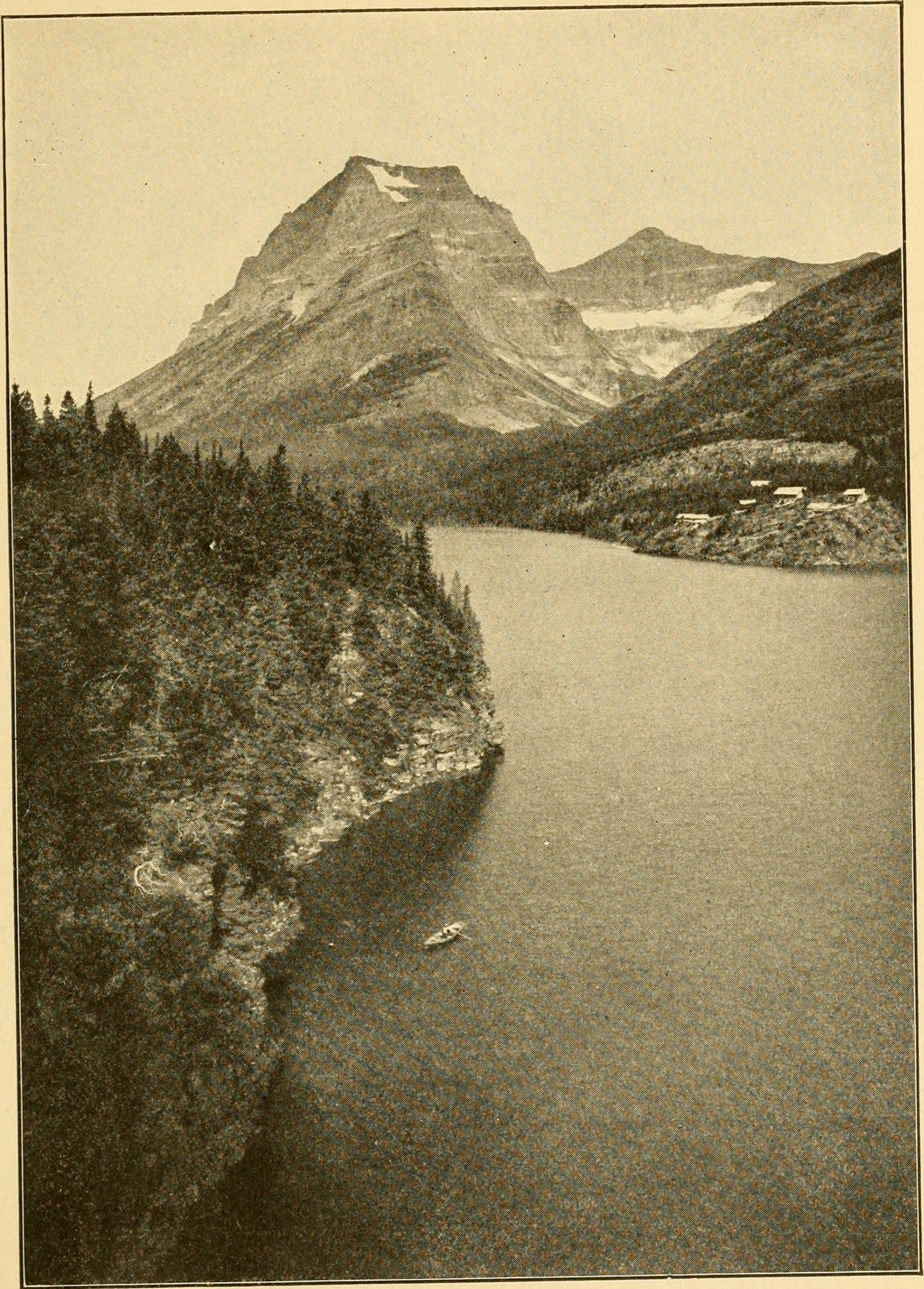
Mount Stimson in 1917

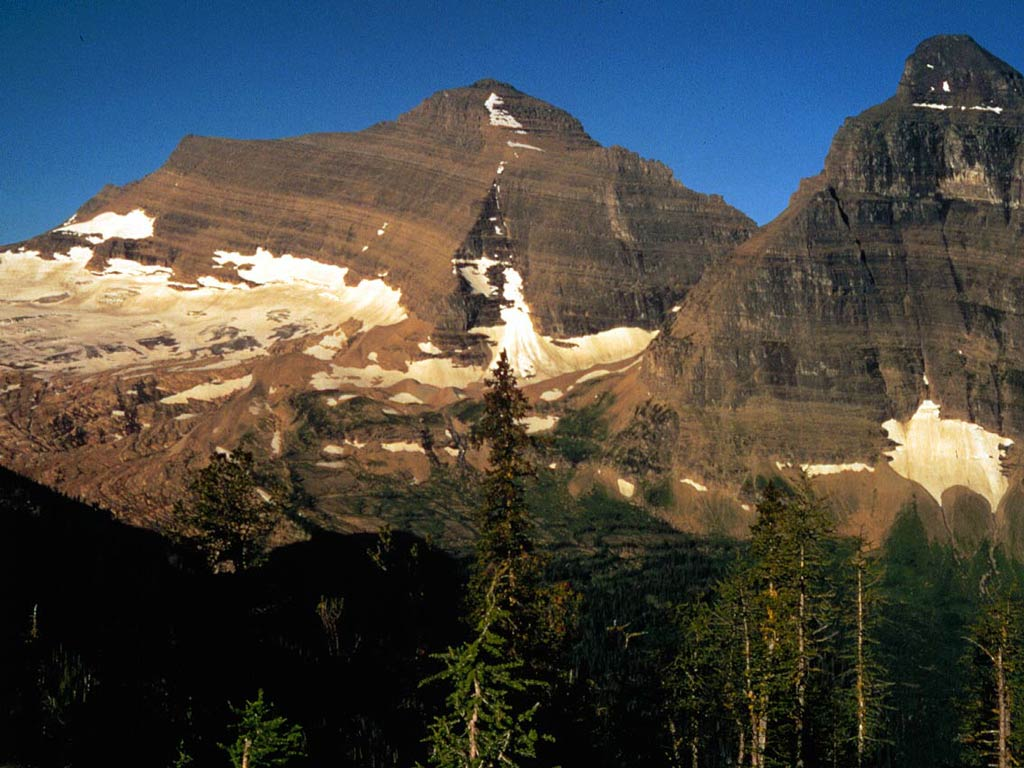
Kintla Peak

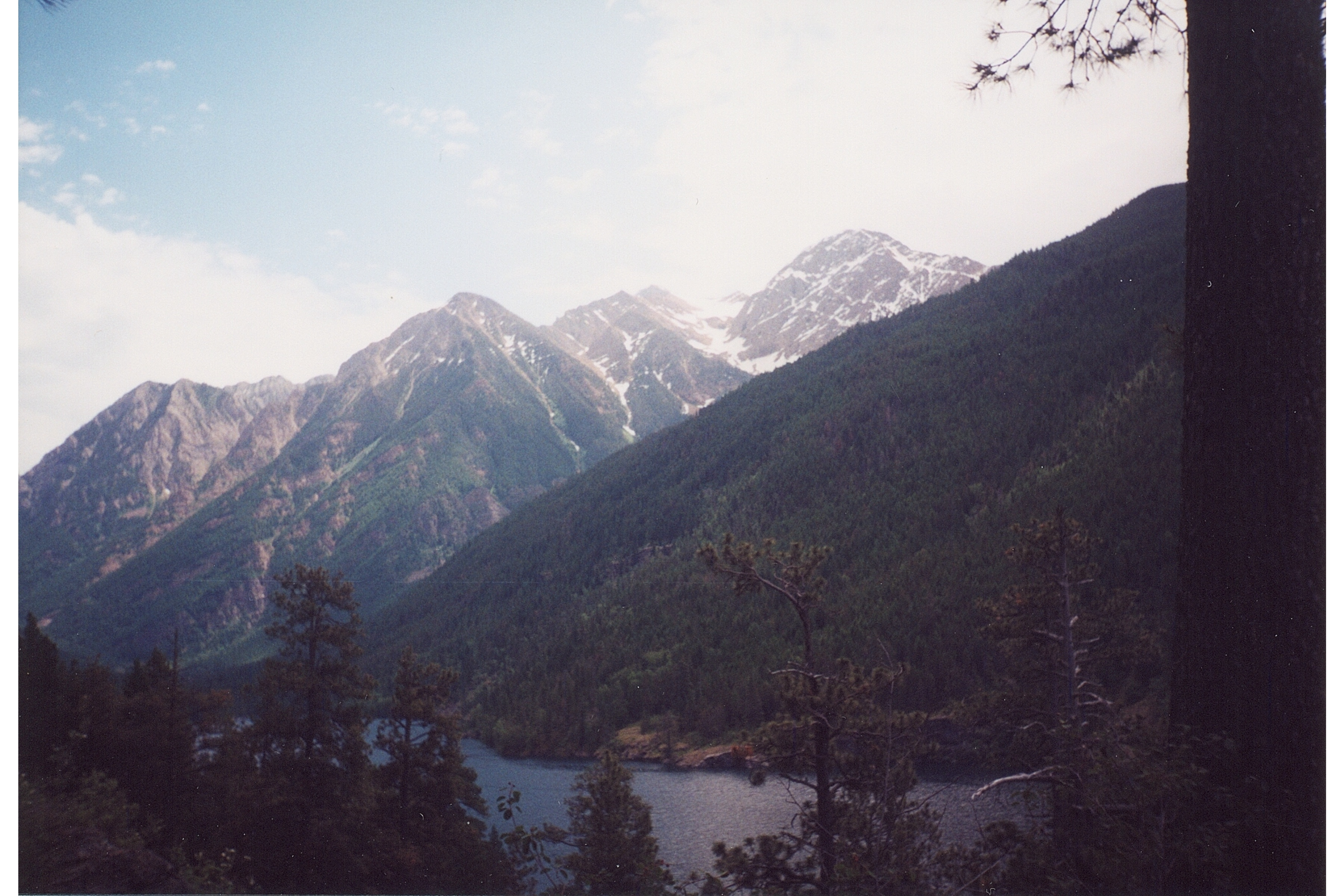
McDonald Peak

== See also ==
- List of mountain peaks of North America
  - List of mountain peaks of Greenland
  - List of mountain peaks of Canada
  - List of mountain peaks of the Rocky Mountains
  - List of mountain peaks of the United States
    - List of mountain peaks of Alaska
    - List of mountain peaks of Arizona
    - List of mountain peaks of California
    - List of mountain peaks of Colorado
    - List of mountain peaks of Hawaiʻi
    - List of mountain peaks of Idaho
    - List of mountain peaks of Montana
      - List of mountains of Montana
      - List of mountain ranges of Montana
    - List of mountain peaks of Nevada
    - List of mountain peaks of New Mexico
    - List of mountain peaks of Oregon
    - List of mountain peaks of Utah
    - List of mountain peaks of Washington (state)
    - List of mountain peaks of Wyoming
  - List of mountain peaks of México
  - List of mountain peaks of Central America
  - List of mountain peaks of the Caribbean
- Montana
  - Geography of Montana
    - Category:Mountains of Montana
      - commons:Category:Mountains of Montana
- Physical geography
  - Topography
    - Topographic elevation
    - Topographic prominence
    - Topographic isolation
