= Miller Peak =

Miller Peak may refer to:

- Miller Peak (Arizona), in the Huachuca Mountains, Arizona
- Miller Peak (Explorers Range), in Explorers Range, Antarctica
- Miller Peak (Sentinel Range), in Sentinel Range, Antarctica
- Miller Peak (Montana), mountain in Missoula County, Montana
