= Mount Wood (Montana) =

Mountain in Montana, United States

- Location within Montana Location within the United States

Highest point
- Elevation: 12,660 ft (3,860 m)
- Prominence: 2,860 ft (870 m)
- Coordinates: 45°16′31″N 109°48′48″W

Geography
- Location: Stillwater County, Montana, U.S.
- Parent range: Beartooth Range
- Topo map: USGS Mount Wood MT

Mount Wood (12,660 feet (3,859 m)) is the highest summit in the Granite Range, a subrange of the Beartooth Mountains in the U.S. state of Montana. It is located within the Custer National Forest.

== Climate ==
Climate data for Mount Wood (MT) 45.2746 N, 109.8095 W, Elevation: 12,103 ft (3,689 m) (1991–2020 normals)
Month	Jan	Feb	Mar	Apr	May	Jun	Jul	Aug	Sep	Oct	Nov	Dec	Year
Mean daily maximum °F (°C)	18.1 (−7.7)	17.1 (−8.3)	21.8 (−5.7)	26.8 (−2.9)	36.4 (2.4)	46.9 (8.3)	57.6 (14.2)	57.0 (13.9)	48.0 (8.9)	35.1 (1.7)	23.2 (−4.9)	17.3 (−8.2)	33.8 (1.0)
Daily mean °F (°C)	8.8 (−12.9)	7.0 (−13.9)	11.2 (−11.6)	15.6 (−9.1)	24.4 (−4.2)	34.0 (1.1)	43.2 (6.2)	42.6 (5.9)	34.5 (1.4)	23.4 (−4.8)	14.0 (−10.0)	8.3 (−13.2)	22.3 (−5.4)
Mean daily minimum °F (°C)	−0.5 (−18.1)	−3.1 (−19.5)	0.5 (−17.5)	4.3 (−15.4)	12.5 (−10.8)	21.0 (−6.1)	28.7 (−1.8)	28.3 (−2.1)	21.0 (−6.1)	11.7 (−11.3)	4.9 (−15.1)	−0.6 (−18.1)	10.7 (−11.8)
Average precipitation inches (mm)	4.35 (110)	4.36 (111)	4.52 (115)	4.24 (108)	5.61 (142)	3.73 (95)	4.01 (102)	3.06 (78)	3.59 (91)	4.15 (105)	4.63 (118)	5.10 (130)	51.35 (1,305)
Source: PRISM Climate Group
