= List of mountains in Missoula County, Montana =

There are at least 98 named mountains in Missoula County, Montana.

- Albert Point, 46°56′53″N 114°21′11″W, el. 5,945 feet (1,812 m)
- Baldy, 46°57′24″N 113°20′09″W, el. 5,085 feet (1,550 m)
- Baldy Mountain, 46°42′27″N 113°58′53″W, el. 5,978 feet (1,822 m)
- Bata Mountain, 46°56′09″N 113°18′46″W, el. 5,850 feet (1,780 m)
- Beavertail Hill, 46°43′16″N 113°35′11″W, el. 4,078 feet (1,243 m)
- Belmont Point, 47°03′49″N 113°36′08″W, el. 6,657 feet (2,029 m)
- Black Mountain, 46°52′12″N 114°12′21″W, el. 5,863 feet (1,787 m)
- Black Mountain, 47°02′51″N 113°40′31″W, el. 6,919 feet (2,109 m)
- Blacktail Peak, 47°16′18″N 113°50′06″W, el. 7,999 feet (2,438 m)
- Blue Mountain, 46°48′57″N 114°11′10″W, el. 6,437 feet (1,962 m)
- Blue Point, 46°56′18″N 113°51′23″W, el. 6,798 feet (2,072 m)
- Boles Point, 47°06′47″N 113°40′34″W, el. 6,368 feet (1,941 m)
- Bonner Mountain, 46°51′50″N 113°47′47″W, el. 6,808 feet (2,075 m)
- Boulder Point, 47°04′08″N 113°50′07″W, el. 7,293 feet (2,223 m)
- Boyd Mountain, 47°03′47″N 113°22′36″W, el. 4,921 feet (1,500 m)
- Burnt Fork Pinnacle, 47°15′09″N 114°36′42″W, el. 6,624 feet (2,019 m)
- Carmine Peak, 47°26′34″N 113°32′24″W, el. 8,474 feet (2,583 m)
- Cayuse Hill, 47°01′49″N 114°22′18″W, el. 3,658 feet (1,115 m)
- Charity Peak, 47°04′47″N 114°07′38″W, el. 6,535 feet (1,992 m)
- Ch-paa-qn Peak, 47°09′28″N 114°21′21″W, el. 7,989 feet (2,435 m)
- Cooney Mountain, 47°34′45″N 113°37′12″W, el. 8,671 feet (2,643 m)
- Council Hill, 46°52′17″N 114°06′10″W, el. 3,291 feet (1,003 m)
- Daughter of the Sun Mountain, 47°20′41″N 113°50′59″W, el. 8,668 feet (2,642 m)
- Davis Point, 46°43′01″N 113°56′44″W, el. 5,623 feet (1,714 m)
- Diamond Mountain, 46°54′03″N 113°40′21″W, el. 4,304 feet (1,312 m)
- Diamond Point, 46°53′29″N 114°18′17″W, el. 4,977 feet (1,517 m)
- Edith Peak, 47°07′15″N 114°15′14″W, el. 6,768 feet (2,063 m)
- Elk Creek Point, 47°29′57″N 113°48′28″W, el. 4,849 feet (1,478 m)
- Elk Mountain, 46°44′08″N 113°47′06″W, el. 6,115 feet (1,864 m)
- Ellis Mountain, 47°02′02″N 114°27′08″W, el. 5,932 feet (1,808 m)
- Fawn Peak, 47°11′00″N 113°37′43″W, el. 5,689 feet (1,734 m)
- Fisher Peak, 47°21′54″N 113°29′44″W, el. 8,819 feet (2,688 m)
- Ginny Mountain, 46°49′58″N 113°56′55″W, el. 4,695 feet (1,431 m)
- Goat Mountain, 47°19′42″N 113°51′54″W, el. 8,169 feet (2,490 m)
- Gold Creek Peak, 47°04′01″N 113°41′57″W, el. 7,214 feet (2,199 m)
- Gyp Mountain, 47°31′59″N 113°29′55″W, el. 7,989 feet (2,435 m)
- Hemlock Point, 47°27′31″N 113°50′30″W, el. 7,766 feet (2,367 m)
- Holland Peak, 47°32′06″N 113°34′56″W, el. 9,308 feet (2,837 m)
- Horsehead Peak, 47°10′16″N 114°39′00″W, el. 6,693 feet (2,040 m)
- Iris Point, 46°42′39″N 113°44′22″W, el. 6,421 feet (1,957 m)
- Lindy Peak, 47°21′15″N 113°49′22″W, el. 8,353 feet (2,546 m)
- Little Belmont Point, 46°58′37″N 113°36′46″W, el. 5,256 feet (1,602 m)
- Little Carmine Peak, 47°26′52″N 113°31′42″W, el. 7,867 feet (2,398 m)
- Lockwood Point, 46°54′59″N 113°46′40″W, el. 6,663 feet (2,031 m)
- Lolo Peak, 46°40′29″N 114°14′40″W, el. 9,140 feet (2,790 m)
- Lost Mountain, 47°19′25″N 113°51′33″W, el. 8,146 feet (2,483 m)
- Martin Point, 46°57′31″N 114°29′19″W, el. 6,017 feet (1,834 m)
- McCauley Butte, 46°50′28″N 114°05′12″W, el. 3,438 feet (1,048 m)
- McLeod Peak, 47°05′43″N 113°55′22″W, el. 8,632 feet (2,631 m)
- Miller Peak, 46°45′27″N 113°53′14″W, el. 7,027 feet (2,142 m)
- Mineral Peak, 47°00′13″N 113°48′46″W, el. 7,451 feet (2,271 m)
- Mitten Mountain, 46°48′07″N 113°57′06″W, el. 6,007 feet (1,831 m)
- Mormon Peak, 46°43′22″N 114°10′52″W, el. 6,047 feet (1,843 m)
- Morrison Peak, 46°55′30″N 113°32′58″W, el. 5,627 feet (1,715 m)
- Mosquito Peak, 47°02′28″N 113°55′58″W, el. 8,018 feet (2,444 m)
- Mount Dean Stone, 46°48′08″N 113°58′22″W, el. 6,204 feet (1,891 m)
- Mount Henry, 47°15′14″N 113°41′38″W, el. 7,096 feet (2,163 m)
- Mount Jumbo, 46°52′45″N 113°57′23″W, el. 4,764 feet (1,452 m)
- Mount Sentinel, 46°51′09″N 113°57′48″W, el. 5,131 feet (1,564 m)
- Mount Shoemaker, 47°21′02″N 113°52′46″W, el. 7,940 feet (2,420 m)
- Murphy Peak, 47°03′26″N 113°58′29″W, el. 8,163 feet (2,488 m)
- North Jocko Peak, 47°16′28″N 113°48′43″W, el. 7,700 feet (2,300 m)
- Olson Peak, 46°52′06″N 113°44′49″W, el. 6,214 feet (1,894 m)
- Petty Mountain, 46°54′41″N 114°24′20″W, el. 7,257 feet (2,212 m)
- Pilot Knob, 46°43′35″N 114°38′47″W, el. 7,231 feet (2,204 m)
- Point Saint Charles, 47°22′05″N 113°51′53″W, el. 8,330 feet (2,540 m)
- Point Six, 47°02′28″N 113°59′10″W, el. 7,940 feet (2,420 m)
- Ptarmigan Mountain, 47°24′41″N 113°31′15″W, el. 8,599 feet (2,621 m)
- Red Butte, 47°24′08″N 113°49′46″W, el. 7,654 feet (2,333 m)
- Richmond Peak, 47°19′24″N 113°30′00″W, el. 7,113 feet (2,168 m)
- Rocky Peak, 46°42′44″N 114°37′29″W, el. 6,680 feet (2,040 m)
- Rocky Point, 46°39′39″N 114°19′57″W, el. 7,775 feet (2,370 m)
- Sheep Mountain, 46°56′52″N 113°48′24″W, el. 7,651 feet (2,332 m)
- Skookum Butte, 46°39′53″N 114°23′42″W, el. 7,234 feet (2,205 m)
- Stuart Peak, 47°00′24″N 113°55′11″W, el. 7,867 feet (2,398 m)
- Sugarloaf Mountain, 47°19′31″N 113°50′56″W, el. 7,982 feet (2,433 m)
- Sunday Mountain, 47°20′57″N 113°28′58″W, el. 8,123 feet (2,476 m)
- Sunflower Mountain, 46°58′18″N 113°39′30″W, el. 5,673 feet (1,729 m)
- Sunset Crags, 47°17′47″N 113°49′51″W, el. 8,202 feet (2,500 m)
- Sunset Hill, 46°55′37″N 113°24′10″W, el. 3,875 feet (1,181 m)
- Sunset Peak, 47°18′16″N 113°50′20″W, el. 8,291 feet (2,527 m)
- Sunset Peak, 47°19′11″N 113°41′37″W, el. 7,142 feet (2,177 m)
- Tango Point, 47°32′01″N 113°33′16″W, el. 7,657 feet (2,334 m)
- Telephone Butte, 46°51′06″N 114°20′45″W, el. 6,883 feet (2,098 m)
- Three Summit Peak, 47°17′44″N 113°52′10″W, el. 7,972 feet (2,430 m)
- Triangle Peak, 47°05′36″N 113°52′28″W, el. 7,792 feet (2,375 m)
- TV Mountain, 47°01′03″N 114°00′50″W, el. 6,821 feet (2,079 m)
- University Mountain, 46°51′08″N 113°56′07″W, el. 5,705 feet (1,739 m)
- Wagon Mountain, 46°39′37″N 114°33′55″W, el. 5,728 feet (1,746 m)
- Waldbillig Mountain, 47°28′08″N 113°30′39″W, el. 8,212 feet (2,503 m)
- Waterworks Hill, 46°52′31″N 113°59′04″W, el. 3,402 feet (1,037 m)
- Weather Peak, 47°16′41″N 113°50′48″W, el. 8,179 feet (2,493 m)
- West Fork Butte, 46°44′09″N 114°24′56″W, el. 6,145 feet (1,873 m)
- West Fork Point, 47°18′18″N 113°39′33″W, el. 6,243 feet (1,903 m)
- Wild Horse Point, 46°55′38″N 114°19′15″W, el. 5,800 feet (1,800 m)
- Wishard Peak, 47°17′35″N 115°30′32″W, el. 6,368 feet (1,941 m)
- Wolverine Peak, 47°25′36″N 113°32′10″W, el. 8,770 feet (2,670 m)
- Woody Mountain, 46°54′02″N 113°52′33″W, el. 6,201 feet (1,890 m)

== See also ==
- List of mountains in Montana
- List of mountain ranges in Montana
