= Cutoff Mountain =

Mountain in Montana, United States

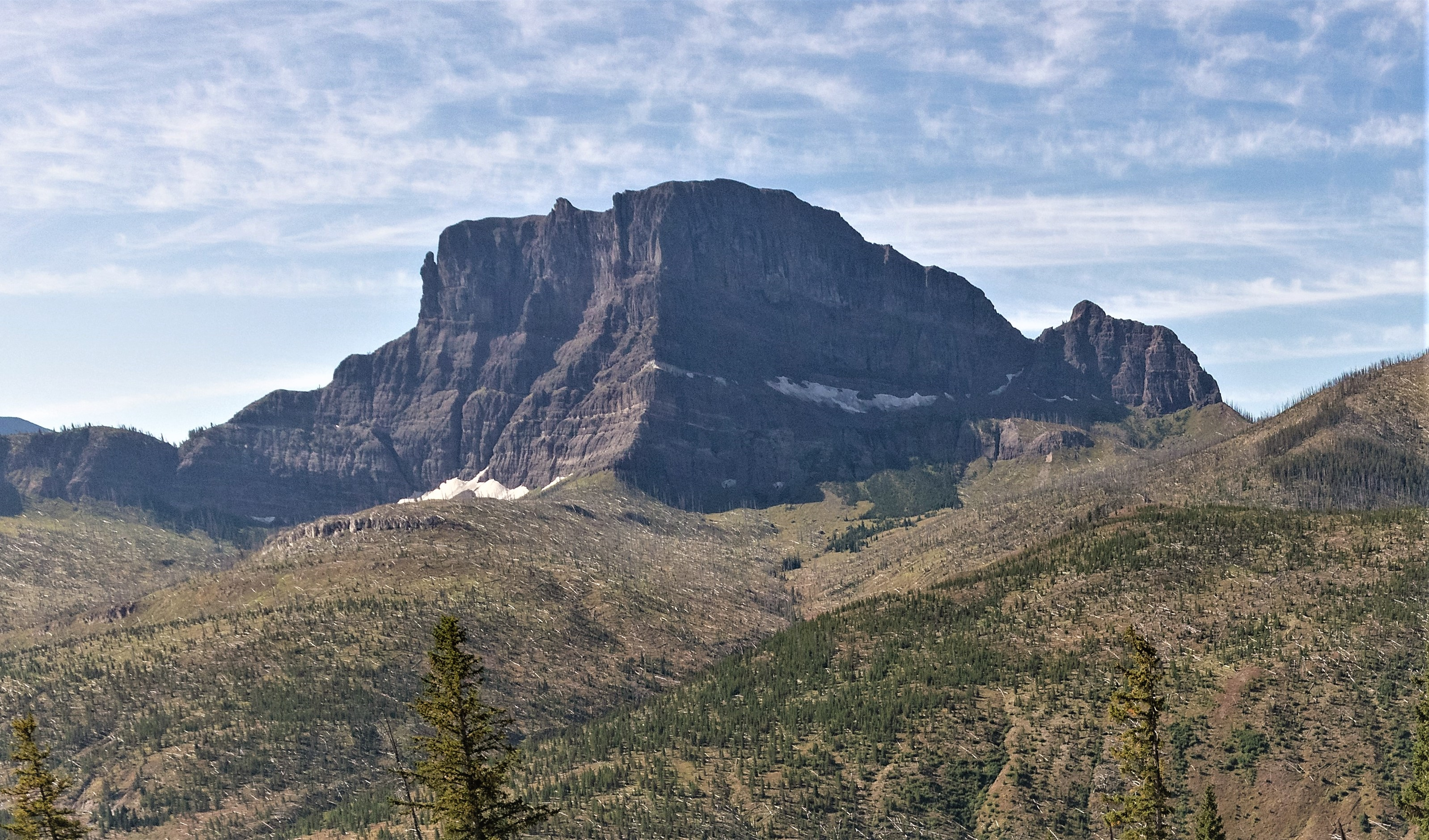
- North aspect

Highest point
- Elevation: 10,695 ft (3,260 m)
- Prominence: 1,735 ft (529 m)
- Parent peak: Abiathar Peak (10,928 ft)
- Isolation: 5.66 mi (9.11 km)
- Listing: Mountain peaks of Montana
- Coordinates: 45°01′55″N 110°06′56″W

Geography
- Location within Montana Location within the United States
- Country: United States
- State: Montana
- County: Park
- Protected area: Absaroka-Beartooth Wilderness
- Parent range: Absaroka Range
- Topo map: USGS Cutoff Mountain

Geology
- Rock age: Eocene
- Rock type: breccia

Climbing
- Easiest route: class 3 scrambling

Cutoff Mountain is a 10,695-foot (3,260-metre) mountain summit located in Park County, Montana.

== Description ==
Cutoff Mountain is located in the Absaroka Range, which is a subset of the Rocky Mountains. It is situated in the Absaroka-Beartooth Wilderness, along the Yellowstone National Park boundary, on land managed by Gallatin National Forest. Precipitation runoff from the mountain drains into tributaries of the Lamar River, which in turn is a tributary of the Yellowstone River. Topographic relief is significant as the southeast aspect rises 2,800 feet (850 meters) above Pebble Creek in 1.5 mile. This geographical feature was originally named Cutoff Peak in 1929, and the Cutoff Mountain name was officially adopted in 1969 by the United States Board on Geographic Names.

== Climate ==
Based on the Köppen climate classification, Cutoff Mountain is located in a subarctic climate zone characterized by long, usually very cold winters, and mild summers. Winter temperatures can drop below −10 °F with wind chill factors below −30 °F.

== Gallery ==
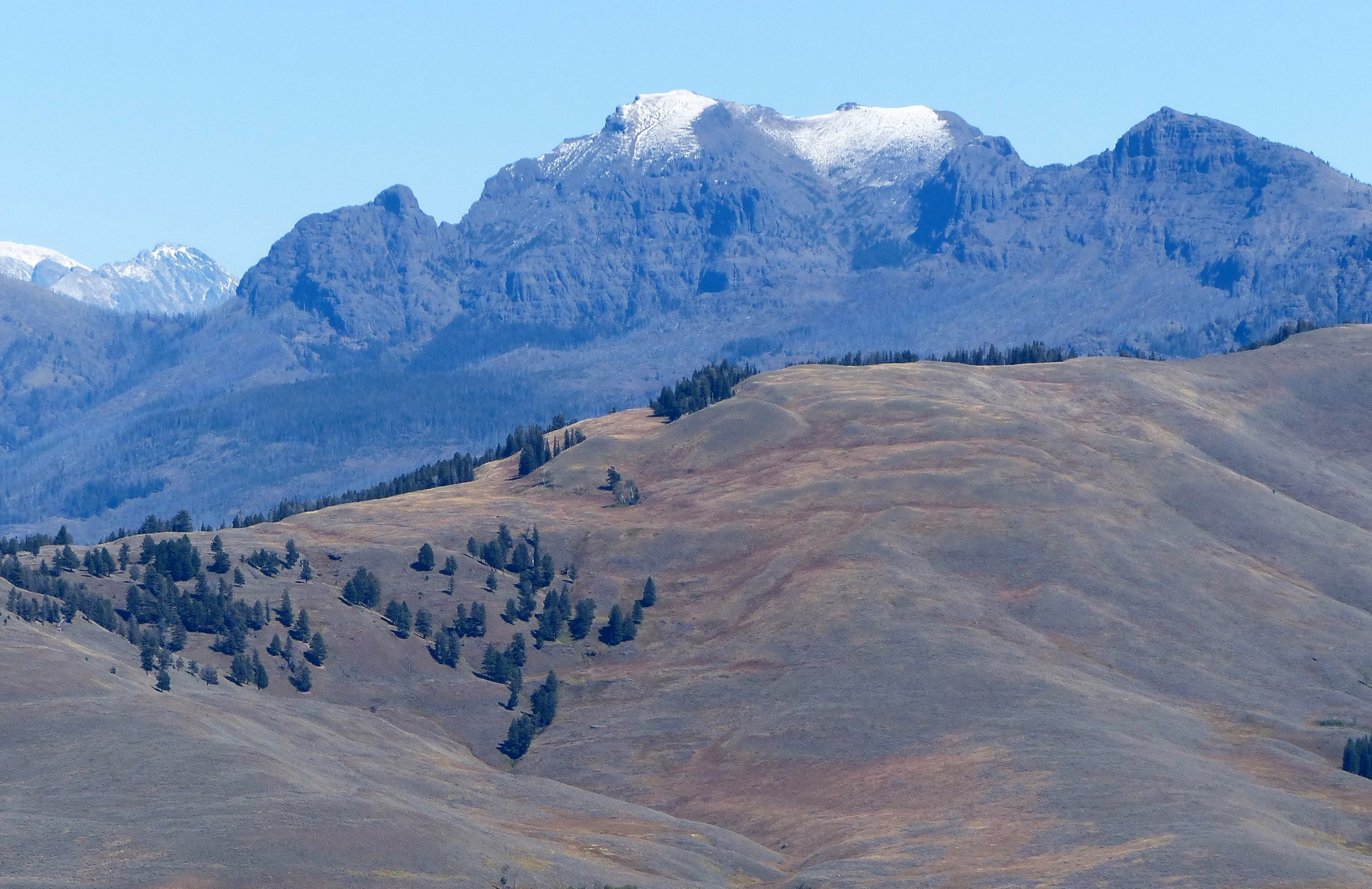
Southwest aspect

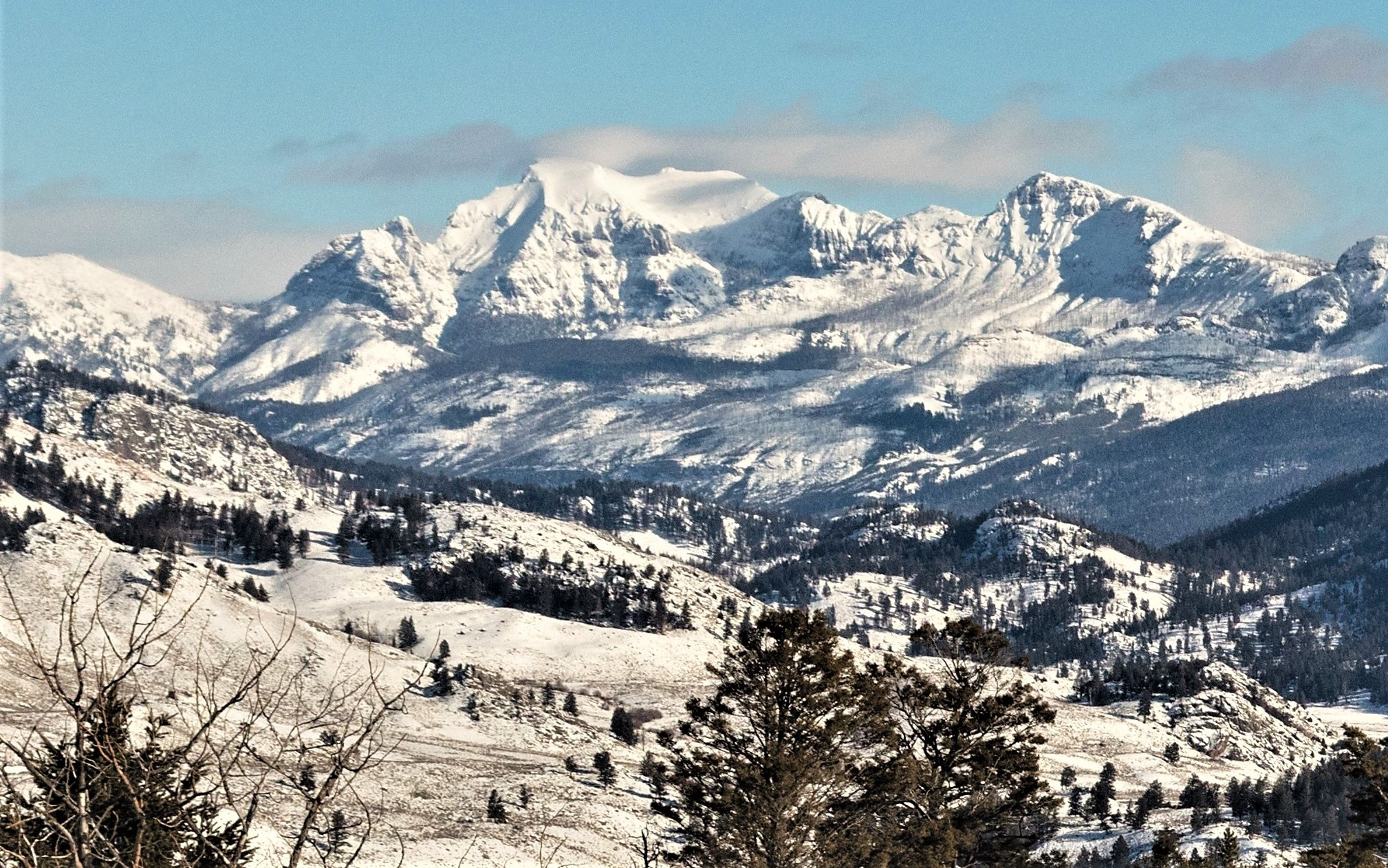
Southwest aspect in winter

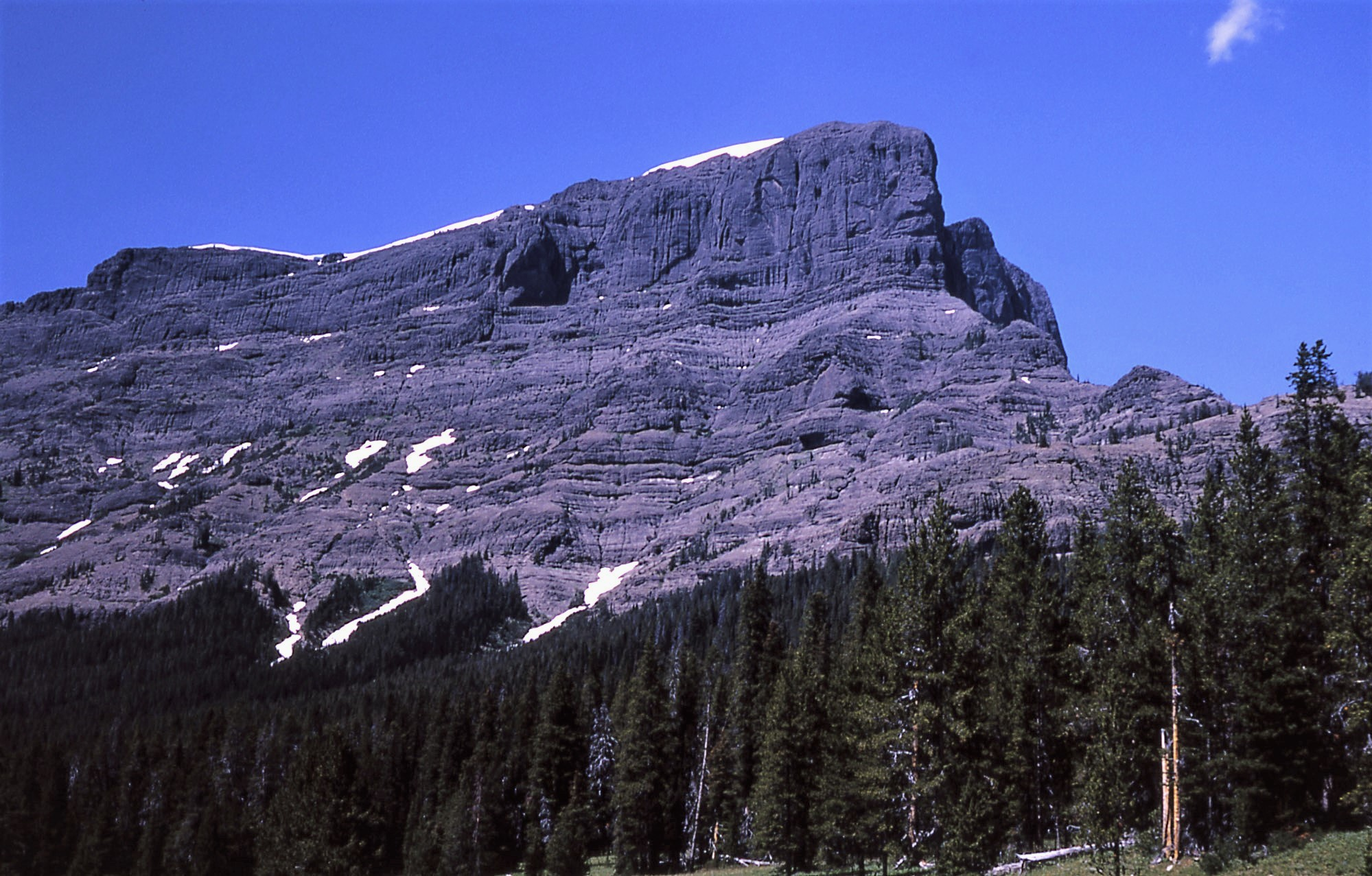
Southeast aspect from Pebble Creek

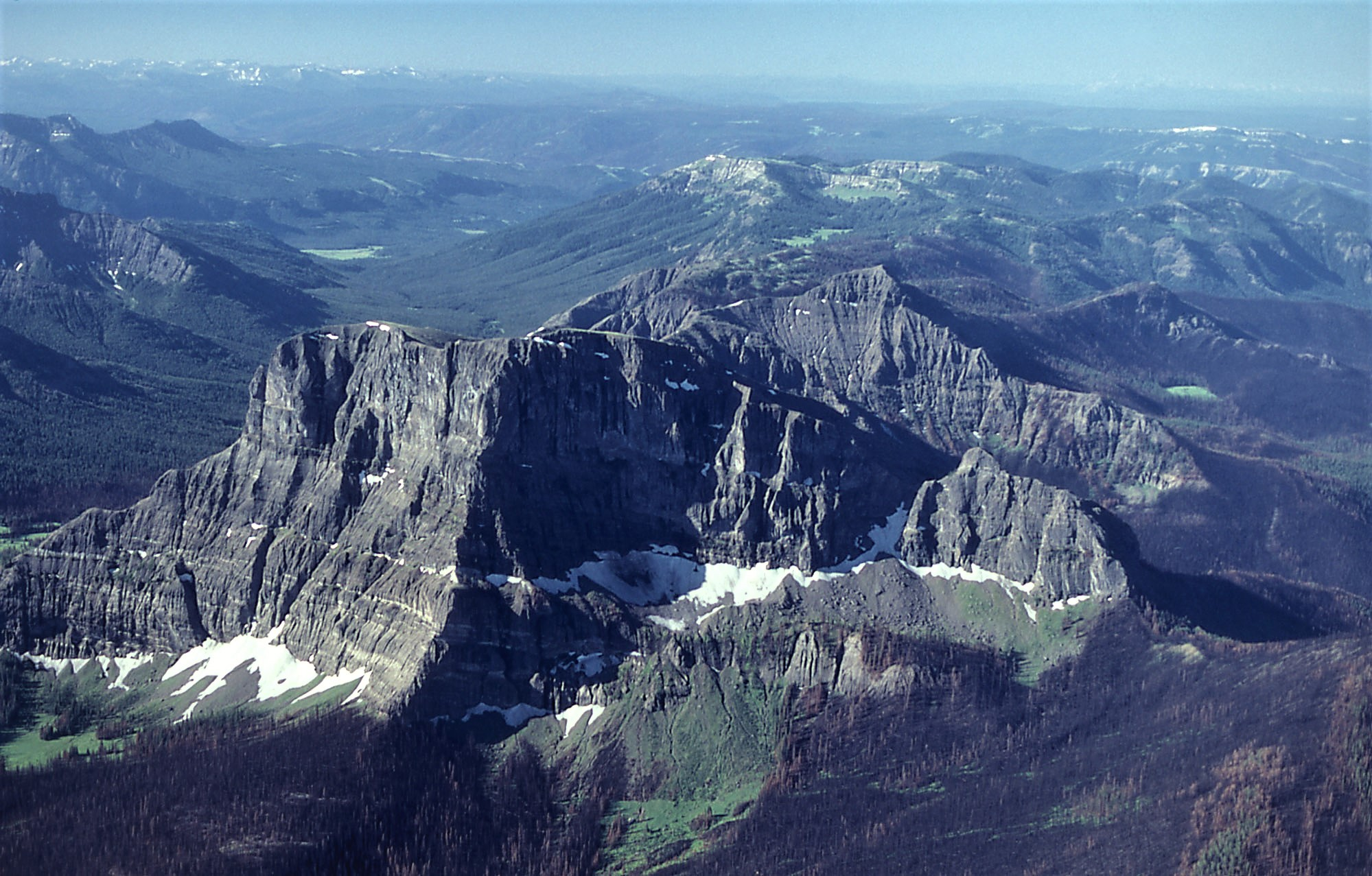
Aerial view of Cutoff Mountain, looking southwest

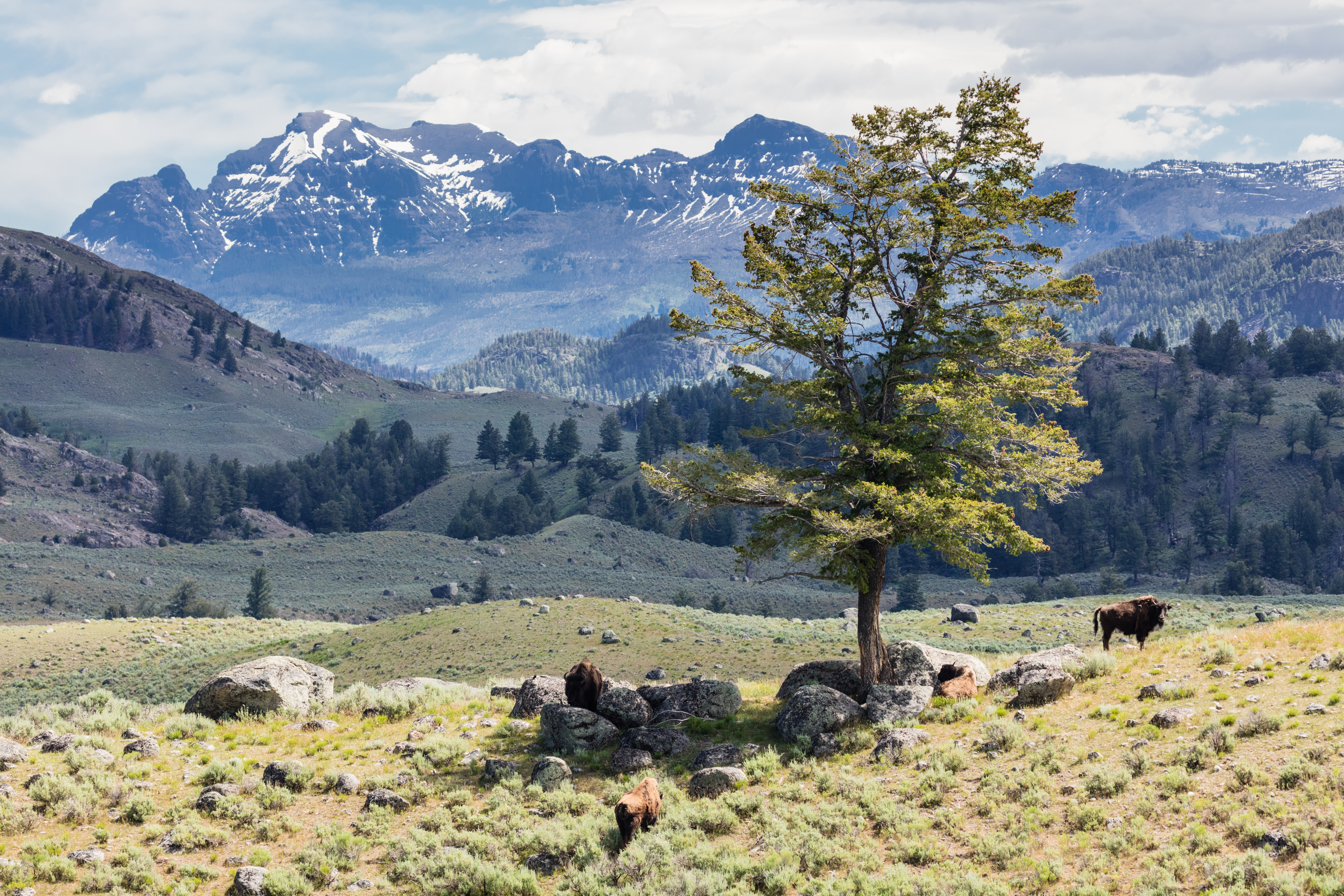

== See also ==
- Geology of the Rocky Mountains
- Mountains and mountain ranges of Yellowstone National Park
