= Fan Mountain =

Mountain in Montana, USA

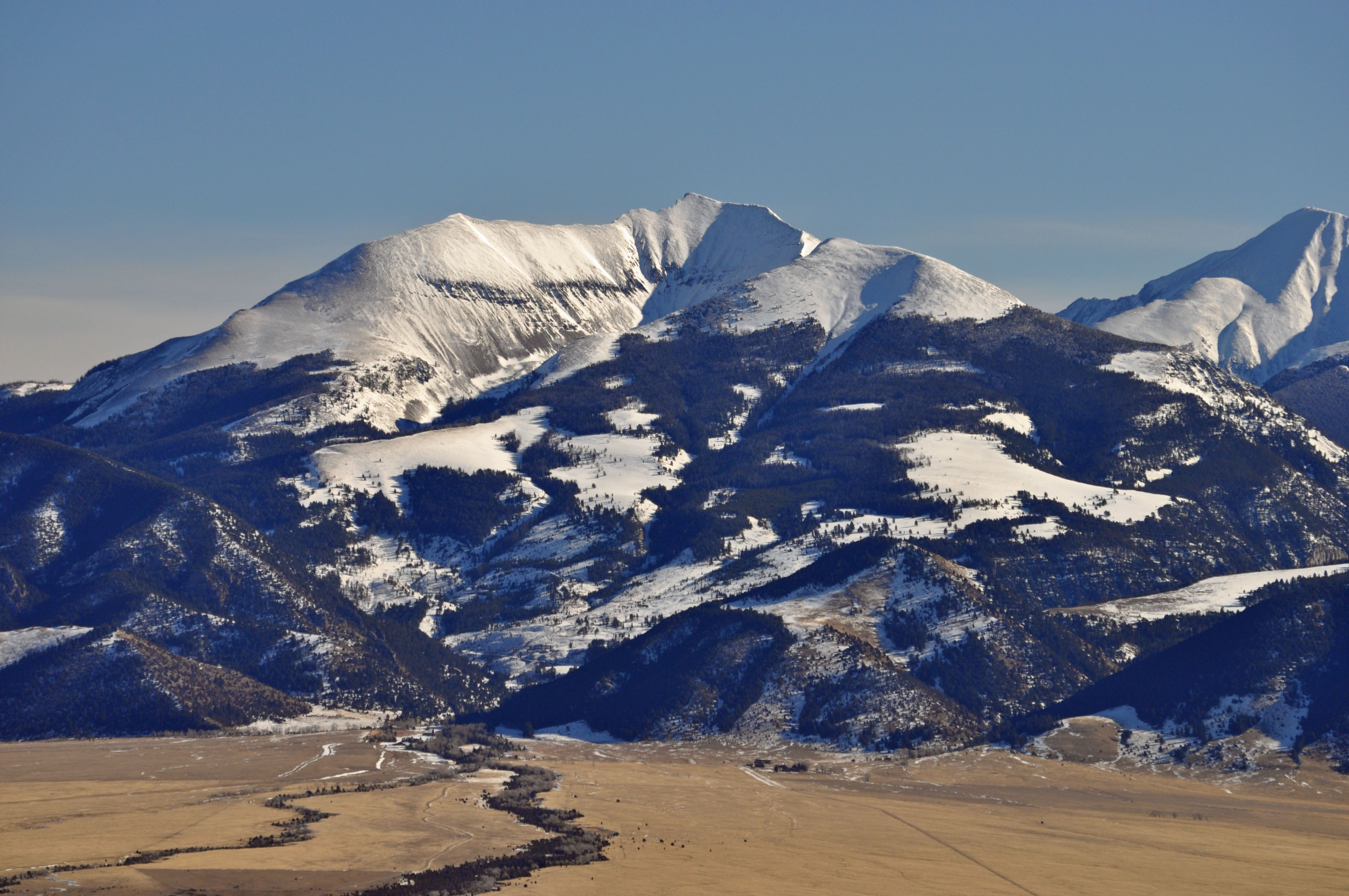
- As seen from Madison River Valley

Highest point
- Elevation: 10,312 ft (3,143 m) NAVD 88
- Prominence: 2,667 ft (813 m)
- Coordinates: 45°17′53″N 111°31′12″W

Geography
- Location within Montana
- Location: Madison County, Montana, U.S.
- Parent range: madison Range
- Topo map(s): USGS Fan Mountain, MT

Geology
- Mountain type: Laccolith

Climbing
- First ascent: Unknown
- Easiest route: Scramble

Fan Mountain is a prominent peak in the Madison Range in Madison County, Montana in the Beaverhead National Forest. The peak is located along the western face of the Madison Range at the northern end of the range. It is due east of Ennis Lake and its prominence and isolation makes it easy to distinguish from Ennis in the Madison River valley.

Jack and Cedar creeks are tributaries of the Madison River with headwaters on the eastern and western face of Fan Mountain. The mountain straddles the northern boundary of the Spanish Peaks parcel of the Lee Metcalf Wilderness area.

== Geology ==
Fan Mountain is a laccolith, a volcanic landform that is formed when magma pushes to the surface but does not flow out. It is similar to the nearby Lone Mountain, another laccolith that was formed the same way.

== See also ==
- Mountains of Madison County, Montana
