= Tumble Mountain =

Mountain in the state of Montana

- Location within Montana Location within the United States

Highest point
- Elevation: 11,319 ft (3,450 m)
- Prominence: 2,488 ft (758 m)
- Coordinates: 45°19′21″N 110°01′34″W

Geography
- Location: Stillwater County, Montana, U.S.
- Parent range: Absaroka Range
- Topo map: USGS Tumble Mountain

Climbing
- Easiest route: Hike

Tumble Mountain (11,319 feet (3,450 m)) is in the Absaroka Range in the U.S. state of Montana. The peak is located in Custer National Forest. The tiny glacieret Tumble Glacier lies to the northeast.

== Climate ==
Climate data for Tumble Mountain 45.3255 N, 110.0247 W, Elevation: 10,928 ft (3,331 m) (1991–2020 normals)
Month	Jan	Feb	Mar	Apr	May	Jun	Jul	Aug	Sep	Oct	Nov	Dec	Year
Mean daily maximum °F (°C)	21.4 (−5.9)	20.7 (−6.3)	25.8 (−3.4)	31.5 (−0.3)	40.8 (4.9)	50.9 (10.5)	61.5 (16.4)	60.9 (16.1)	51.6 (10.9)	38.3 (3.5)	26.5 (−3.1)	20.5 (−6.4)	37.5 (3.1)
Daily mean °F (°C)	12.3 (−10.9)	10.8 (−11.8)	15.2 (−9.3)	20.1 (−6.6)	29.0 (−1.7)	38.2 (3.4)	47.5 (8.6)	47.0 (8.3)	38.5 (3.6)	27.0 (−2.8)	17.9 (−7.8)	11.8 (−11.2)	26.3 (−3.2)
Mean daily minimum °F (°C)	3.3 (−15.9)	0.9 (−17.3)	4.7 (−15.2)	8.7 (−12.9)	17.2 (−8.2)	25.6 (−3.6)	33.5 (0.8)	33.1 (0.6)	25.4 (−3.7)	15.7 (−9.1)	8.7 (−12.9)	3.0 (−16.1)	15.0 (−9.5)
Average precipitation inches (mm)	3.39 (86)	3.43 (87)	3.69 (94)	4.26 (108)	4.48 (114)	3.60 (91)	3.10 (79)	2.62 (67)	2.64 (67)	3.34 (85)	3.54 (90)	3.58 (91)	41.67 (1,059)
Source: PRISM Climate Group
