= Flint Creek Range =

Mountain range in Granite County, Montana

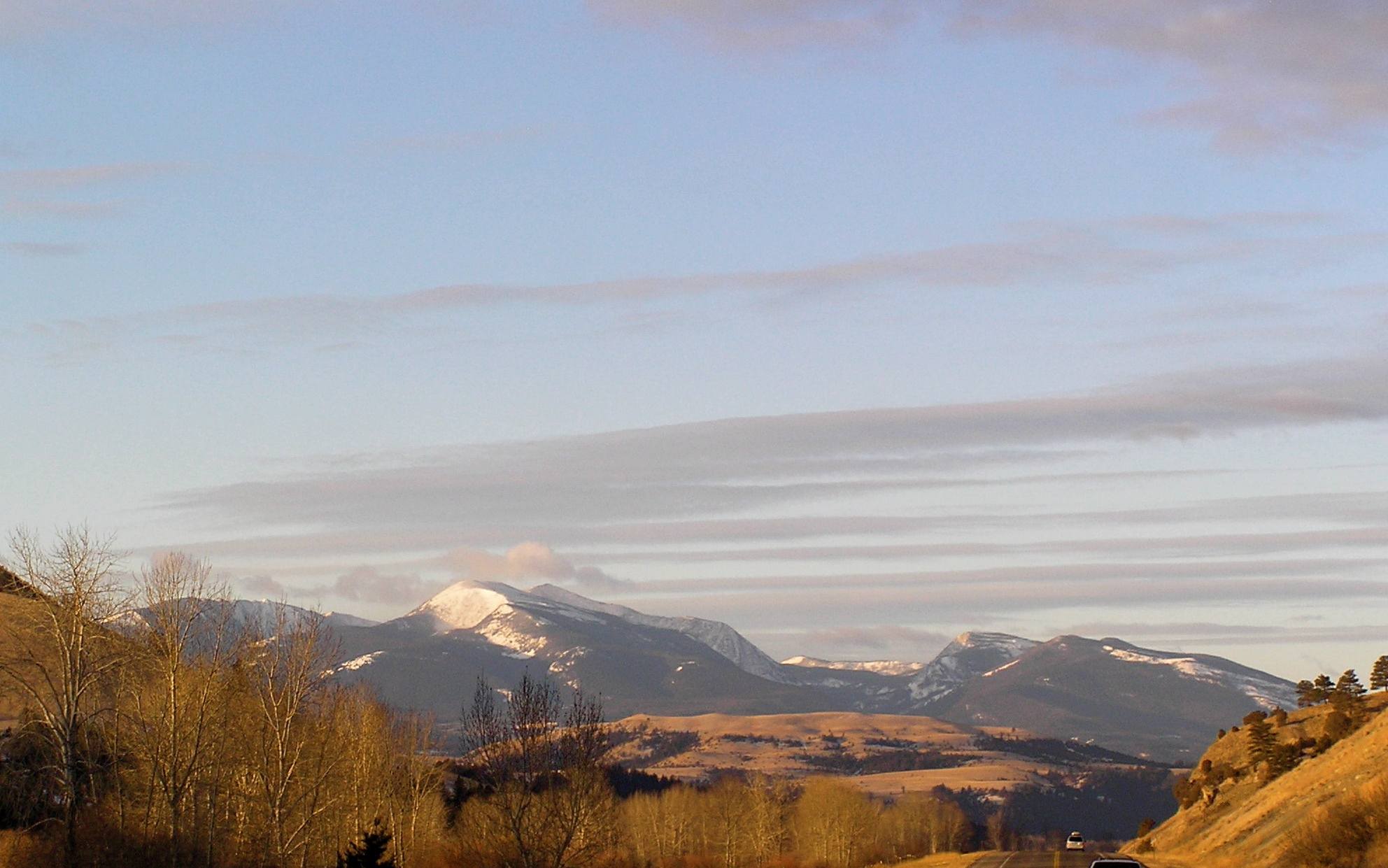
- Flint Creek Range as seen near Garrison, Montana

Highest point
- Peak: Mount Powell
- Elevation: 10,168 ft (3,099 m)
- Coordinates: 46°22′00″N 113°06′33″W

Geography
- Location within Montana
- Country: United States
- State: Montana

The Flint Creek Range, el. 10,168 feet (3,099 m), is a mountain range northeast of Philipsburg, Montana in Granite County, Montana. The highest point in the range is Mount Powell, at 10,168 ft. in elevation.

About 60,000 acres of the Flints are roadless. From Deer Lodge, Montana, there appears to be a level, barren ridge connecting Mount Powell and Deer Lodge Mountain, el. 9765 ft. However, if one is traveling eastbound on Interstate 90, in the stretch between Drummond and Garrison, Montana, looking up one can see that this ridge is actually a sheer cliff called "The Crater." The Crater is characterized as "[g]iant granite ribs resembling the backbone of a dinosaur" by Cunningham. The Flints have the typical Rocky Mountain fauna, including a few mountain goats. The area is popular for hunting of deer, elk, and blue grouse, but otherwise appears to receive little recreational use. Dozens of alpine lakes in the range provide good fishing.

The Discovery Ski Area is located in the southwestern part of the Flints, near Georgetown Lake.

== Climate ==
Climate data for Mount Powell (MT) 46.3488 N, 112.9824 W, Elevation: 9,442 ft (2,878 m) (1991–2020 normals)
Month	Jan	Feb	Mar	Apr	May	Jun	Jul	Aug	Sep	Oct	Nov	Dec	Year
Mean daily maximum °F (°C)	22.6 (−5.2)	22.7 (−5.2)	27.8 (−2.3)	33.1 (0.6)	42.4 (5.8)	51.0 (10.6)	62.2 (16.8)	62.1 (16.7)	52.8 (11.6)	38.9 (3.8)	26.9 (−2.8)	21.4 (−5.9)	38.7 (3.7)
Daily mean °F (°C)	15.5 (−9.2)	14.3 (−9.8)	18.3 (−7.6)	23.1 (−4.9)	31.9 (−0.1)	39.7 (4.3)	49.5 (9.7)	49.4 (9.7)	41.0 (5.0)	29.5 (−1.4)	20.0 (−6.7)	14.6 (−9.7)	28.9 (−1.7)
Mean daily minimum °F (°C)	8.4 (−13.1)	5.9 (−14.5)	8.8 (−12.9)	13.1 (−10.5)	21.3 (−5.9)	28.5 (−1.9)	36.8 (2.7)	36.7 (2.6)	29.3 (−1.5)	20.1 (−6.6)	13.1 (−10.5)	7.8 (−13.4)	19.2 (−7.1)
Average precipitation inches (mm)	3.39 (86)	3.50 (89)	4.15 (105)	5.21 (132)	5.15 (131)	5.37 (136)	2.10 (53)	2.08 (53)	2.59 (66)	3.19 (81)	3.73 (95)	3.69 (94)	44.15 (1,121)
Source: PRISM Climate Group

== See also ==
- List of mountain ranges in Montana
- Media related to Flint Creek Range at Wikimedia Commons
