= Gallatin Peak =

Mountain in the state of Montana

- Location within Montana Location within the United States

Highest point
- Elevation: 11,015 ft (3,357 m)
- Prominence: 3,197 ft (974 m)
- Coordinates: 45°22′6″N 111°21′57″W

Geography
- Location: Madison County, Montana, U.S.
- Parent range: Madison Range
- Topo map(s): USGS Gallatin Peak, MT

Climbing
- Easiest route: Scramble

Gallatin Peak is a summit located in the Madison Range in the U.S. state of Montana. The summit is located in Lee Metcalf Wilderness within Gallatin and Beaverhead-Deerlodge National Forests.

== See also ==
- Mountains in Madison County, Montana
