= Mount Cowen =

Mountain in Montana, United States

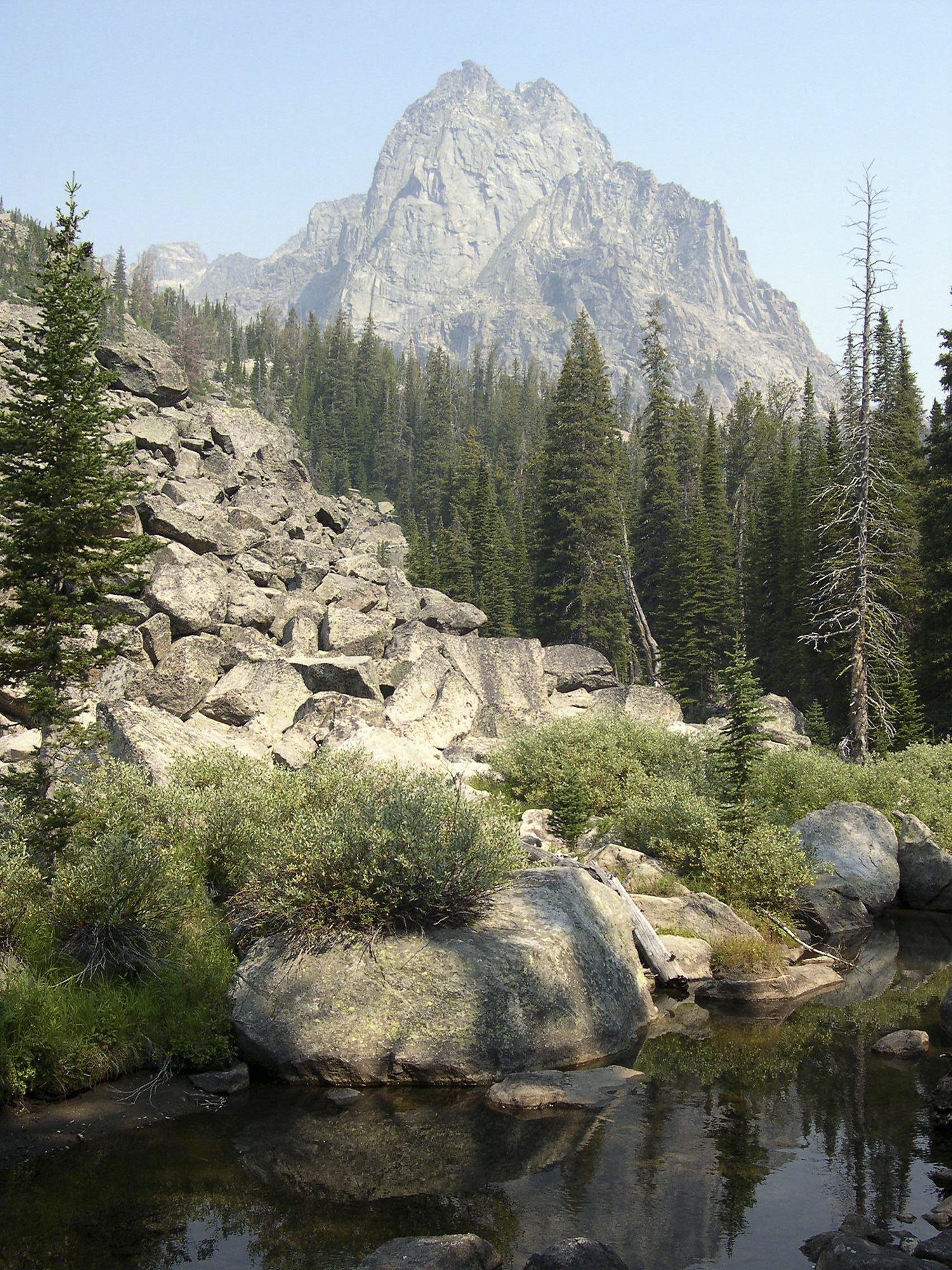
- South aspect

Highest point
- Elevation: 11,217 ft (3,419 m)
- Prominence: 2,652 ft (808 m)
- Listing: Mountains of Montana
- Coordinates: 45°23′21″N 110°29′09″W

Geography
- Location within Montana Location within the United States
- Location: Park County, Montana, U.S.
- Parent range: Absaroka Range
- Topo map: USGS Mount Cowen

Climbing
- Easiest route: Hike

Mount Cowen (11,217 feet (3,419 m)) is in the Absaroka Range in the U.S. state of Montana. The peak is located in Gallatin National Forest. Several small glacierets exist on the flanks of the peak, especially on the northern slopes.
