= Little Belt Mountains =

Section of the Rocky Mountains, United States

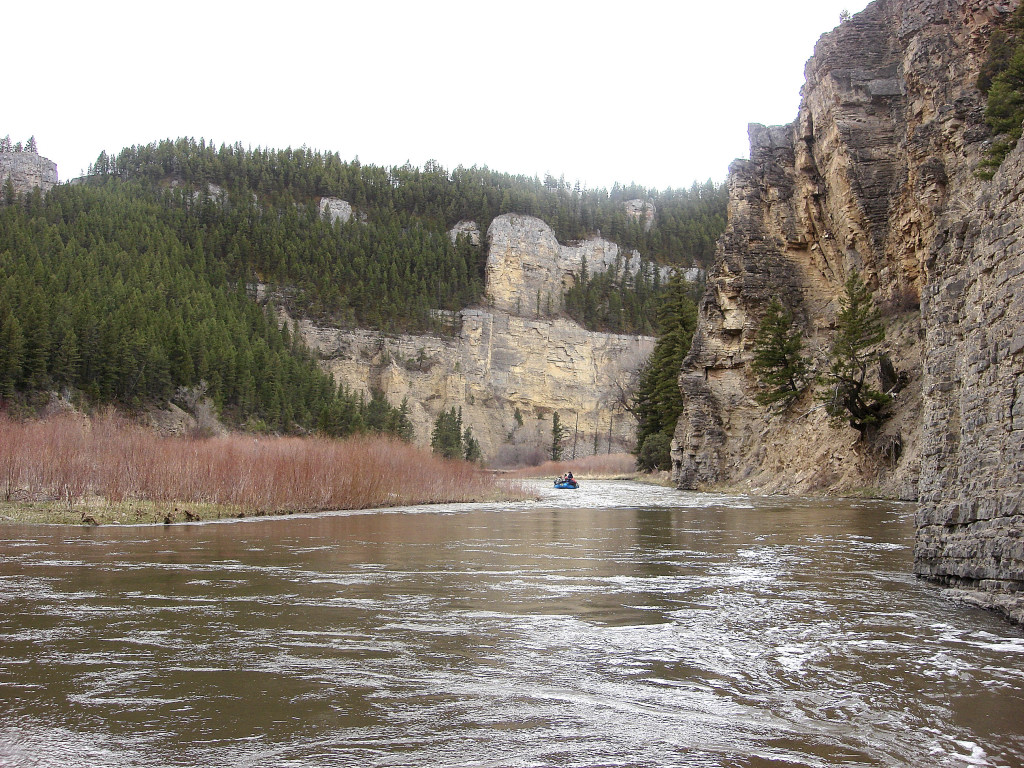
- Early season on the Smith River

Highest point
- Peak: Big Baldy Mountain
- Elevation: 9,175 ft (2,797 m)

Geography
- Country: United States
- Region: Montana
- Range coordinates: 46°45′N 110°24′W
- Parent range: Rocky Mountains

The Little Belt Mountains are a section of the Rocky Mountains in the U.S. state of Montana. Situated mainly in the Lewis and Clark National Forest, the mountains are used for logging and recreation for the residents of Great Falls, Montana. Showdown is a ski area located within the mountains located off US Highway 89 which splits the mountains in half connecting White Sulphur Springs and Belt, MT. The highest point in the Little Belt Range is Big Baldy Mountain at 9,467 feet (2,886 m).

The Little Belts have been mined for silver since the 1880s, and for sapphire since 1896. The sapphires, called Yogo sapphires as they are mined near Yogo Creek, occur in a formation three miles (4.8 km) long and eight feet (2.4 m) across.

The mountains are named for a butte in the range, Belt Butte, itself named for a band of white rock which encircles it.

The Showdown Ski Area holds the state's record for snowfall, 33 feet (10 m) of snow in one winter.

The mountain range of gently rolling peaks and expansive conifer forests contains two large roadless areas. The smaller area, about 92,000 acres (370 km^{2}) in size, is protected as the Middle Fork-Judith Wilderness Study Area. This area includes the Middle and Lost Forks of the Judith River, which cut deep canyons through multicolored limestone cliffs. The Middle Fork-Judith WSA contains over 29 miles of streams containing Yellowstone cutthroat and rainbow trout. Higher elevations are covered in lodgepole pine and whitebark pine, while lower elevations contain ponderosa pine and douglas fir intermixed with grassy parks and meadows. The larger area, encompassing the Tenderfoot Creek drainage, in the western portion of the range, is unprotected and about 108,000 acres (440 km^{2}) in size; it includes some private lands as well as about 98,000 acres (400 km^{2}) of roadless Lewis and Clark National Forest lands. The Smith River Canyon, a popular float trip, is along the western edge of this area.

Ponderosa pine and douglas-fir are the predominant tree species in the Little Belts, and wildlife includes black bear, elk, and white-tailed and mule deer. Reports of grizzly bears have increased since 2017.

== Climate ==
Millegan 14 SE is a weather station in the southwestern Little Belt Mountains near Woods Mountain, 7,533 ft (2,296 m). Millegan has a humid continental climate (Köppen Dfb).

Climate data for Millegan 14 SE, Montana, 1991–2020 normals, 1984-2020 extremes: 4970ft (1515m)
Month	Jan	Feb	Mar	Apr	May	Jun	Jul	Aug	Sep	Oct	Nov	Dec	Year
Record high °F (°C)	59 (15)	67 (19)	71 (22)	80 (27)	86 (30)	96 (36)	98 (37)	96 (36)	92 (33)	86 (30)	70 (21)	60 (16)	98 (37)
Mean maximum °F (°C)	50.4 (10.2)	52.0 (11.1)	60.9 (16.1)	70.5 (21.4)	78.5 (25.8)	85.5 (29.7)	91.6 (33.1)	90.7 (32.6)	86.5 (30.3)	75.4 (24.1)	60.6 (15.9)	49.9 (9.9)	92.7 (33.7)
Mean daily maximum °F (°C)	33.3 (0.7)	35.2 (1.8)	44.1 (6.7)	52.0 (11.1)	61.2 (16.2)	69.8 (21.0)	80.2 (26.8)	79.8 (26.6)	69.3 (20.7)	54.3 (12.4)	41.1 (5.1)	32.1 (0.1)	54.4 (12.4)
Daily mean °F (°C)	22.3 (−5.4)	23.4 (−4.8)	31.9 (−0.1)	39.0 (3.9)	47.6 (8.7)	55.5 (13.1)	63.3 (17.4)	62.2 (16.8)	53.3 (11.8)	41.3 (5.2)	29.8 (−1.2)	21.7 (−5.7)	40.9 (5.0)
Mean daily minimum °F (°C)	10.3 (−12.1)	11.2 (−11.6)	18.1 (−7.7)	25.0 (−3.9)	32.5 (0.3)	39.0 (3.9)	44.4 (6.9)	42.7 (5.9)	35.3 (1.8)	26.4 (−3.1)	18.9 (−7.3)	10.3 (−12.1)	26.2 (−3.3)
Mean minimum °F (°C)	−16.3 (−26.8)	−13.7 (−25.4)	−3.4 (−19.7)	10.2 (−12.1)	21.3 (−5.9)	29.9 (−1.2)	36.6 (2.6)	34.0 (1.1)	24.8 (−4.0)	8.1 (−13.3)	−5.0 (−20.6)	−14.0 (−25.6)	−26.2 (−32.3)
Record low °F (°C)	−37 (−38)	−44 (−42)	−36 (−38)	−7 (−22)	8 (−13)	25 (−4)	30 (−1)	22 (−6)	10 (−12)	−19 (−28)	−24 (−31)	−39 (−39)	−44 (−42)
Average precipitation inches (mm)	1.03 (26)	1.11 (28)	1.14 (29)	2.11 (54)	2.58 (66)	3.61 (92)	1.92 (49)	1.44 (37)	1.36 (35)	1.59 (40)	0.91 (23)	0.82 (21)	19.62 (500)
Average snowfall inches (cm)	23.20 (58.9)	24.40 (62.0)	22.60 (57.4)	22.20 (56.4)	3.40 (8.6)	1.40 (3.6)	0.00 (0.00)	0.00 (0.00)	0.90 (2.3)	7.20 (18.3)	20.30 (51.6)	23.70 (60.2)	149.3 (379.3)
Source 1: NOAA
Source 2: XMACIS2 (records & monthly max/mins)

== See also ==
- List of mountain ranges in Montana
