= Two Sisters (Montana) =

Mountain in Montana, United States

- Location within Montana Location within the United States

Highest point
- Elevation: 11,195 ft (3,412 m)
- Prominence: 1,830 ft (560 m)
- Coordinates: 45°15′48″N 110°01′25″W

Geography
- Location: Stillwater County, Montana, U.S.
- Parent range: Absaroka Range
- Topo map: USGS Tumble Mountain

Climbing
- Easiest route: Hike

Two Sisters (11,195 feet (3,412 m)) is in the Absaroka Range in the U.S. state of Montana. The peak is located in Custer National Forest. Two Sisters consists of an east and west peak with the latter being the taller one.
