= Hilgard Peak =

Mountain in Montana, United States

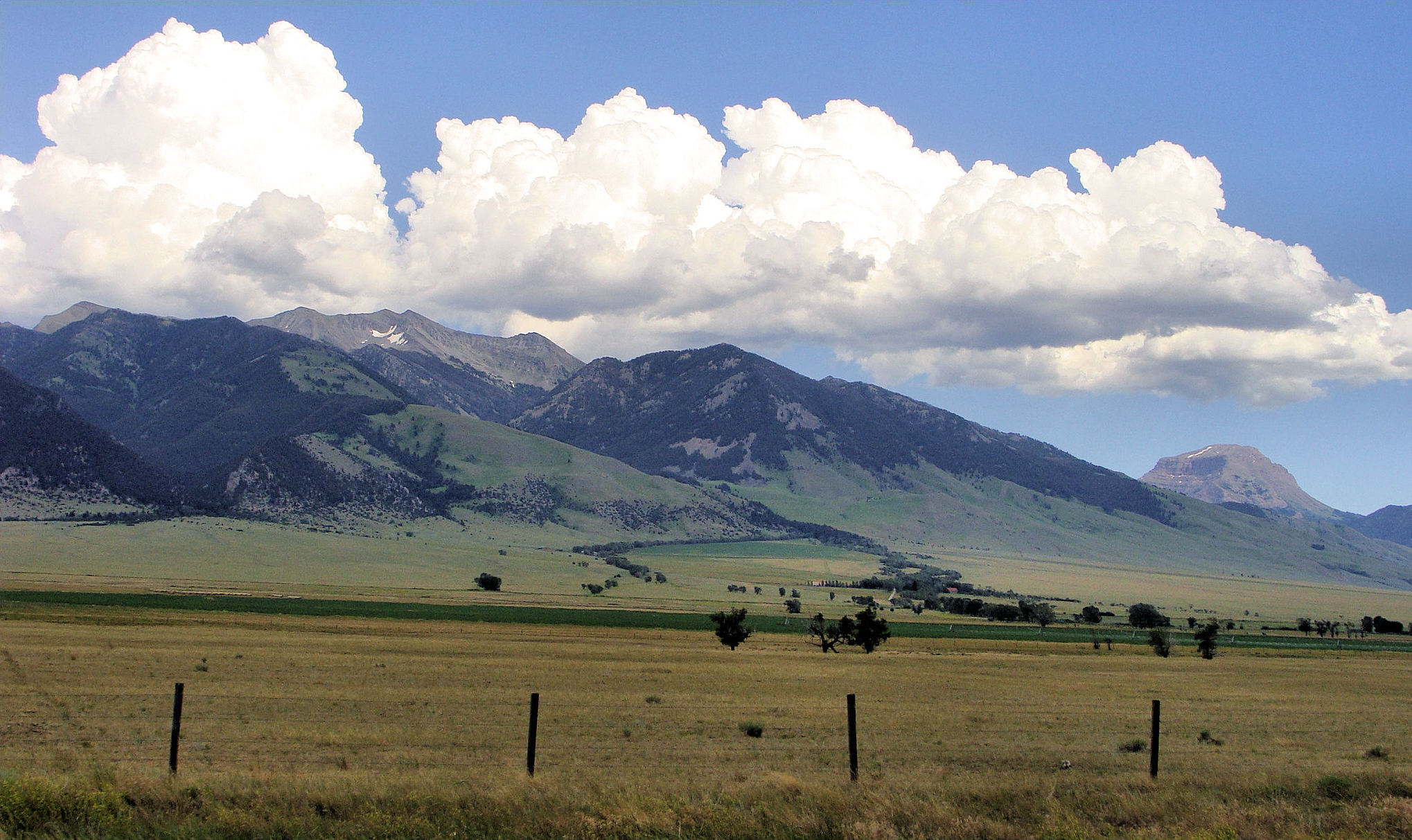
- Hilgard Peak appears as a sharp horn in between the two dark forested peaks

Highest point
- Elevation: 11,321 ft (3,451 m)
- Prominence: 4,063 ft (1,238 m)
- Coordinates: 44°54′59″N 111°27′38″W

Geography
- Location within Montana Location within the United States
- Location: Madison County, Montana, U.S.
- Parent range: Madison Range
- Topo map(s): USGS Hilgard Peak, MT

Climbing
- Easiest route: Scramble

Hilgard Peak (11,321 feet (3,451 m)) is the tallest mountain in the Madison Range in the U.S. state of Montana. The summit is located in a remote section of the Lee Metcalf Wilderness within the Beaverhead-Deerlodge National Forest. The peak was first climbed in 1948. The peak was named for E. W. Hilgard, a geology professor who served on the Hayden Expedition during its exploration of the Yellowstone area.
