= Snowcrest Range =

Mountain range in Montana, United States

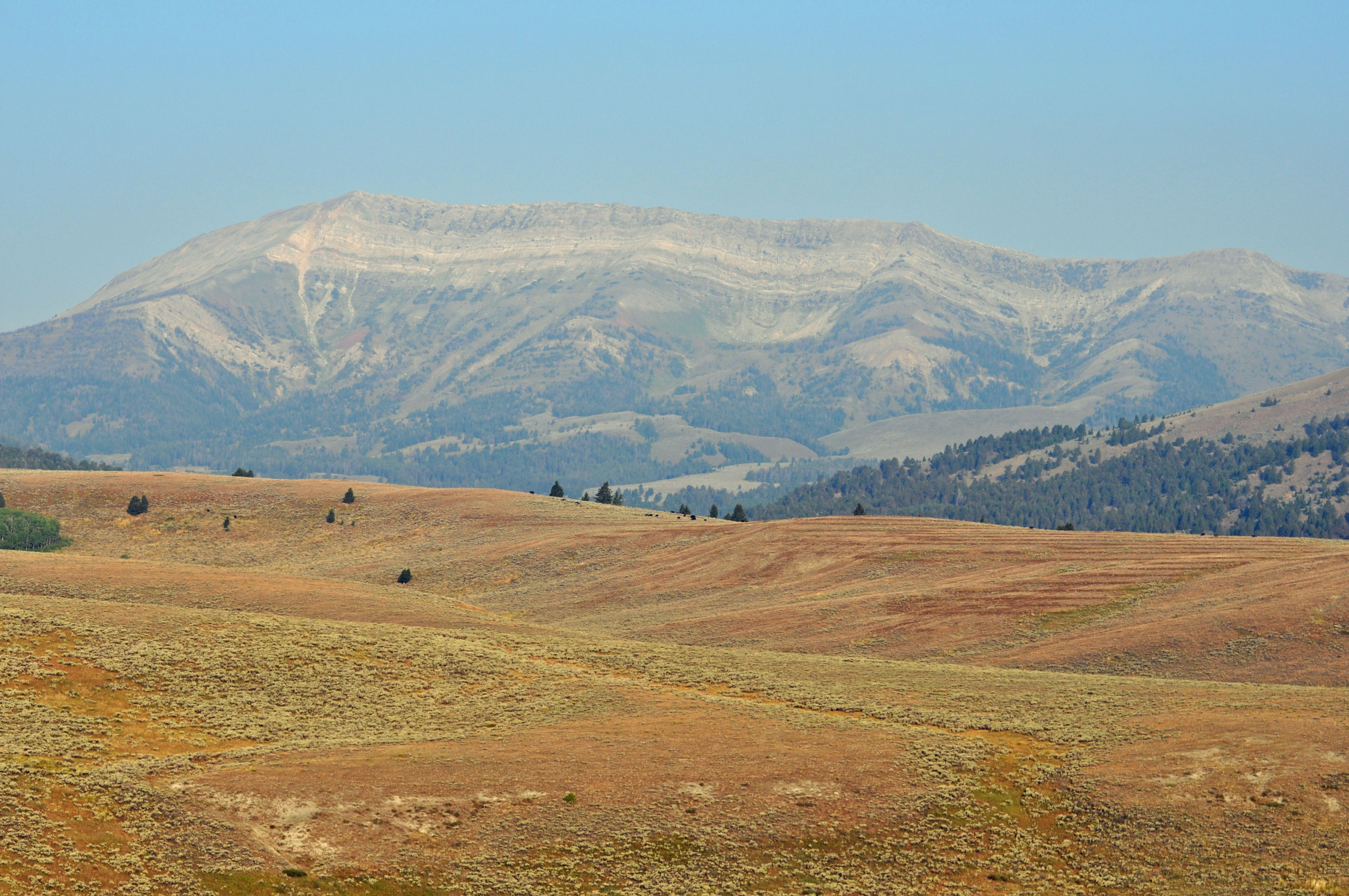
- Hogback Mountain, a prominent peak in the range

Highest point
- Peak: Sunset Peak (Snowcrest Range)
- Elevation: 10,581 ft (3,225 m)
- Coordinates: 44°50′34″N 112°05′41″W

Geography
- Location within Montana
- Country: United States
- State: Montana

The Snowcrest Range, el. 10,581 feet (3,225 m), is a small mountain range southeast of Dillon, Montana in Madison County, Montana. The Snowcrest and adjacent Gravelly Range is one of Montana's most popular hunting grounds. The two mountain ranges are home to nearly 10,000 elk and a growing population of grizzly bears.

The Snowcrest Range is extremely wild, with about 166,000 acres of roadless country, including 97,000 acres of roadless National Forest, as well as adjacent private and state lands.

Wolke characterizes the Snowcrest thus: "Spectacular grassland foothills and slopes rise through a thin band of Limber Pine, Douglas-Fir, Aspen, spruce, and fir to alpine summits . . . [t]his is high, dry, east-slope country, and the rich habitat mosaic is superb for Elk, Bighorn, Moose, Mule Deer, Red Tailed Hawk, Swainson's Hawk and Golden Eagle." The Snowcrest Range receives very little use outside of hunting season.

Sunset Peak, el. 10,581, is the highest point in the Snowcrest Range. (Although Wolke lists Sunset's elevation at 10,573, Peakbagger.com lists its elevation as 10,581).

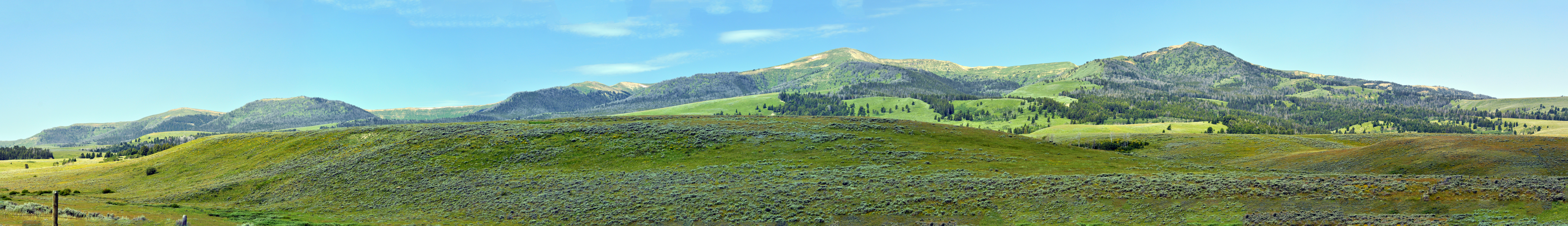
Southern extent of Snowcrest Range from Ruby River valley
Northern extent of Snowcrest Range from Ruby River valley

== See also ==
- List of mountain ranges in Montana
