= Mount Douglas (Montana) =

Mountain in Montana, United States

- Location within Montana

Highest point
- Elevation: 11,287 ft (3,440 m)
- Prominence: 1,642 ft (500 m)
- Coordinates: 45°18′24″N 110°08′23″W

Geography
- Location: Sweet Grass County, Montana, U.S.
- Parent range: Absaroka Range
- Topo map(s): USGS Mount Douglas, MT

Climbing
- First ascent: Unknown

Mount Douglas (11,287 feet (3,440 m)) is a mountain located in the Absaroka Range, Gallatin National Forest in the U.S. state of Montana. Mount Douglas is the tallest peak in Sweet Grass County, Montana and is within the Absaroka-Beartooth Wilderness. Mount Douglas is named for E. M. Douglas, of the United States Geological Survey.
