= Granite Range (Montana) =

Mountain range in Montana, United States

- Location within Montana

Highest point
- Elevation: 12,652 ft (3,856 m)
- Coordinates: 45°15′36″N 109°49′49″W

Dimensions
- Area: 315 mi^{2} (820 km^{2})

Geography
- Country: United States
- State: Montana

The Granite Range, el. 11,092 feet (3,381 m), is a mountain range southwest of Absarokee, Montana in Stillwater County, Montana.

== See also ==
- List of mountain ranges in Montana
