= Ch-paa-qn Peak =

Mountain in Montana, United States

- Location within Montana

Highest point
- Elevation: 7,989 ft (2,435 m)
- Coordinates: 47°09′28″N 114°21′21″W

Geography
- Location: Missoula, Montana, U.S.
- Parent range: Rocky Mountains

Ch-paa-qn (Squaw) Peak is in Missoula County, Montana, United States northwest of Missoula, Montana. Ch-paa-qn is a Salish word meaning "shining peak".

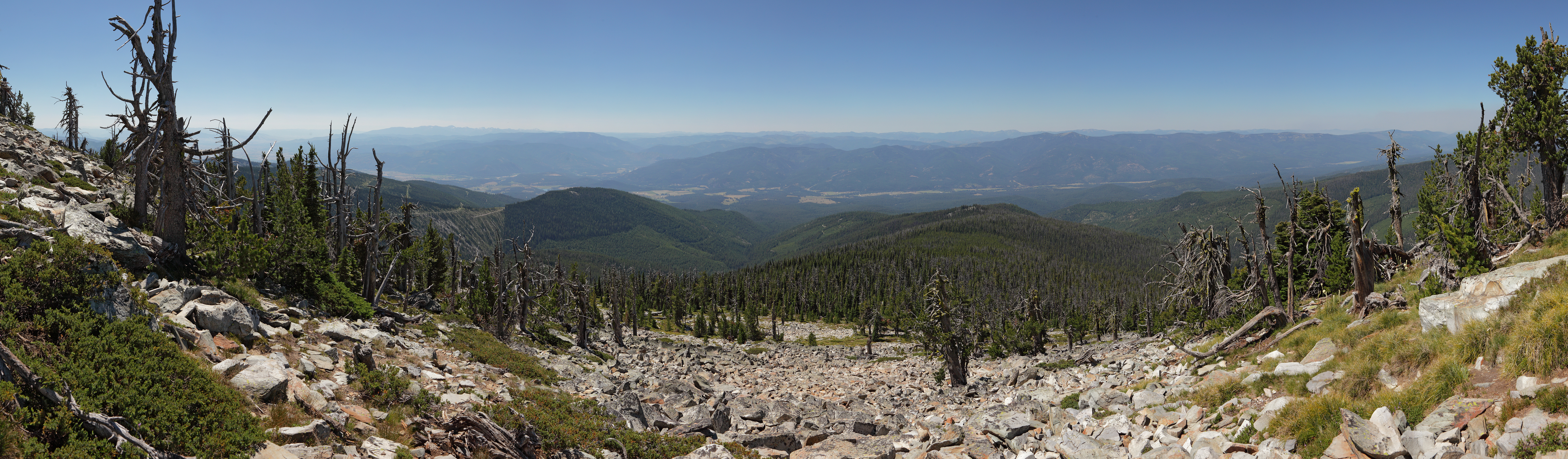
Panoramic view SW from near the summit.
