= Crazy Mountains =

Mountain range in Montana, United States

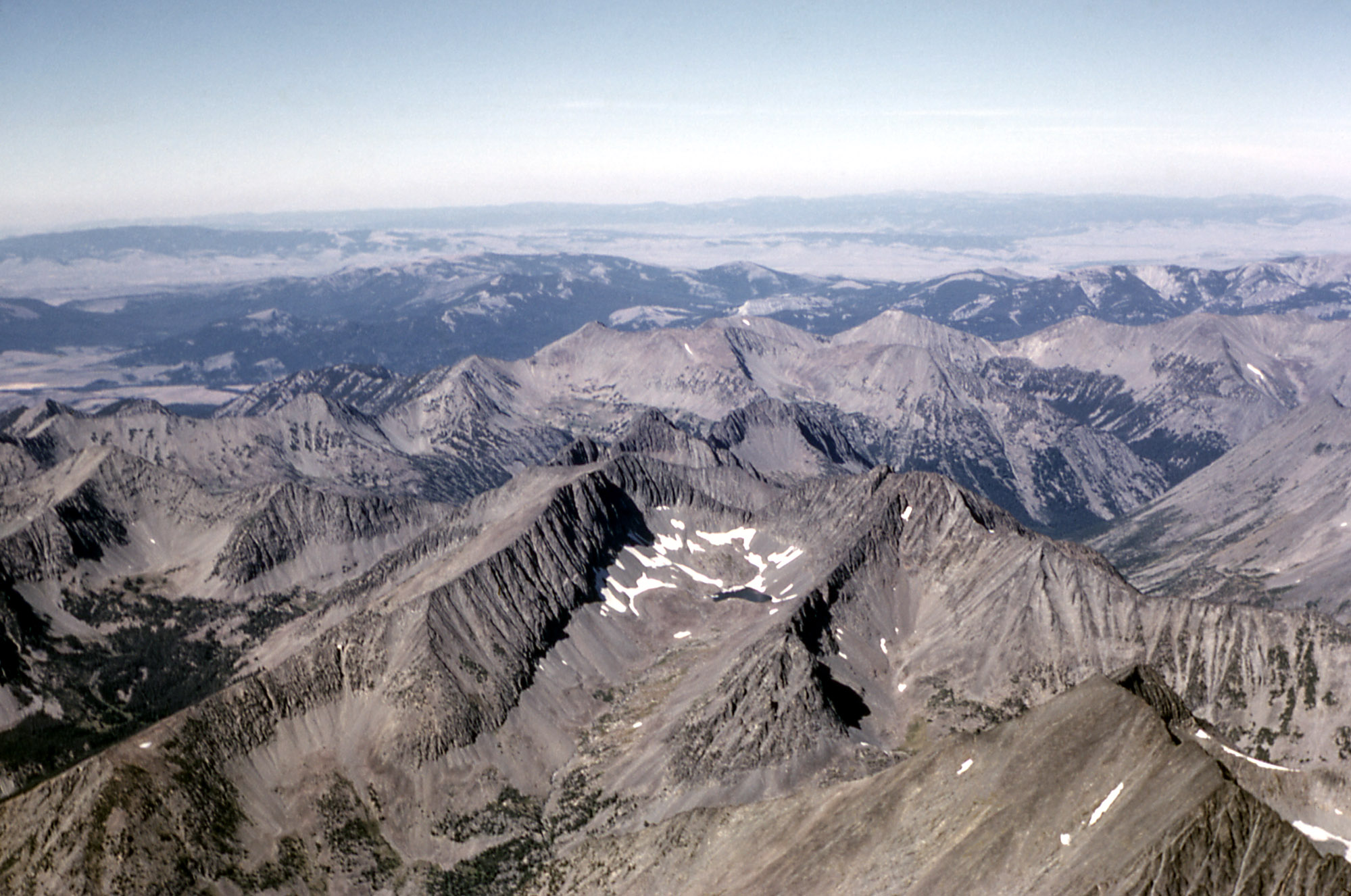
- Crazy Mountains

Highest point
- Peak: Crazy Peak
- Elevation: 11,214 ft (3,418 m)
- Coordinates: 46°01′04″N 110°16′36″W

Dimensions
- Length: 40 mi (64 km) N/S
- Width: 15 mi (24 km) E/W
- Area: 600 mi^{2} (1,600 km^{2})

Geography
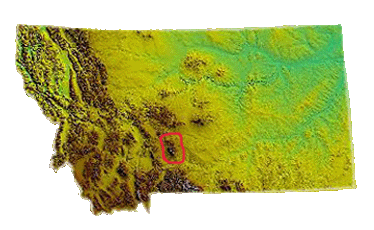
- Location within Montana
- Country: United States
- State: Montana
- Parent range: Rocky Mountains

The Crazy Mountains, often called the Crazies, is a mountain range in the Central Montana Alkalic Province in the U.S. state of Montana. They are a part of the northern Rocky Mountains.

== Geography ==
Spanning a distance of 40 miles (64 km), the Crazy Mountains are located between the Musselshell and Yellowstone rivers. The highest peak is Crazy Peak at 11,214 feet (3,418 m). Rising over 7,000 feet (2,130 m) above the Great Plains to the east, the Crazies dominate their surroundings and are plainly visible just north of Interstate 90.

The Crazy Mountains form an isolated island range east of the Continental Divide. Other isolated ranges in Montana include the Castle Mountains, Little Belt Mountains, Big Snowy Mountains, Little Snowy Mountains, Bears Paw Mountains, Judith Mountains, North and South Moccasin Mountains, Highwood Mountains, Little Rocky Mountains, Sweet Grass Hills, Bull Mountains and, in the southeastern corner of the state near Ekalaka, the Long Pines.

=== Geology ===
The Big Timber Stock, a large igneous intrusion, forms the bedrock in the Crazy Mountains. The stock is of Tertiary age, and consists of diorite and gabbro with zones of Quartz Monzodiorite, which has been intruded by many dikes and sills.

Geological features of the Crazy Mountains include:

- Shields River
- South Fork Musselshell River
- Sweet Grass Creek
- Crazy Peak

=== Adjacent counties ===
- Meagher County, Montana - north
- Sweet Grass County, Montana - east
- Park County, Montana - west, south

== Wildlife ==
Due to the eastern location, these mountains are drier and less densely forested than other mountain ranges in Montana. There are at least 40 alpine lakes in the range, 15 of which are named. The Crazy Mountains sit in both Gallatin National Forest and Lewis and Clark National Forest. The Crazies support a healthy herd of mountain goats and the occasional elusive wolverine.

== History ==
In 1916, the Crazy Mountains were proposed as a location for a national park, yet Congress failed to pass the legislation. National Park Service officials considered the area again in 1935, yet they reported that a national park would not be feasible because "half of the land, every alternate section, is owned by the Northern Pacific Railroad or is in private hands."

== Access ==
The Crazies are almost completely surrounded by private lands making access into the mountains somewhat difficult, especially in the southern section where the highest peaks are located.

== Name origin ==
The name Crazy Mountains is said to be a shortened form of the name "Crazy Woman Mountains" given them in complement to their original Crow name, after a woman who went insane and lived in them after her family was killed in the westward settlement movement.

The Crow people called the mountains Awaxaawippíia, roughly translated as "Ominous Mountains", or even more roughly, "Crazy Mountains". They were famous to the Crow people for having metaphysical powers and being unpredictable—a place used for vision quests.

Images of the Crazy Mountains
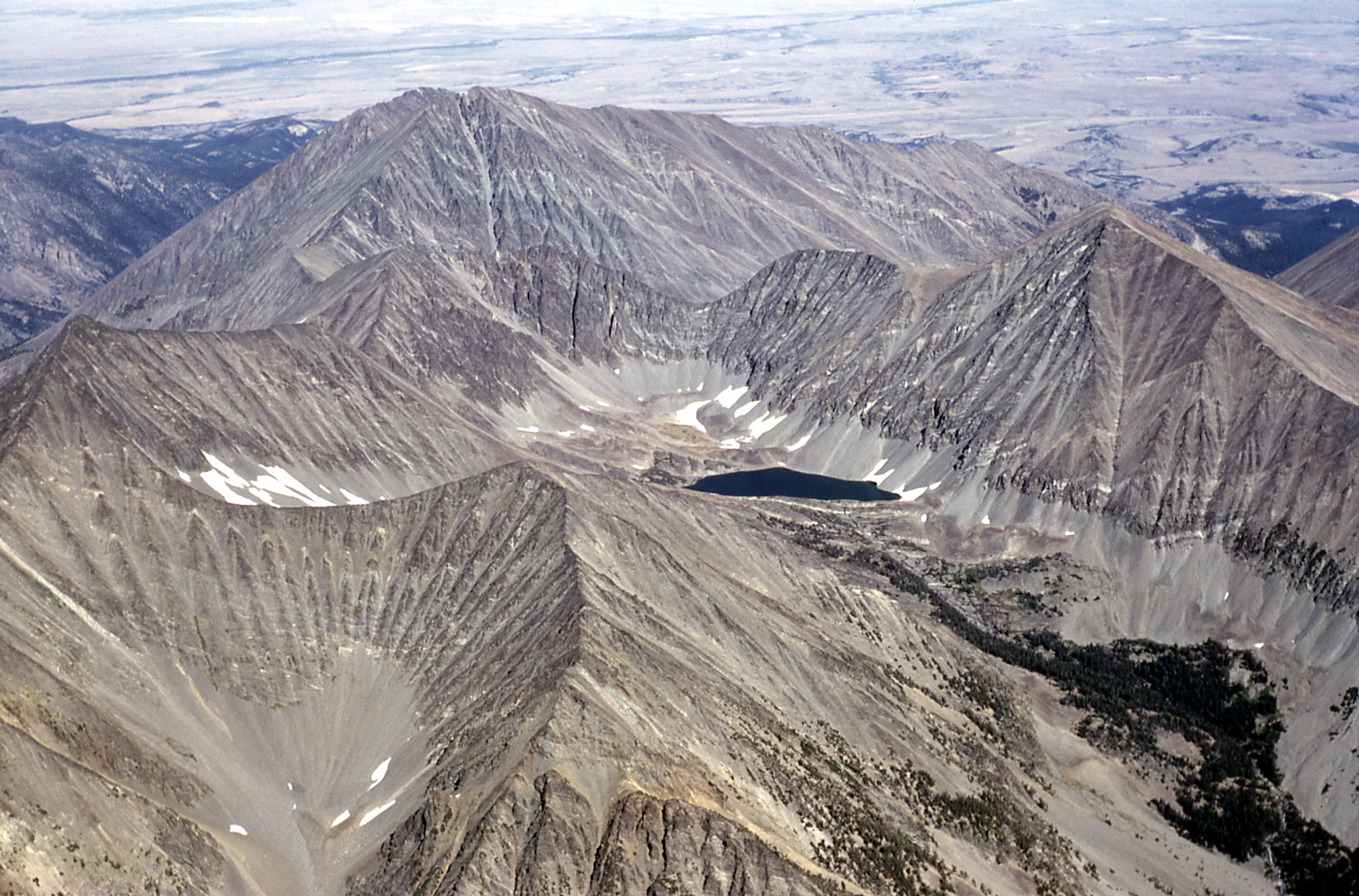
Crazy Peak (left background) rises above a relatively barren region

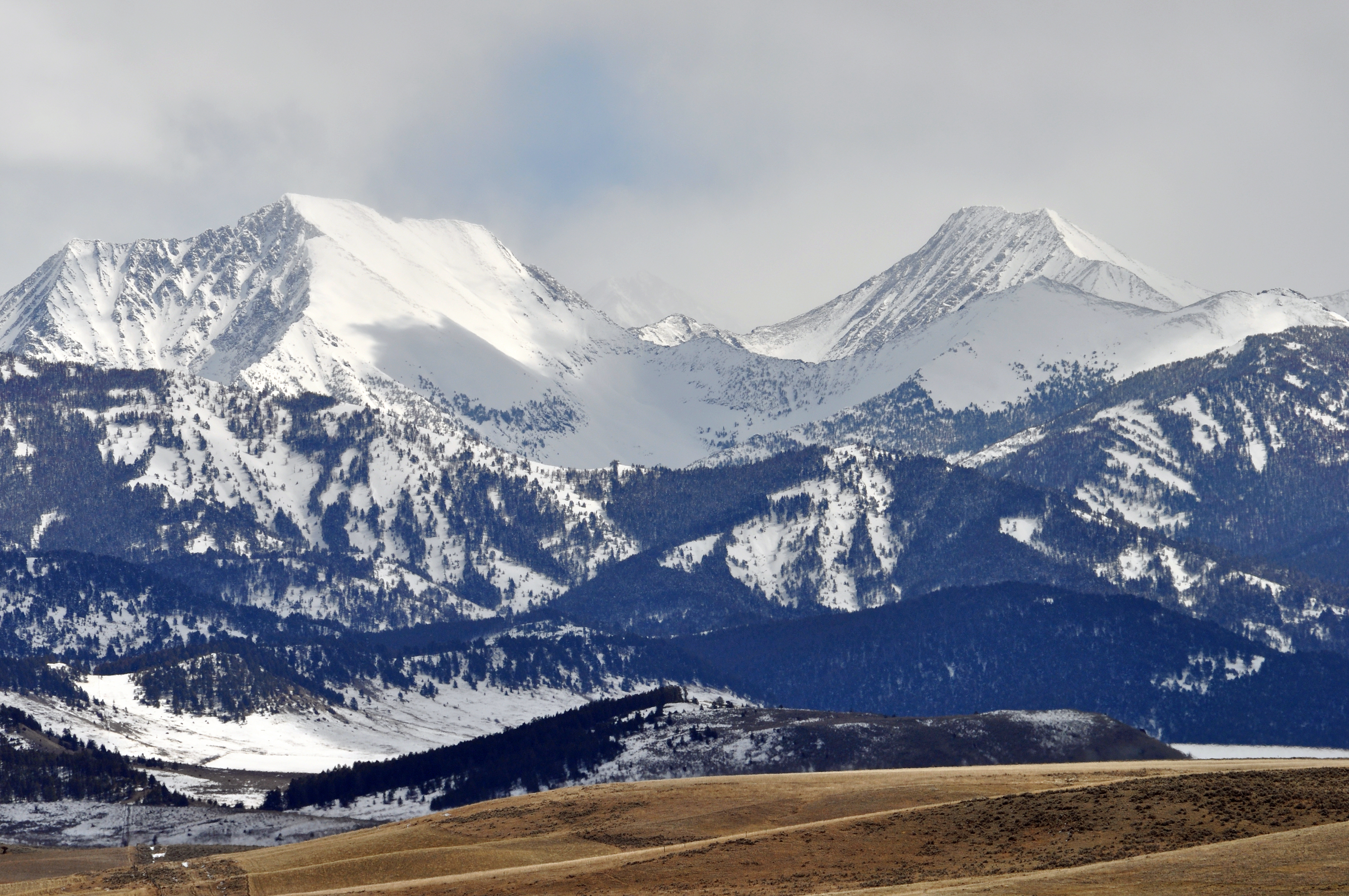
Peaks in the Crazy Mountains as viewed from Wilsall, Montana

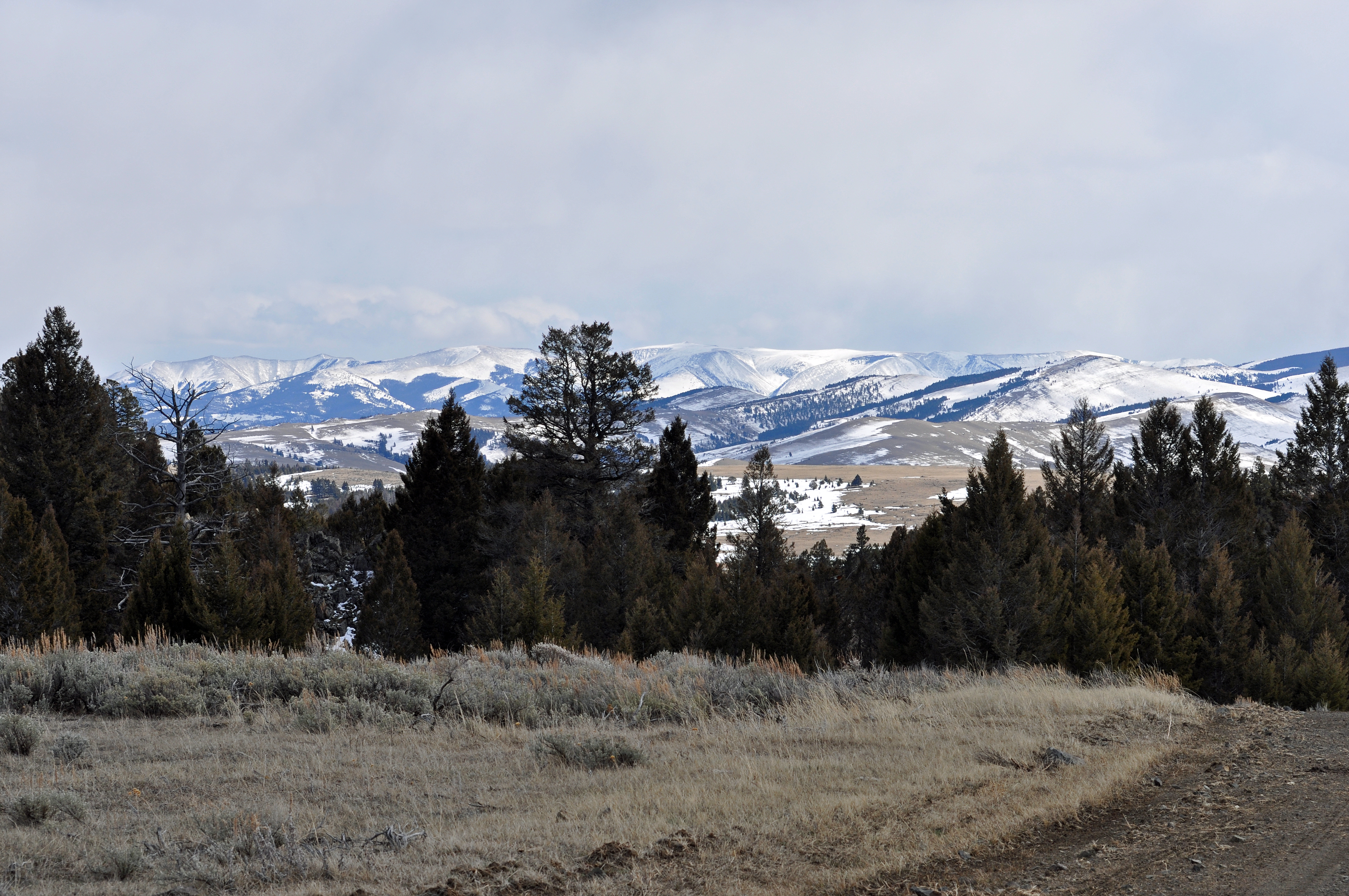
The northern reaches of the Crazy Mountains as seen from the foothills of the Castle Mountains

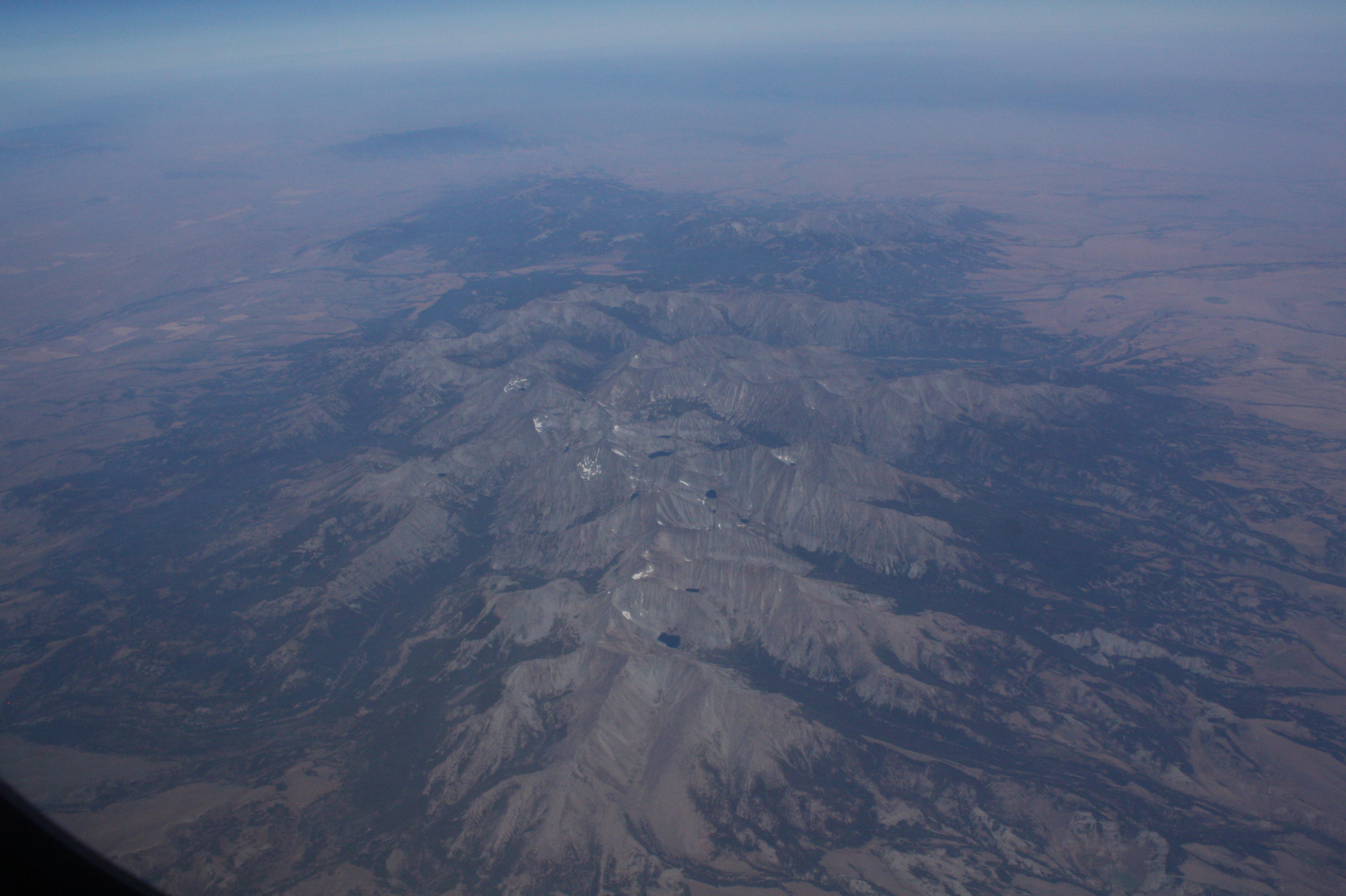
Air photo facing north, August 2017

South Face of Crazy Mountains

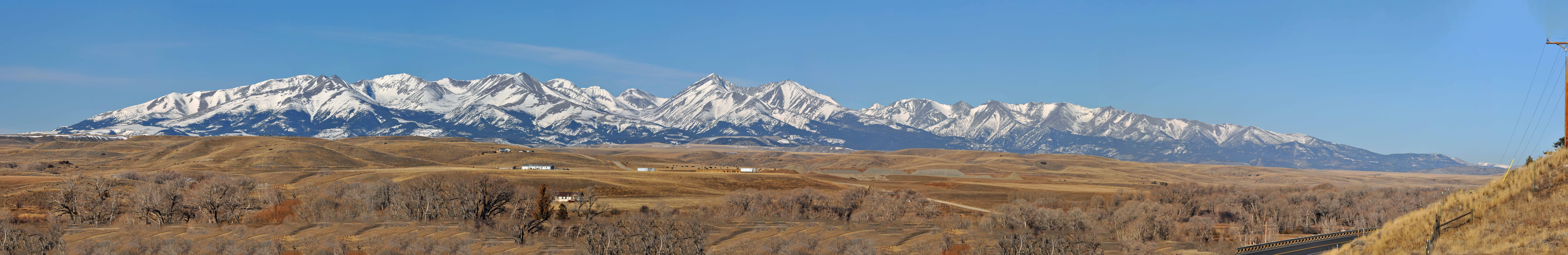
East Face of Crazy Mountains

== See also ==
- List of mountain ranges in Montana
