= Geology of Montana =

The geology of Montana includes thick sequences of Paleozoic, Mesozoic and Cenozoic sedimentary rocks overlying ancient Archean and Proterozoic crystalline basement rock. Eastern Montana has considerable oil and gas resources, while the uplifted Rocky Mountains in the west, which resulted from the Laramide orogeny and other tectonic events have locations with metal ore.

== Geologic history, stratigraphy and tectonics ==
The oldest rocks in Montana are part of the Archean Wyoming Craton in the center and east of the state, primarily between Livingston and Red Lodge as well as small areas in the Little Belt Mountains around Neihart and the core of the Little Rocky Mountains south of Harlem. Drill cores indicate that these rocks underlie much of the Great Plains.

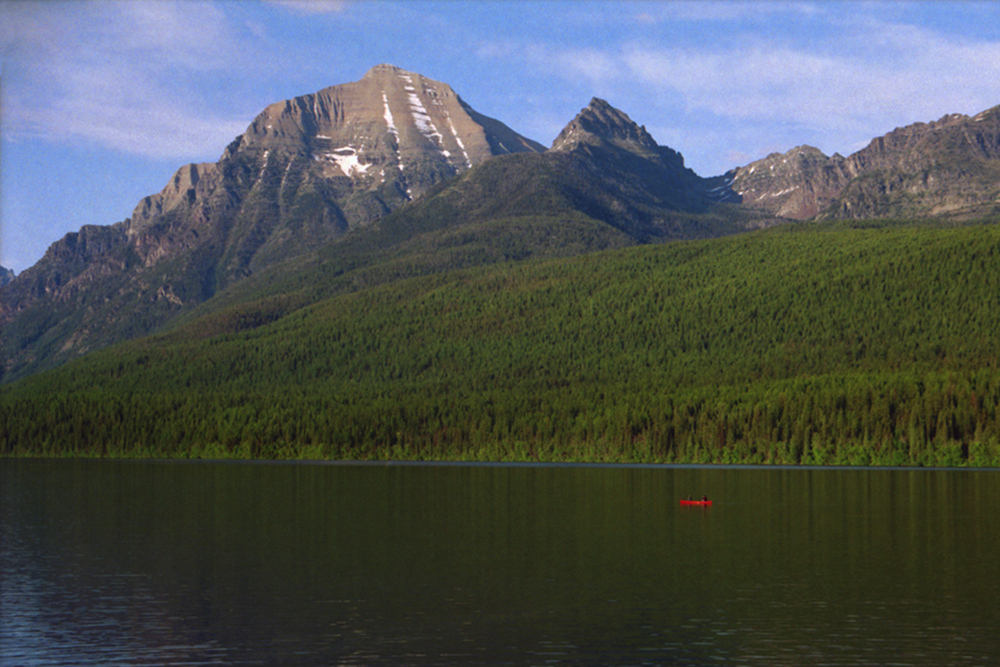
Rainbow Peak and Bowman Lake, Glacier National Park

The Pony Group, Cherry Creek Group and the Stillwater Complex are examples of Precambrian metamorphic rock units The first two groups are made up of folded and metamorphosed marine sedimentary rocks. They were subsequently intruded by gabbro, diabase and granite. The Stillwater Complex, by contrast, is made up of ultrabasic igneous rocks exposed at the surface in Park, Stillwater, and Sweet Grass Counties. Together, these three rock formations formed between 2.54 and 1.69 billion years ago.

The Pony Group and Cherry Creek Group are overlain by the Belt Series sedimentary rocks, which deposited after a period of erosion that left a large unconformity. These shallow water rocks from the Neoproterozoic range between 35,000 and 50,000 feet thick, overlain by additional Middle Cambrian sedimentary rocks.

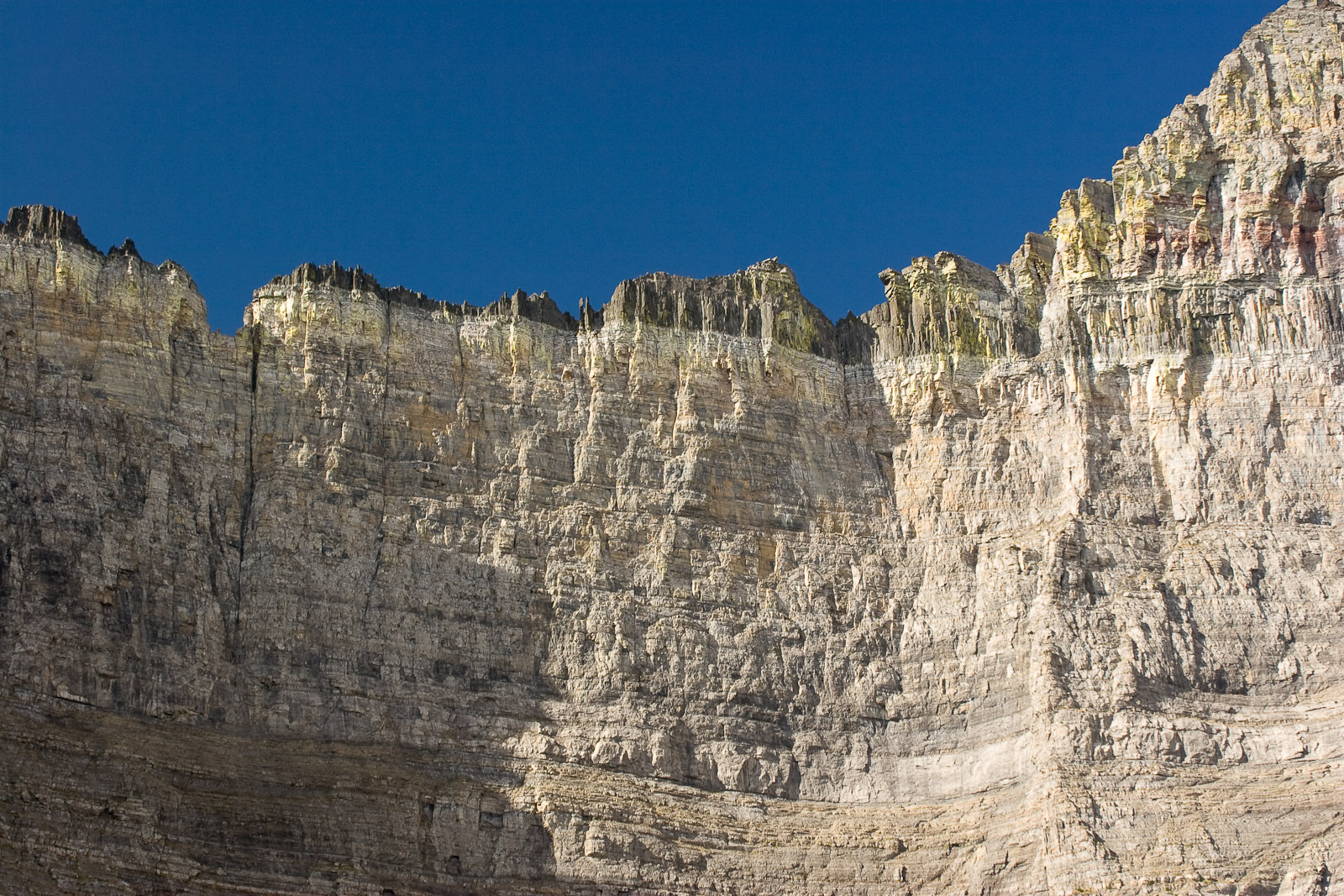
Iceberg Lake Ridge, Glacier National Park

Belt rocks make up the mountains around St. Mary Lake at Glacier National Park. Deposition took place in a broad trough extending southeast to the Big Snowy Mountains as well as to the southwest through Three Forks, Whitehall the Highland Mountains, and Armstead.

The Lewis Overthrust is a geologic thrust fault structure of the Rocky Mountains found within the Glacier National Park and the bordering Waterton Lakes National Park in Canada. The structure was created due to the collision of tectonic plates about 59-75 million years ago that drove a several mile thick wedge of Precambrian rock 50 mi (80 km) eastwards, causing it to overlie softer Cretaceous age rock that is 1300 to 1400 million years younger.

Regional low-grade metamorphism altered sandstone, carbonates and silty shale to quartzite, argillite and dolomite. Geologists divide the rocks into four units, from oldest to youngest the pre-Ravalli rocks, the Ravalli, the Piegan, and the Missoula groups. In some locations, late Precambrian sills, dikes and lava flows are found. The Sunshine Mine in the Coeur d'Alene district of Idaho, which is in correlates with the Ravalli Group. Uranium mineralized in the rock 1.19 million years ago, giving a young age for limit for the surrounding rocks.

=== Paleozoic (539-251 million years ago) ===
Thick sequences of sedimentary rock deposited during the Paleozoic, reaching thicknesses of up to 10,000 feet. Sixteen miles west of Missoula and further west, all Paleozoic rocks have eroded away. To the east, Paleozoic rocks are exposed and upturned along the Rocky Mountains.

Most Paleozoic rocks originated in a marine environment, particularly dolomite and limestone together with shale, siltstone, sandstone, and evaporites such as gypsum, anhydrite and salt.

=== Mesozoic (251-66 million years ago) ===
During the Mesozoic, one mile thick sedimentary rocks accumulated across 55 percent of the state. They are exposed at the surface due to the Black Hills uplift and the Cedar Creek Anticline. Marine rocks alternate with terrestrial sandstone, indicating a string of marine transgression and regression events. In the Cretaceous, the Laramide orogeny began to assemble the Rocky Mountains, intruding granite in Ravalli County as well as the Boulder Batholith and Tobacco Root Batholith. Tuff and andesite lava flows resulting from volcanic eruptions is found interbedded in sedimentary rocks.

=== Cenozoic (66 million years ago-present) ===
Continued uplift due to the Laramide orogeny drove accelerated erosion in the Cenozoic. Eastern Montana lowlands were covered in up to 4000 feet of sediment. The Fort Union Formation in the east, made up of the Tongue River, Lebo and Tullock members is a remnant of Paleocene deposition. It is overlain by Wasatch Formation mudstone and stream conglomerate which has been significantly eroded. Intermontane valleys preserve thick sequences of Oligocene and Miocene rocks that are rare in other parts of the Eastern Plains. These sediments vary considerably, from claystone, mudstone and siltstone to bentonite, diatomaceous earth, coal and tuff. The Pliocene Flaxville Formation is the youngest rock unit in Montana.

== Natural resource geology ==
Igneous intrusive rocks are associated with metals such as copper, gold, silver, lead, zinc and tungsten. In the Idaho Batholith, Boulder Batholith and Tobacco Root Batholith, intrusive granite bodies are particularly common and often contain metal ore. Precambrian rocks in the southwest contain corundum, talc, iron ore, graphite, sillimanite and kyanite in the Cherry Creek Group, while chromite is common in the Stillwater Complex that spans Stillwater and Sweet Grass counties. The western third of Montana has sedimentary rocks from the Paleozoic and Mesozoic which are potential sources of phosphate rock, limestone, silica, crushed stone and clay. In places bentonite has been mined from altered volcanic ash beds in Cenozoic intermontane sedimentary basins.

Central Montana has metal ore deposits that have been mined in the Little Rocky Mountains, the North Moccasin Mountains, the Judith Mountains and the Little Belt Mountains. The region also has significant production of oil and natural gas from the Cat Creek anticline, the Kevin-Sunburst dome and the Sweet Grass arch. Mesozoic sandstones are a primary reservoir rock. Some Cretaceous sandstone, for example The Third Cat Creek sandstone at the base of the Kootenai Formation, the Virgelle sandstone member of the Eagle Sandstone, and the Fox Hill Sandstone, are valuable ground water aquifers all dating to the Cretaceous. The Kootenai Formation also contains clay usable for brick and tile. Much of central Montana is underlain by Jurassic and Cretaceous coal beds.

Although there are no metal ore deposits in the eastern third of the state, the region holds more than 90 percent of Montana's coal reserves. The coal is part of the Paleocene Fort Union Formation, particularly the Tongue River Member. The eastern region produces petroleum, principally in the western Williston Basin and the Cedar Creek Anticline. Most hydrocarbons come from Paleozoic rocks, although some are sourced from Cretaceous rock. Bentonite is mined from Cretaceous beds in Carter County.
