= Black Horse Lake =

Seasonal lake in Montana, US

- Location within Montana Location within the United States
- Location: Great Falls, Montana
- Coordinates: 47°36′21″N 111°13′14″W
- Type: Endorheic basin
- Basin countries: United States
- Surface elevation: 3,415 ft (1,041 m)

Black Horse Lake is a seasonal lake just north of present-day Great Falls, Montana. The lake is usually dry, except during the spring and early summer.

== Location ==
Black horse Lake is located approximately 3 miles (4.8 km) southeast of Benton Lake National Wildlife Refuge.

== History ==
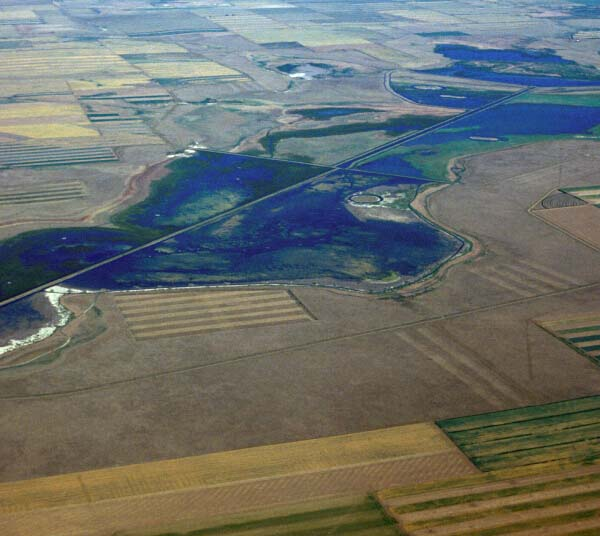
The nearby Benton Lake. 2013 photo.

This lake was previously a large, year round lake. According to historical records, the nearby Benton Lake, was used by early European settlers in the Great Falls, Montana region, to irrigate farms. A canal or canals were dug to drain Benton Lake for irrigation. The one remaining canal leads from northwest to southeast, directly to Black Horse Lake. The canal abruptly stops about a third of a mile from where Black Horse Lake was situated. Black Horse lake is 3,415 feet (1,041 m) above sea level while nearby Benton Lake is 3,625 feet (1,105 m) above sea level.

In 2008 the United States Department of Energy obliged Montana Alberta Tie Ltd to route power-lines away from the lake.

== Ecology ==
The lake is an alkali wetlands and a habitat to waterfowl, gulls and shorebirds. It floods seasonally.

== Size ==
The present size of Black Horse Lake varies due to varying precipitation and other factors. In dry years, the lake never fills up at all. The lakes maximum extent is 1.5 miles from north to south, and 1.25 miles from east to west covering an area of 3 square miles (7.8 km^{2}).

== See also ==
- Chippewa Indians of Montana
