= Little Rocky Mountains =

Group of buttes in Montana, USA

Coordinates: 48°00′34″N 108°36′07″W

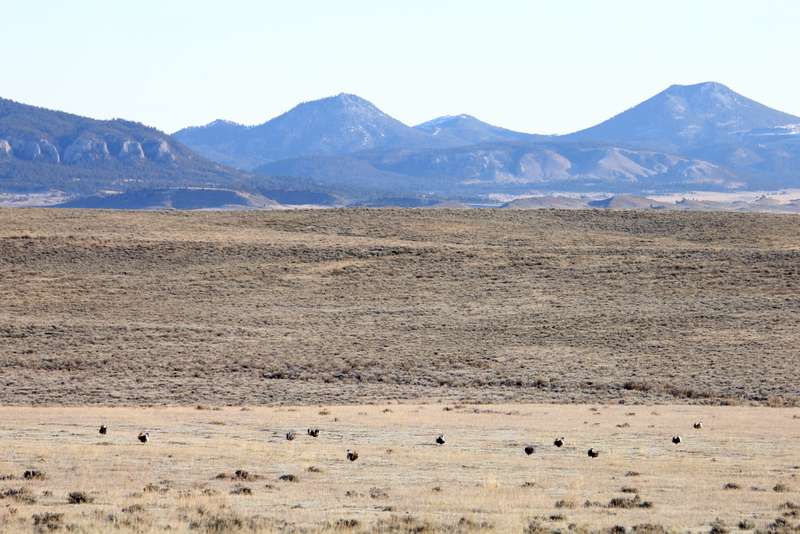
Greater sage-grouse in lek, with the Little Rocky Mountains in the background

The Little Rocky Mountains, also known as the Little Rockies, are a group of buttes, roughly 765 km^{2} in area, located towards the southern end of the Fort Belknap Indian Reservation in Blaine County and Phillips County in north-central Montana. Their highest summit is Antoine Butte (~5720 ft (1743 m)). Old Scraggy Peak is 5,708 feet.

The nearest town is Dodson, Montana.

Like the nearby North and South Moccasin mountains and Judith Mountains, the Little Rockies were a target for gold miners.

Eagle Child Mountain in the western portion of the range was sacred to the Gros Ventre people.

== See also ==
- List of mountain ranges in Montana
