= Benton Lake (Montana) =

Lake and wetland in Montana, USA

Coordinates: 47°41′10″N 111°21′08″W

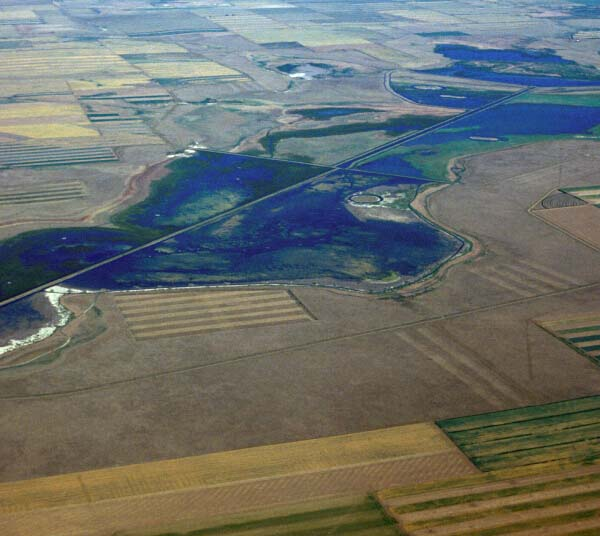
Benton Lake in 2013

Benton Lake is a 5,600 acre wetland in the U.S. state of Montana, and within both the Benton Lake National Wildlife Refuge and the Benton Lake Wetland Management District.

== Location and description ==
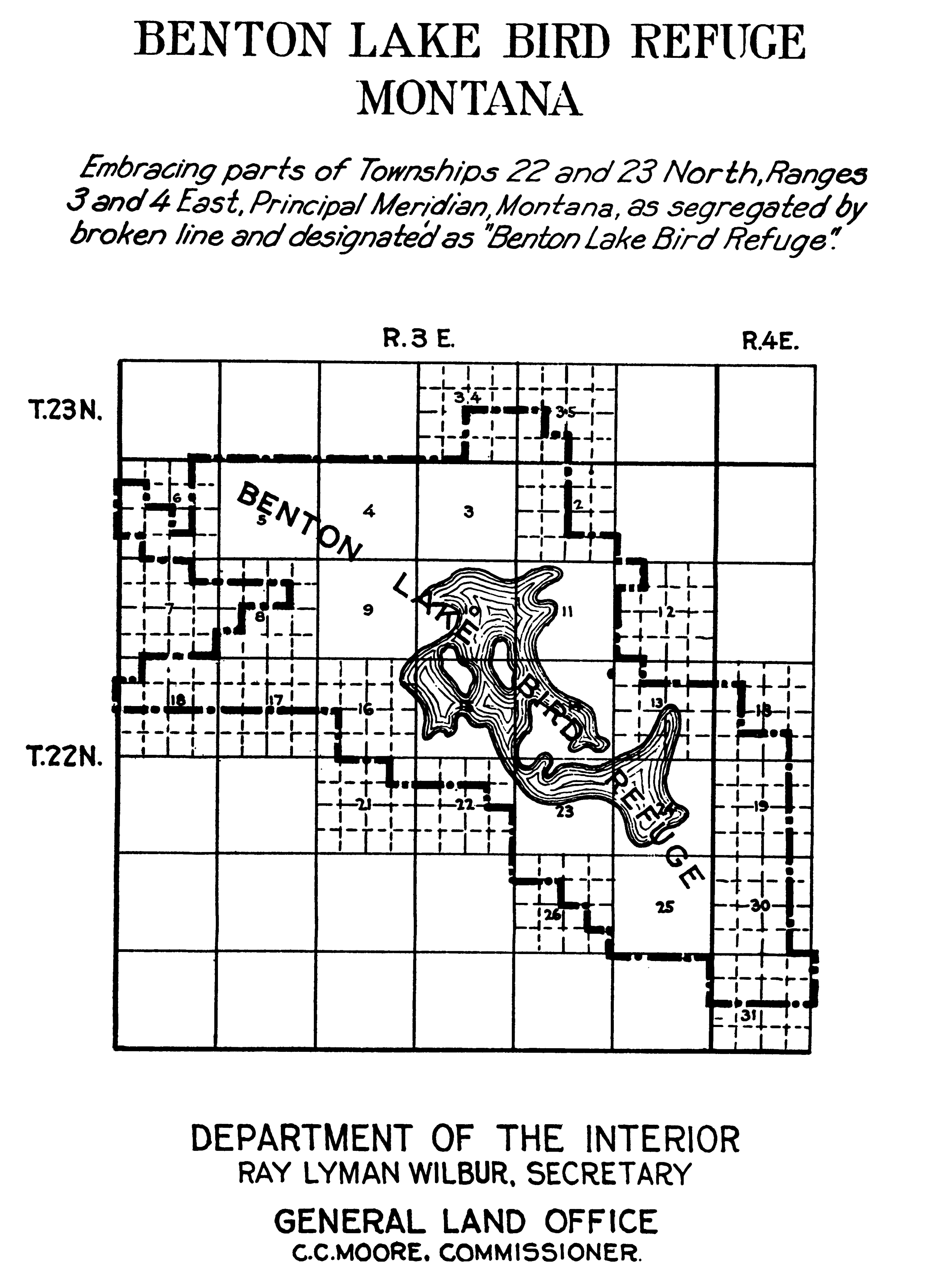
1929 illustration of the area of the bird refuge area

The lake is in west-central Montana within both the Benton Lake National Wildlife Refuge and the Benton Lake Wetland Management District. Benton Lake is located approximately 3 miles north west of Black Horse Lake.

The lake is a 5,600 acre shallow wetland with no natural outlets. Water volumes vary seasonally.

== History ==
The lake was created during the Pleistocene glacial period.

The Benton Lake Wetland Management District was created in 1929.

== Ecology ==
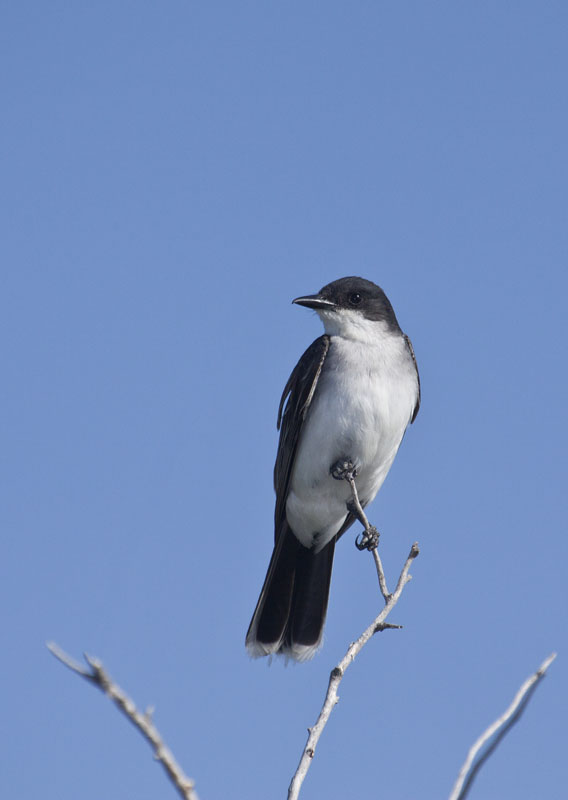
An eastern kingbird at Benton Lake, 2011

The lake hosts waterbirds, especially dabbing ducks.
