= Benton Lake Wetland Management District =

Conservation district in Montana, USA

- IUCN category IV (habitat/species management area)
- Location within the United States
- Location: Montana, USA
- Nearest city: Great Falls, MT
- Coordinates: 47°39′57″N 111°19′59″W
- Area: 16,000 acres (25 sq mi; 65 km^{2})
- Established: 1975
- Governing body: U.S. Fish and Wildlife Service
- Website: Benton Lake Wetland Management District

Benton Lake Wetland Management District is the largest wetland management district in the United States, located in the state of Montana. Covering an area of 16,000 acres (25 sq mi; 65 km^{2}) around Benton Lake, the district extends from the Canada–United States border to Helena, Montana. Within the district are 23 Waterfowl Production Areas under conservation easements with local landowners ensuring these areas will not be developed, yet will remain within private ownership. The district is managed by the U.S. Fish and Wildlife Service with headquarters located at Benton Lake National Wildlife Refuge.
