= Ojibwe in Montana =

The Chippewa or Ojibwe is a large group of Native Americans many of which now live in the state of Montana.

== Origins ==
Originally, the Ojibwe lived further eastwards in the Great Lakes region. Their history is tied to the Seven fires prophecy which brought them to the Montana region and beyond, from 1000 to 1500 years ago.

The Chippewas followed the prophecy and migrated west. The second stopping place may have been Niagara Falls, but they named the location "Great Falls," which may be Git-chi Ka-bay-cone in the Chippewa language. Another theory proposes that the stopping place was Great Falls, Montana.

=== The People of the Falls ===
According to William W. Warren, the Dakota people named the Chippewa the "People of the Falls" (in Dakota Ra-ra-to-oans), not the French. Supposedly the name refers to the falls in the Sault Ste. Marie region of Michigan and Ontario. However, the Dakota may have been referring to the Great Falls of the Missouri.

Once the first Chippewa settlers reached the Great Falls region, they could not ignore the five waterfalls which make up the Great Falls of the Missouri River, and also Giant Springs which is the largest freshwater spring in the United States. At one time a lake was located a few miles north of Great Falls which is known as Black Horse Lake. To the northwest of Black Horse Lake is Benton Lake. Historians claim the United States wanted to use Benton Lake for irrigation for nearby farms and in the late 19th century commenced to dig canals for that purpose.

The one remaining canal in Benton Lake leads directly to what is left of Black Horse Lake, which is now just an indention in the land. Within Black Horse Lake was a possible island which is turtle shaped. It is one of the many buttes in the Great Falls region. It is around 200 feet higher than the elevation below Black Horse Lake.

== Non-treaty ==
Chippewa leaders who refused to recognize treaties with the United States brought about the problem of landless Chippewas in Montana.

Among the defiant Chippewa leaders of Montana who refused to sign the treaties were Chiefs Ahontoay, Big Bear, Little Bear, Little Shell III, and Lucky Man. As a result, the United States refused to recognize them and forced them off of reservation rolls, as well as claiming that they held no jurisdiction over them. Unlike the defiant Chippewa leaders, Chippewa leaders like Chief Rocky Boy and Chief Buffalo Coat were willing to accept treaties. Chief Rocky Boy who became friends with the United States. Chief Buffalo Coat attempted to negotiate a treaty in 1898 but the United States claimed to have no jurisdiction to reach an agreement.

== Present day ==
The Chippewa in Montana live on these reservations:

- Blackfeet Reservation

In the early 1990s, the population of Browning, Montana was around 15% Chippewa, which may indicate the percentage of the Indian population on the Blackfeet Reservation. The Indian population between those two Blackfeet settlements is almost entirely Chippewa. Around 1500 or more Chippewa presently live here.

- Crow Reservation and Northern Cheyenne Reservation

It is difficult to ascertain the Chippewa population here due to the presence of the Muskegoes (who are called Swampy Cree, but according to Warren, these Muskegoes are the northernmost Chippewas, as Mushkegowuk means "Swampy People" in the Chippewa language). Historical records from around 1900 tell of at least 40 lodges of Muskegoes living here. With an average number of six people living in each lodge, the Chippewa population here would have been around 240. The population in 1900 was around 2000, which would put the Chippewa population at over 10%.

- Flathead Reservation

A Chippewa population has always lived here. This includes the Muskegoes. A historical population record of the Muskegoes from around 1896 put their population at around 250 or 40 lodges. That does not include the other Chippewa. Around 1900, the Indian population here was just under 2000. Chippewa may make up 20% or more of the Indian population. However, only around 200 still maintain their Chippewa identity now.

- Fort Belknap Reservation

The number of Chippewa clinging to their tribal identity here is large.

- Fort Peck Reservation

This reservation has a large Chippewa population.

- Rocky Boy Reservation

This is the only official Chippewa reservation in Montana. However, the United States claims that the Cree and Métis make up 90% of population.
