= Crazy Peak =

Mountain in Montana, United States

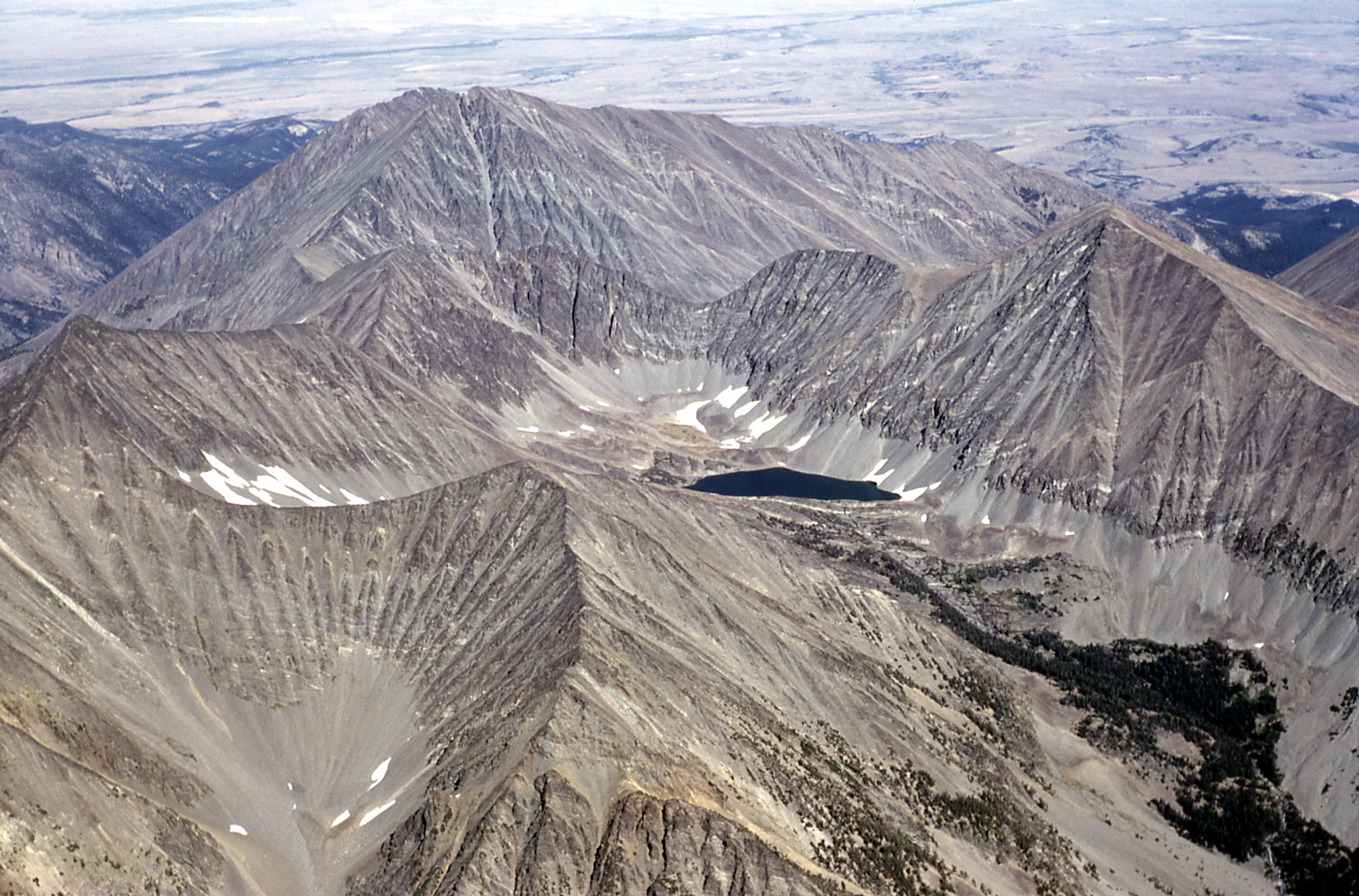
- Crazy Peak at left background

Highest point
- Elevation: 11,209 ft (3,417 m)
- Prominence: 5,719 ft (1,743 m)
- Listing: US most prominent peaks 79th
- Coordinates: 46°01′05″N 110°16′36″W

Geography
- Location within Montana Location within the United States
- Location: Sweet Grass County, Montana, U.S.
- Parent range: Crazy Mountains
- Topo map: USGS Crazy Peak

Climbing
- Easiest route: Hike, scramble

Crazy Peak, elevation 11,214 ft (3,418 m), is the highest peak in the Crazy Mountains, an island range of the Montana Rockies, in the United States. Crazy Peak dominates the surroundings, rising over 7,000 feet (2,100 m) above the Yellowstone River Valley, and is the highest peak in Montana north of the Beartooth Mountains, which are 50 miles (80 km) to the south. Crazy Peak is also the most topographically prominent peak in Montana. A small glacier exists on the northeast slope of the mountain. The mountain is located on private land within the Gallatin National Forest.

== Climate ==
Climate data for Crazy Peak 46.0196 N, 110.2753 W, Elevation: 10,600 ft (3,200 m) (1991–2020 normals)
Month	Jan	Feb	Mar	Apr	May	Jun	Jul	Aug	Sep	Oct	Nov	Dec	Year
Mean daily maximum °F (°C)	21.8 (−5.7)	21.1 (−6.1)	26.0 (−3.3)	31.3 (−0.4)	40.8 (4.9)	50.8 (10.4)	62.1 (16.7)	61.6 (16.4)	51.9 (11.1)	38.5 (3.6)	26.9 (−2.8)	20.9 (−6.2)	37.8 (3.2)
Daily mean °F (°C)	13.2 (−10.4)	11.6 (−11.3)	15.9 (−8.9)	20.5 (−6.4)	29.3 (−1.5)	38.6 (3.7)	48.3 (9.1)	47.9 (8.8)	39.2 (4.0)	27.5 (−2.5)	18.3 (−7.6)	12.6 (−10.8)	26.9 (−2.8)
Mean daily minimum °F (°C)	4.6 (−15.2)	2.1 (−16.6)	5.8 (−14.6)	9.6 (−12.4)	17.9 (−7.8)	26.4 (−3.1)	34.5 (1.4)	34.2 (1.2)	26.4 (−3.1)	16.6 (−8.6)	9.7 (−12.4)	4.3 (−15.4)	16.0 (−8.9)
Average precipitation inches (mm)	4.41 (112)	4.06 (103)	4.94 (125)	6.75 (171)	5.66 (144)	5.41 (137)	2.52 (64)	2.02 (51)	2.79 (71)	4.42 (112)	4.39 (112)	4.21 (107)	51.58 (1,309)
Source: PRISM Climate Group

== See also ==
- List of mountain peaks of North America
  - List of mountain peaks of the United States
    - List of Ultras of the United States
