= Central Montana Alkalic Province =

Geologic area in Montana

The central Montana Alkalic Province is located in the United States in central Montana. Montana is bordered by Idaho, Wyoming, North Dakota, South Dakota, and Canada to the north. Central Montana is unique when compared to the rest of the Rocky Mountains due to its east-west trend of tectonic features, including thrust fault zones, anticlines, and domes. The area of tectonic activity experienced conditions of plastic deformation, which affected the whole region. The Montana Alkalic Province consist of Cretaceous intrusions of monzonite and syenite as well as Cambrian limestone, sandstone, and siltstone. Most of the sedimentary rocks are a result of deposition from a terrestrial fluvial environment. Deposition included more than 13,000 feet of clastics that were later uplifted. The peak of this uplifting occurred during the Devonian. Deposition, uplift, and traps of carbonate shales have made central Montana prime for small-scale oil and gas production. Other geologic formations in this area include Judith Mountains, Crazy Mountains, Highwood Mountains, and Bears Paw Mountains. These areas include various igneous formations including xenoliths, laccoliths, and veins. Each mountain exhibits similar but unique geologic features.

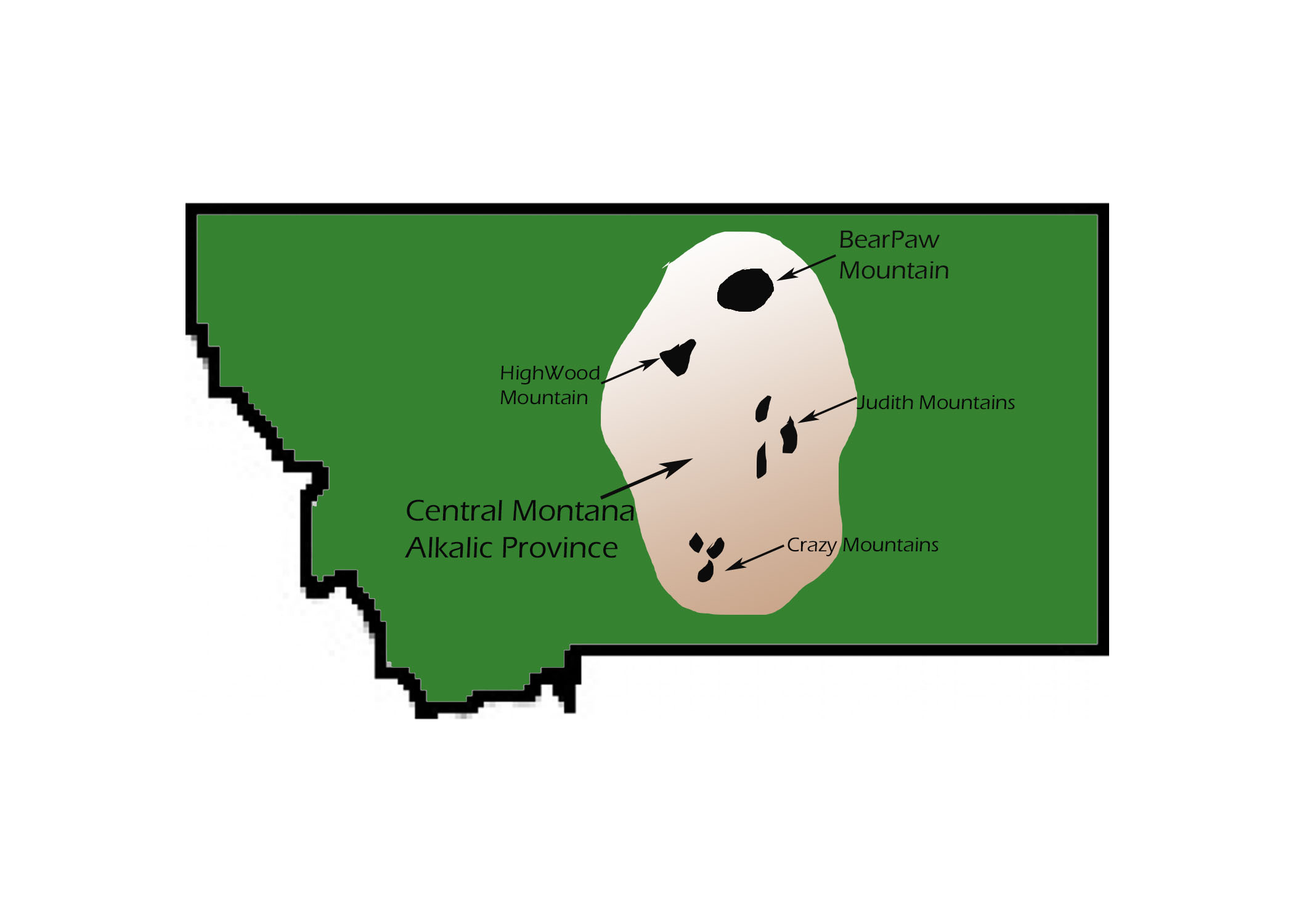
Central Montana Alkalic Province

== Members ==
=== Judith Mountains ===
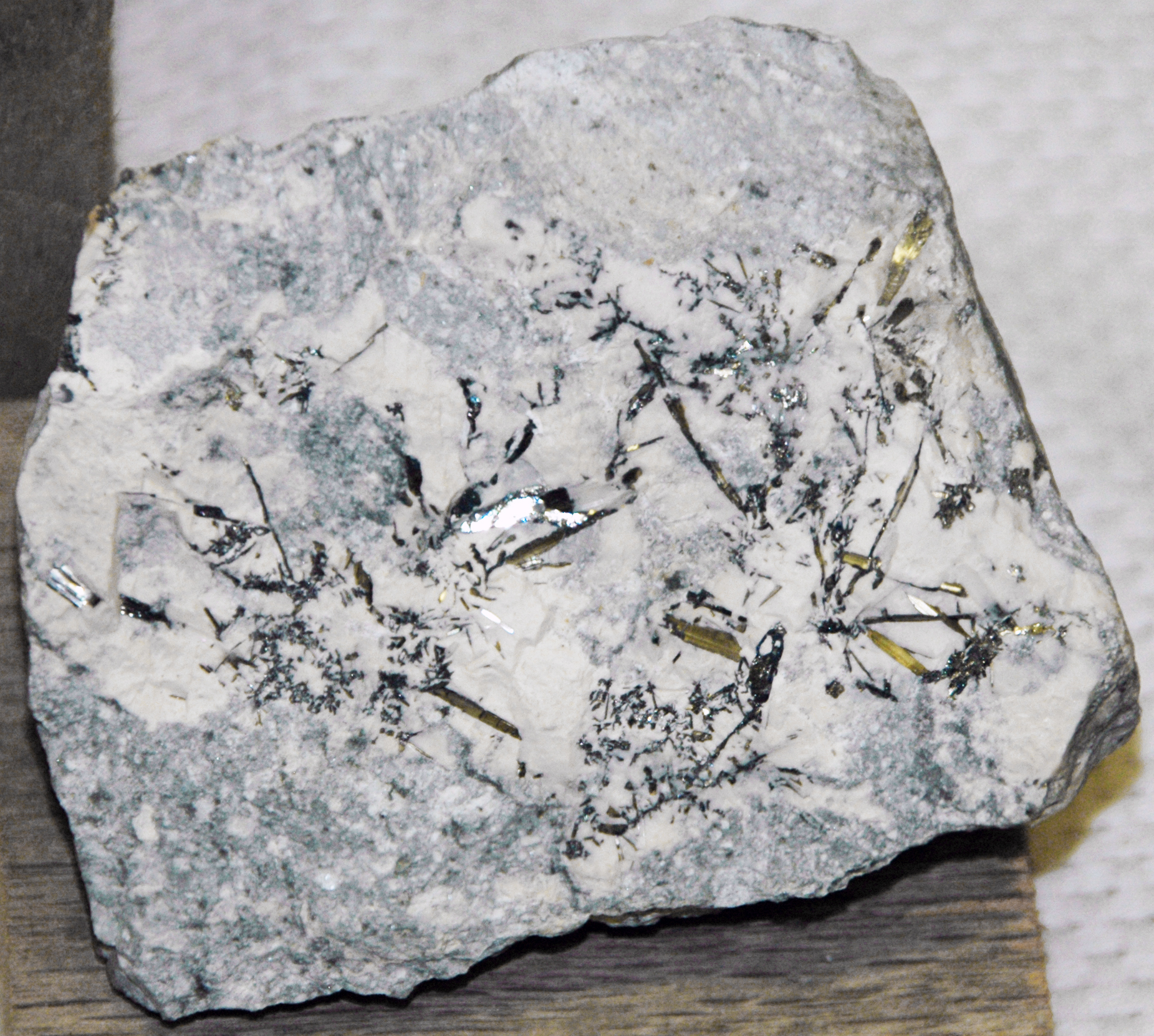

The Judith Mountains are located in north central Montana and is one of the nearest peaks of the Rocky Mountain front. They stretch eastward and in some areas such as Big Snowy Mountain, reach an elevation of around 8,600 feet. The Judith Mountains are different from a typical mountain range because they are not directly connected but rather are a group of peaks and summits. The Judith Mountains run about 18 miles long. They form an isolated, independent mountain group that was formed by a number of independent dome-shaped uplifts including laccoliths and other intrusive igneous rocks. The Judith Mountains range from Cambrian to Cretaceous in age. The Cambrian rocks consist of clay, silt, sand, and quartz. Later towards the Cretaceous, these sedimentary rocks were uplifted into anticlinal domes and broken apart by faults and then split up by molten bodies of rock. The Judith Mountains observe large sedimentary bodies including, shale, limestone, and sandstone often accompanied by large igneous intrusions. These igneous intrusions include granite, syenite, and phonolite.

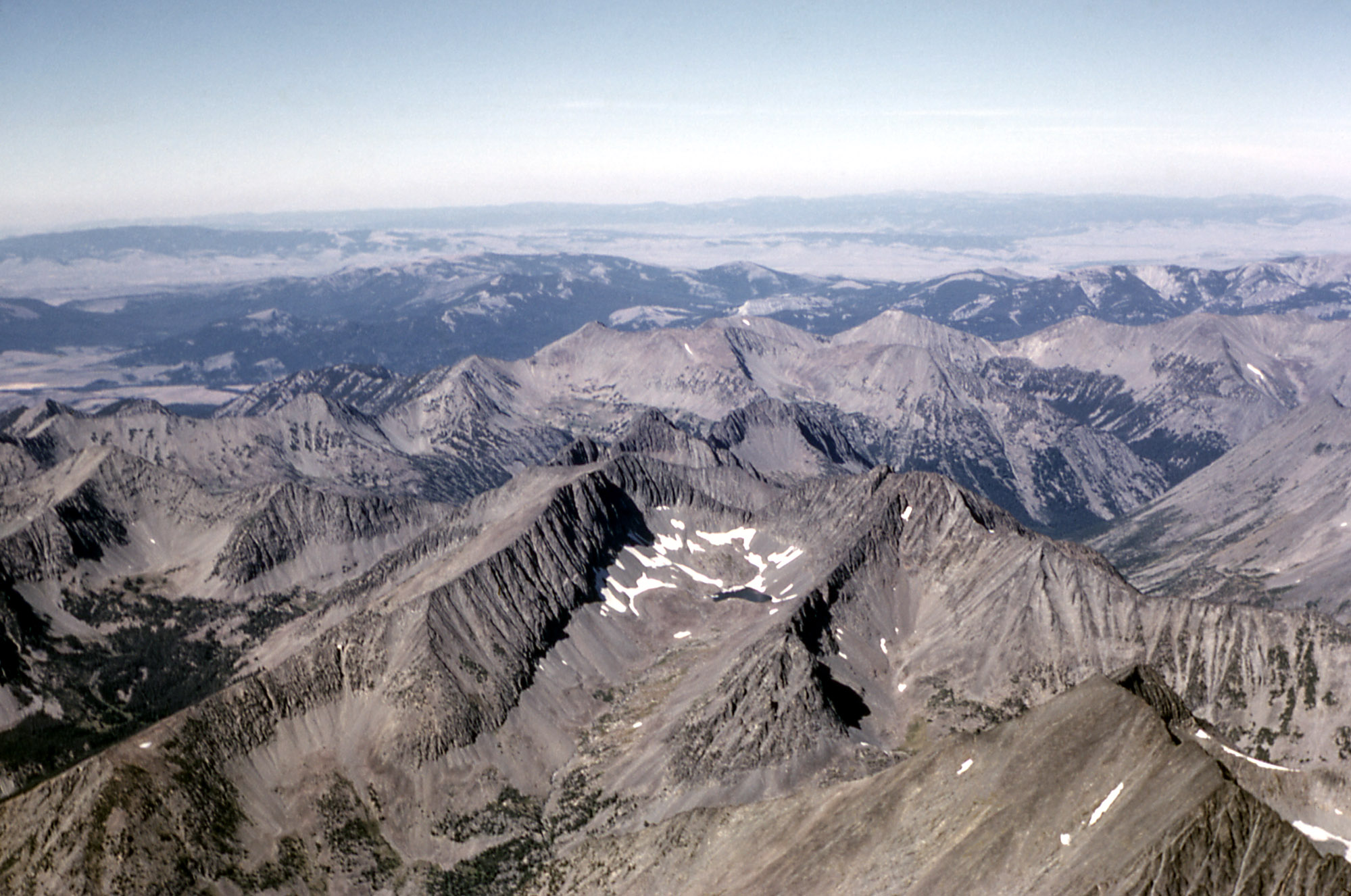
Crazy Mountains, Montana

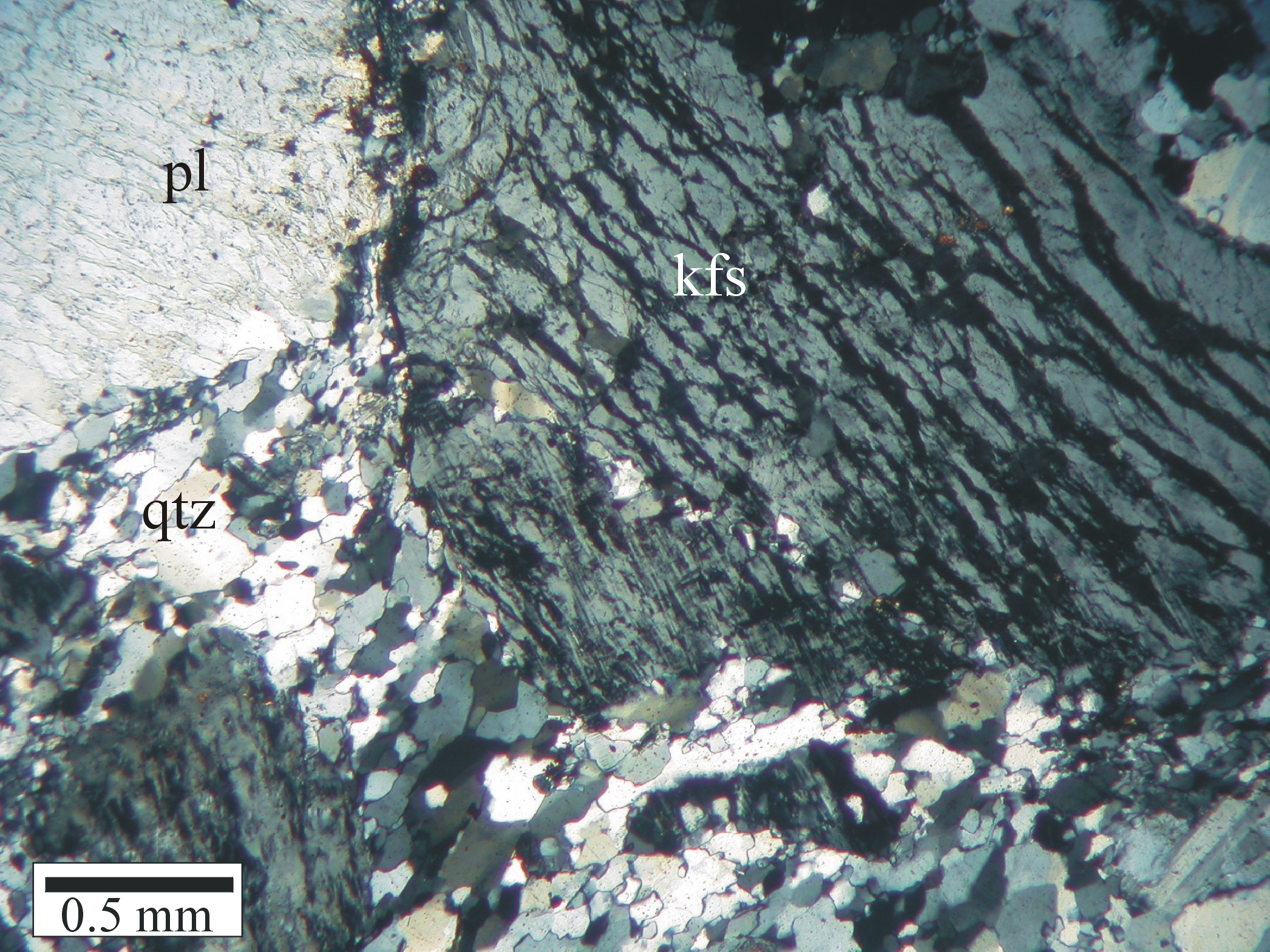
Granite Thin Section

=== Crazy Mountains ===
Crazy Mountains are a group of mountains that are located in the lower central Montana region. The structural basin is surrounded by the Castle Mountains, Shawmut anticlinal trend and the Huntley-Lake Basin fault-zone. The Crazy Mountains have assemblages of diorite, gabbro, and peridotite as a result from laccoliths, sills and dikes. This region's extensive subcontinental mantle is similar to mid-ocean ridge and ocean island basalt sources. The intrusions of the Crazy Mountains lie in a synclinal basin that observe minerals from around forty eight million years ago. The Crazy Mountains experience two distinct igneous settings that include mildly saturated or heavily saturated alkalic rocks. Both of these igneous series derive from mantle sources with mafic characteristics. These rocks are not a result from partial melting but rather derived from distinct source regions.

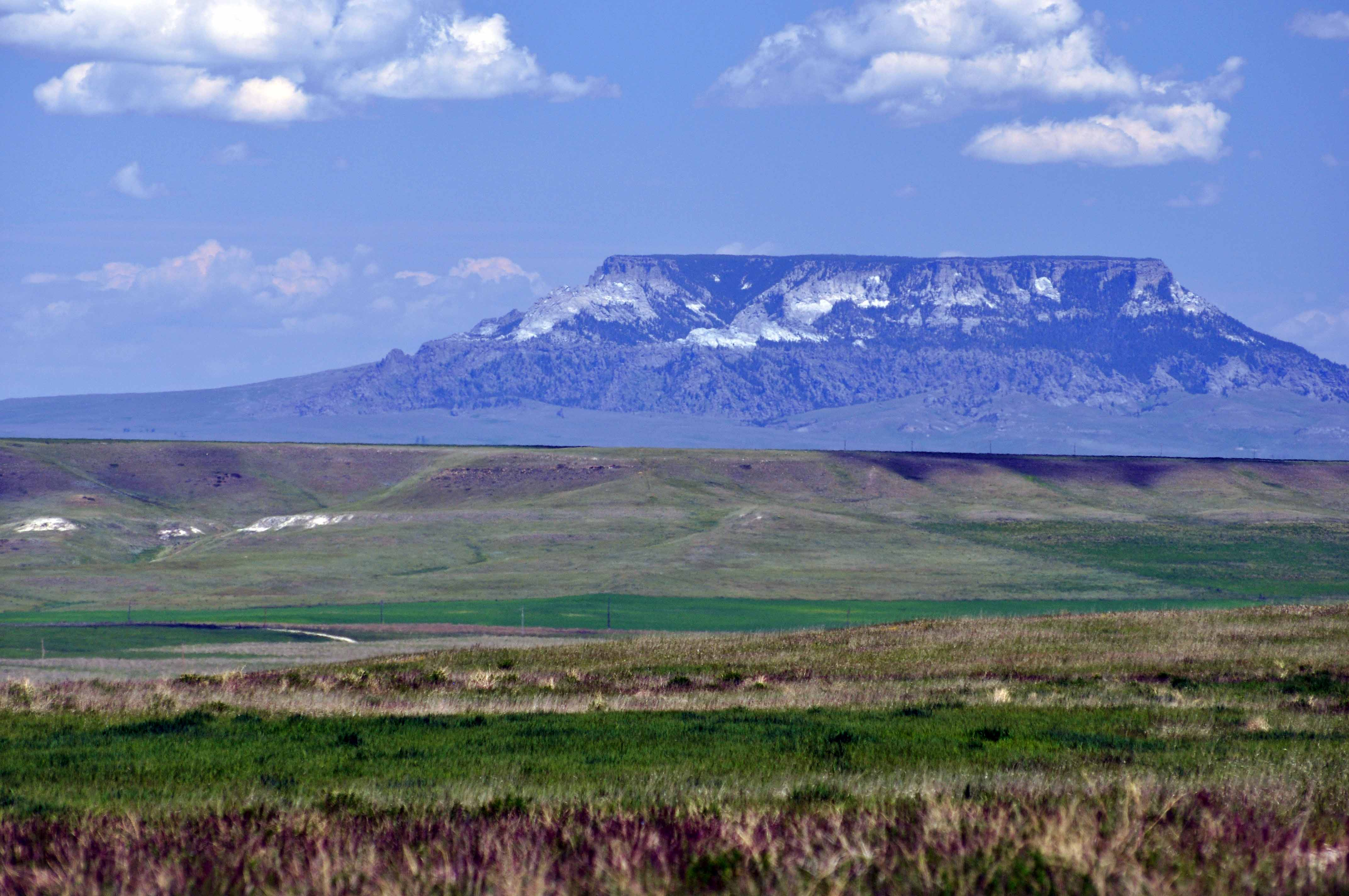
Highwood Mountain, Montana

=== Highwood Mountain ===
Highwood Mountain is located in Central Montana, North West of Judith Mountains. Highwood Mountain is part of the Wyoming craton and formed during the Eocene. The igneous rocks that formed here are derived from asthenosphere magmas that interacted with Archean mantle lithosphere. The various rock types that were produced here show evidence of shallow level degassing, fractional crystallization, and magma mixing. The main crystals present consist of olivine and latite. Geochemical data suggests fractional crystallization of olivine and micas that were accompanied by large-scale mixing of magmas. Highwood Mountain consist of four laccoliths that are very similar. The key difference is variation of percentages in the minerals present and one of the four laccoliths experiences a different order of layers of mafic minerals.

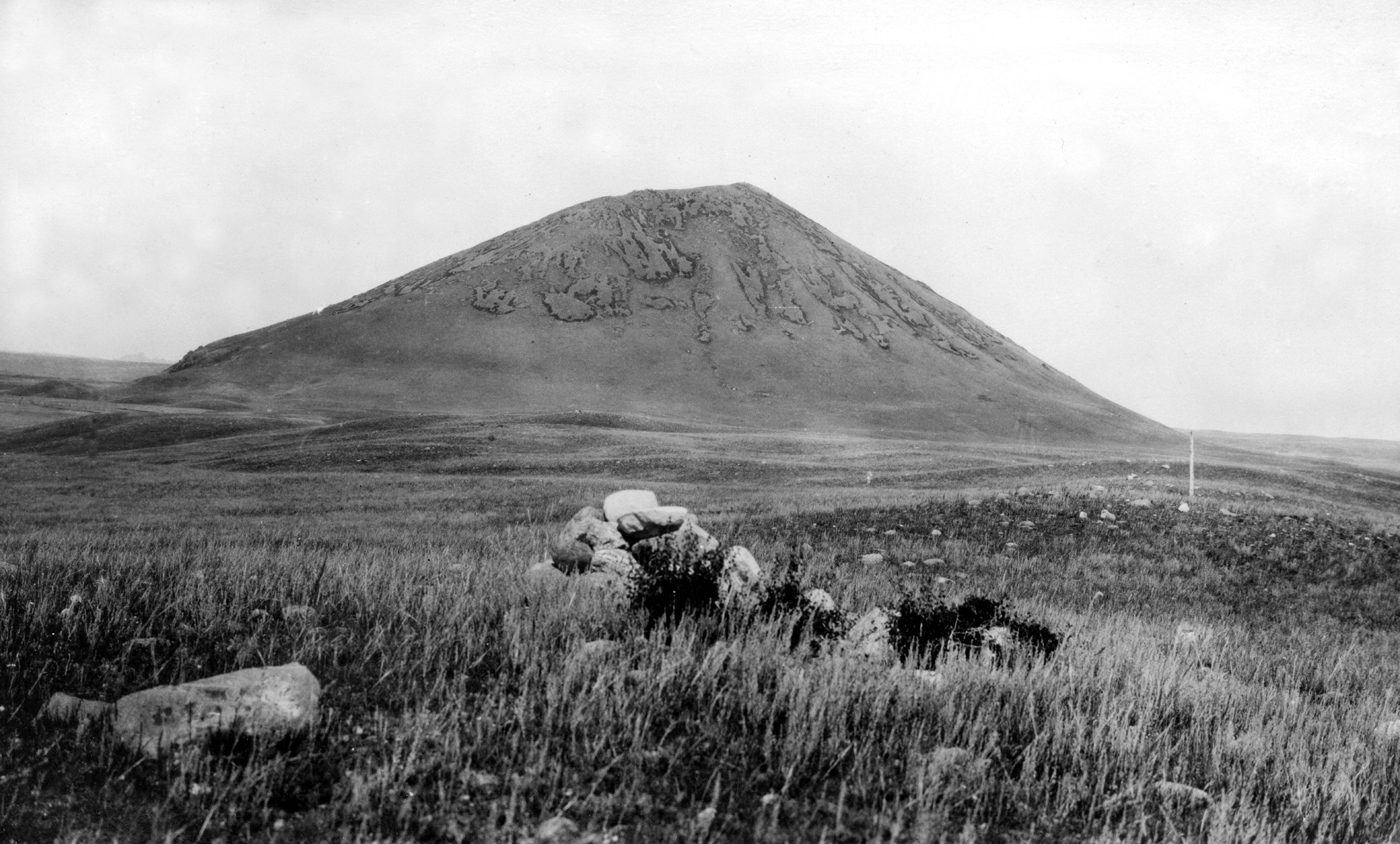
Bearpaw, Montana.

=== Bearpaw Mountain ===
Bearpaw Mountain is located in North Central Montana. It is located on a volcanic field that also shows evidence of ultramafic xenoliths. Bearpaw Mountain is mostly dominated by olivine and micas that have mostly coarse and granular texture. Just like Highwood Mountain, Bearpaw Mountain is part of the Wyoming craton and derived from the lower lithosphere. The mineralogy consist of spinel peridotites and pyroxenes. The spinel peridotites give good representation of the craton mantle. These minerals on average have experienced up to 30% partial melting while at the mantle source. Petrographic evidence suggest three different ways re-enrichment occurred. One being silicate melts forming mica and clinopyroxene veins. Another being growth of micas from potassium rich fluids. Lastly, interactions with fluids to form orthopyroxene porphyroblasts and orthopyroxene veins.

== History ==
Central Montana Alkalic Province became popularized in the oil industry in the early 1900s. The Ohio Oil Company was the first company to create a permanent oil field in central Montana. This was accomplished by exploring the Elk Basin from Wyoming into central Montana.
