= Benton Lake National Wildlife Refuge =

Protected area in Montana, United States

- IUCN category IV (habitat/species management area)
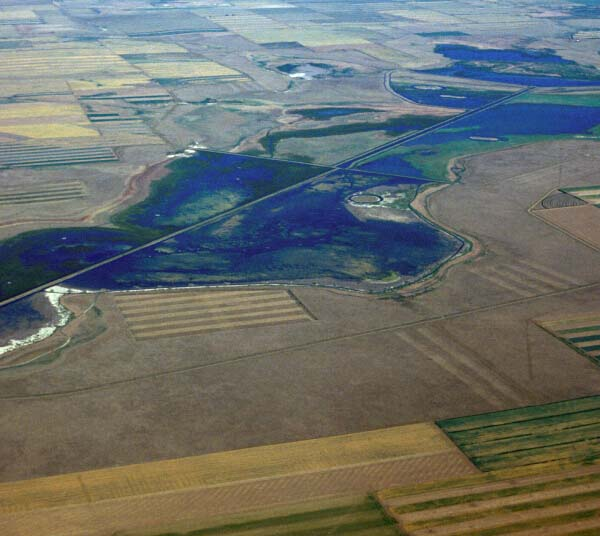
- Aerial view of Benton Lake

- Location within the United States
- Location: Cascade County, Montana, USA
- Nearest city: Great Falls, MT
- Coordinates: 47°39′57″N 111°19′59″W
- Area: 12,459 acres (50.42 km^{2})
- Established: 1929
- Governing body: U.S. Fish and Wildlife Service
- Website: Benton Lake National Wildlife Refuge

Benton Lake National Wildlife Refuge is a 12,459-acre (5,042 ha) National Wildlife Refuge (NWR) in the central part of the U.S. state of Montana.

== Location ==
It lies in northern Cascade County, 12 mi (19 km) north of the city of Great Falls, Montana. Benton Lake NWR includes, Benton Lake, shortgrass prairie and seasonal wetlands, and is nearly surrounded by the Highwood Mountains to the east, Big Belt Mountains to the south, and the Rocky Mountains to the west. Benton Lake NWR is on the western edge of the northern Great Plains and much of the shallow lake is a 6,000-acre (2,400 ha) wetland.

Benton Lake NWR is the centerpiece of the Benton Lake NWR Complex, which includes Swan Valley Conservation Area, Swan Valley National Wildlife Refuge, Benton Lake Wetland Management District, Blackfoot Valley Conservation Area and the Rocky Mountain Front Conservation Area. The complex encompasses an area of 163,304 acres (66,087 ha) and the headquarters is located in Great Falls, Montana.

== Ecology ==
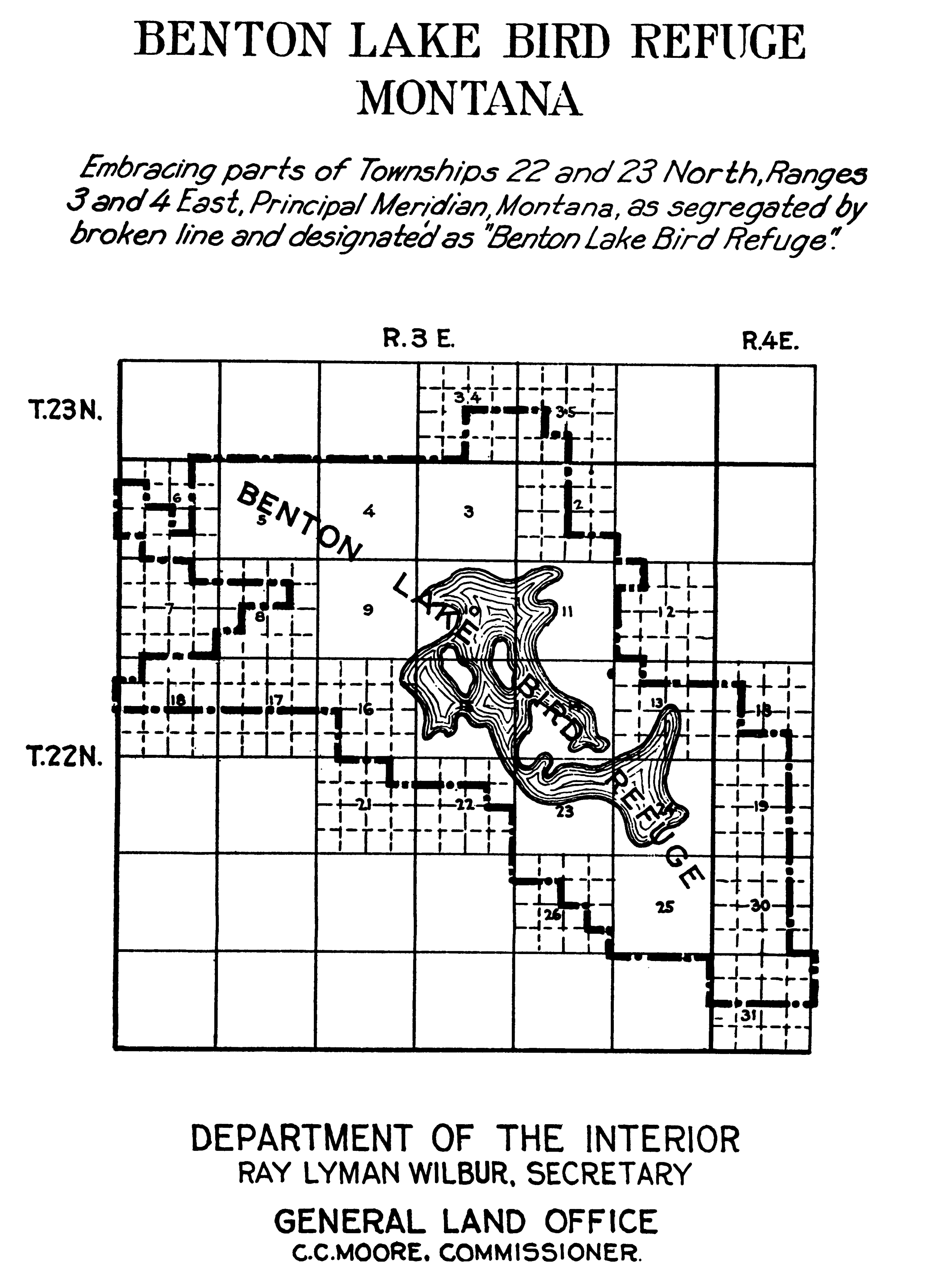
1929 illustration of the area of the bird refuge area

During spring and fall migrations, up to 150,000 ducks, 2,500 Canada geese, 40,000 snow geese, 5,000 tundra swans, and perhaps as many as 50,000 shorebirds use the marsh. On average, 20,000 ducks are produced yearly, while colonies of Franklin's gulls may contain more than 10,000 nests. Shorebirds such as avocets, phalaropes, willets are commonly seen as are diving birds like the grebe. Raptors including bald eagles, golden eagle, prairie falcon, and peregrine falcon have been spotted as well. Of the approximately 240 species of birds recorded on the refuge, nearly 90 are known to nest here. The prairie sections of the refuge provide habitat for burrowing owls and sharp-tailed grouse.

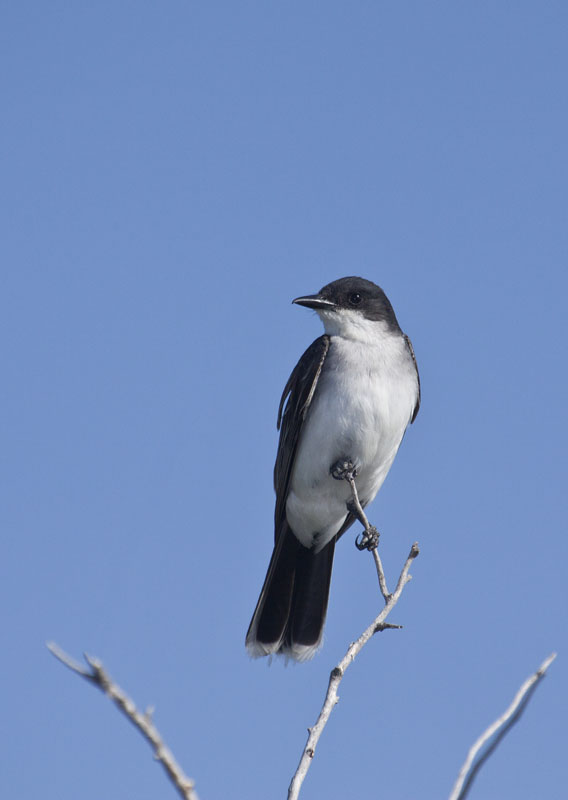
An eastern kingbird at Benton Lake, 2011

Other Refuge wildlife includes 28 different species of mammals including coyote, muskrat, badger, white-tailed deer, mule deer, and pronghorn.
