= Sweet Grass Creek =

Location
- Country: Park and Sweet Grass County, Montana

Physical characteristics
- Source
  - coordinates: 46°05′52″N 110°20′04″W
  - elevation: 3,904 feet (1,190 m)
- Mouth
  - coordinates: 45°47′10″N 109°47′23″W

Basin features
- River system: Yellowstone River

Sweet Grass Creek is a tributary of the Yellowstone River, approximately 50 mi (80 km) long, in south central Montana in the United States.

It rises in the Gallatin National Forest, in the Crazy Mountains in eastern Park County. It flows northeast, into Sweet Grass County, then southeast, past Melville, and south, joining the Yellowstone 2 mi (3 km) northwest of Greycliff.

== Variant names ==
Sweet Grass Creek has also been known as: Otter River.

== See also ==
- List of rivers of Montana
- Montana Stream Access Law
