= Highwood Mountains =

Mountain range in Montana, United States

Coordinates: 47°27′47″N 110°33′39″W

The Highwood Mountains are an island range (sub-range of the Rockies entirely surrounded by prairie) which cover approximately 4,659 km^{2} (1,799 sq mi) of the Central Montana Alkalic Province in north central Montana in the U.S. They are in Chouteau, Judith Basin and Cascade counties and lie east of Great Falls and Benton Lake National Wildlife Refuge, at the northern end of the Lewis and Clark National Forest. The mountains were included in Highwood Mountains National Forest until 1908, when the unit became part of Lewis and Clark National Forest.

Nearby are Highwood, Montana, and the Missouri River above the mouth of the Marias River. The highest point in the Highwood Mountains is Highwood Baldy at 2338 meters (7670 ft).

The area is an Eocene volcanic complex and is rich in potash. Many of the extrusive rocks and some of the dike rocks contain abundant phenocrysts of a clear analcime that appears to be primary. Pseudoleucite is an abundant constituent of many of the igneous rocks. They have yielded high quality sapphires. The Shonkin Sag, a glacial meltwater channel, borders the Highwood Mountains to the north.

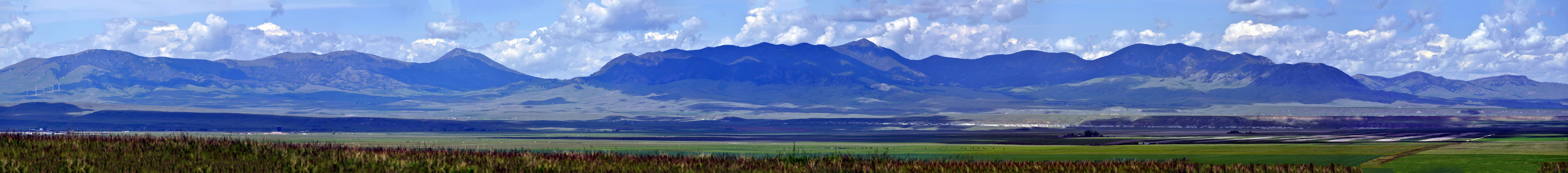
Southern face of Highwood Mountains

A dense stream network crosses the mountains. Riparian areas are rich with willow, dogwood, water birch, cottonwood and other water-loving plants. The land cover is a mosaic of conifers, deciduous trees, grass, and rock.

== See also ==
- List of mountain ranges in Montana
