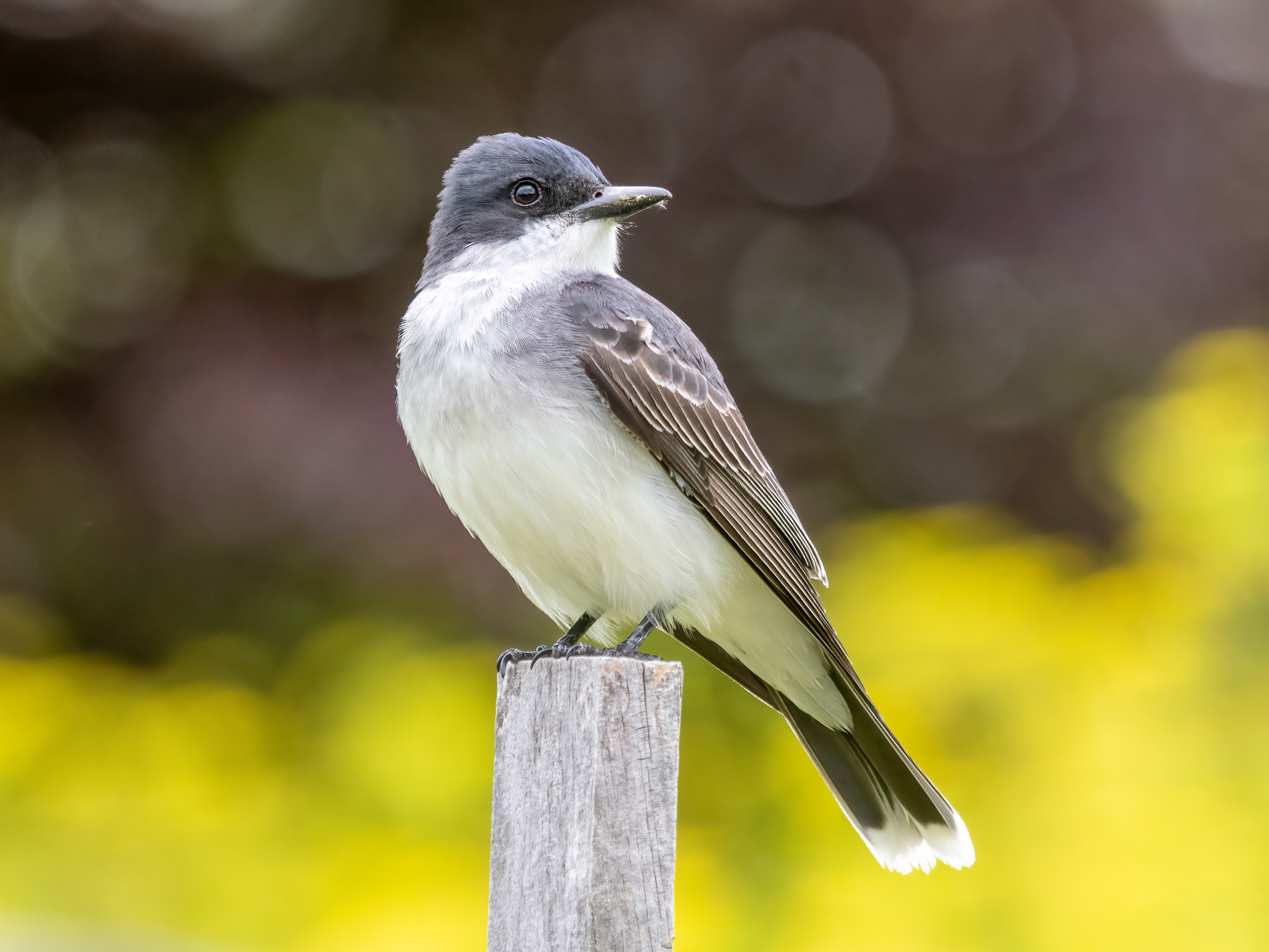
- Adult

Conservation status
- Least Concern (IUCN 3.1)

Scientific classification
- Kingdom: Animalia
- Phylum: Chordata
- Class: Aves
- Order: Passeriformes
- Family: Tyrannidae
- Genus: Tyrannus
- Species: T. tyrannus

Binomial name
- Tyrannus tyrannus (Linnaeus, 1758)
- T. tyrannus range Breeding range Wintering range Migration

Synonyms
- Lanius tyrannus Linnaeus, 1758

Audio
- Call

= Eastern kingbird =

Species of bird

The eastern kingbird (Tyrannus tyrannus) is a large tyrant flycatcher native to the Americas. The bird is predominantly dark gray with white underbelly and pointed wings. Eastern kingbirds are conspicuous and are commonly found in open areas with scattered trees and bushes, where they perch while foraging for insects. The eastern kingbird is migratory, with its breeding range spread across North America and its wintering range in Central and South America.

== Taxonomy ==
The eastern kingbird was described by the Swedish naturalist Carl Linnaeus in 1758 in the tenth edition of his Systema Naturae under the binomial name of Lanius tyrannus. The present genus Tyrannus was introduced in 1799 by the French naturalist Bernard Germain de Lacépède with the eastern kingbird as the type species. The species is monotypic; no subspecies are recognised.

== Description ==
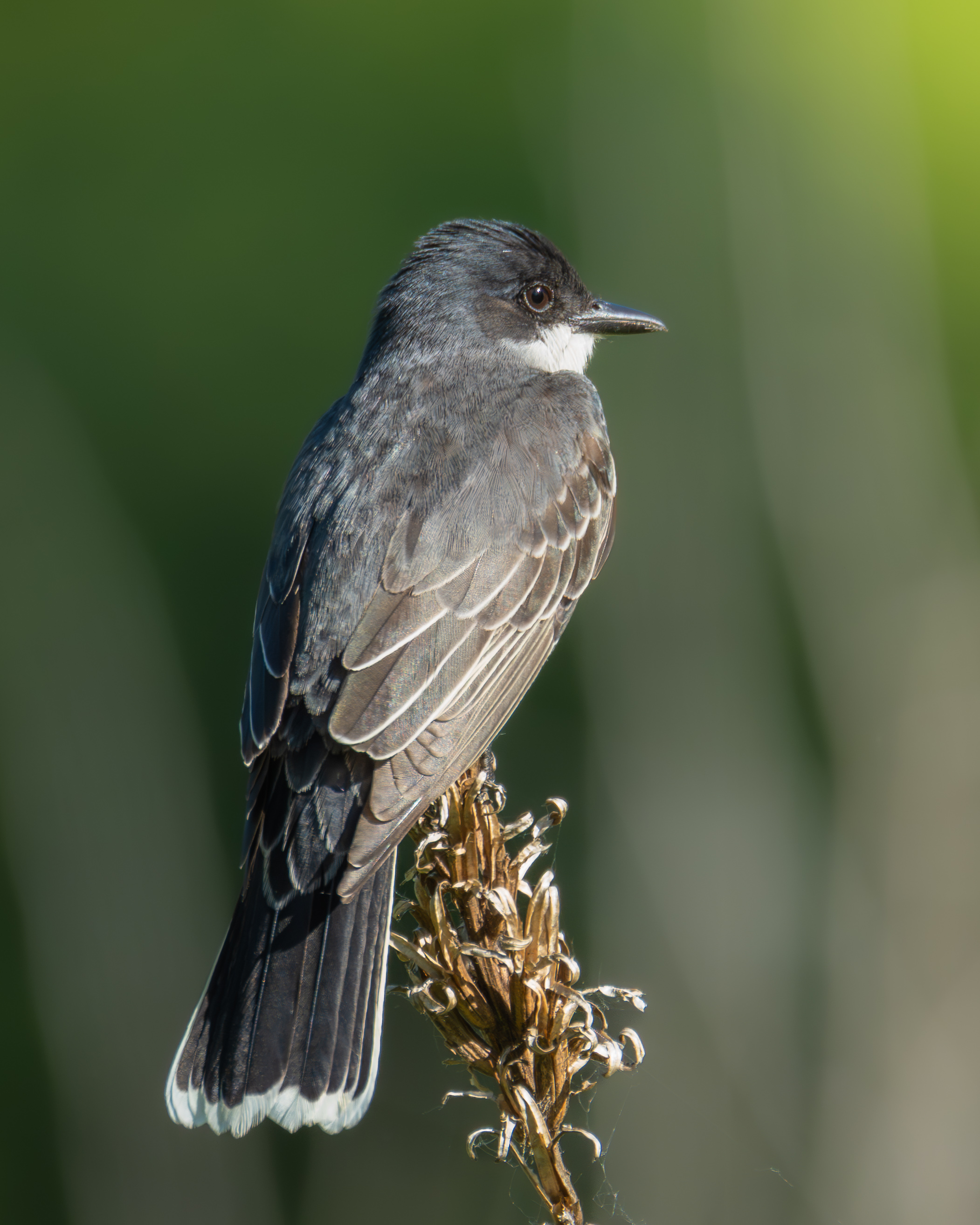
Adult kingbird (back)

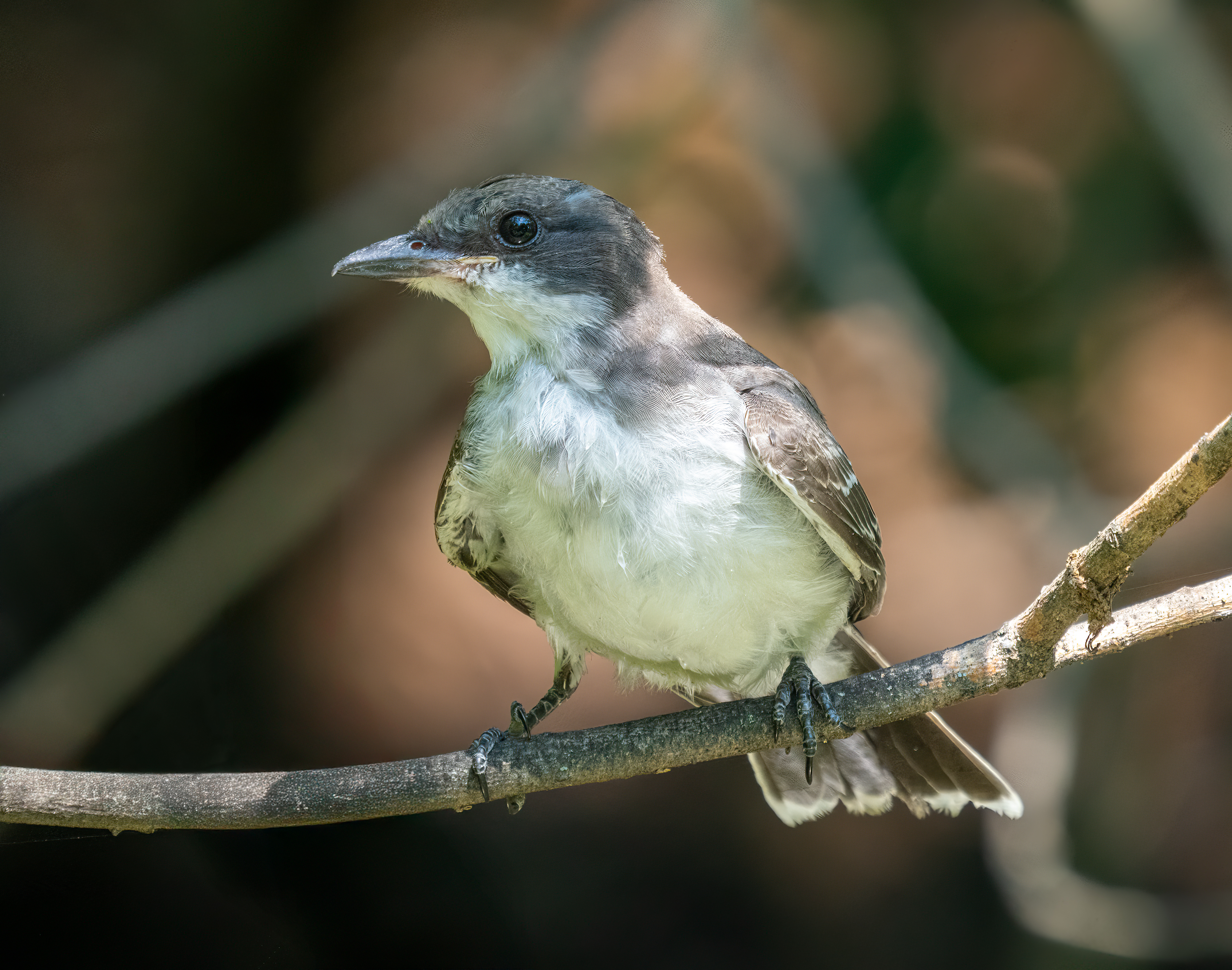
Juvenile eastern kingbird

Adults are grey-black on the upperparts with light underparts; they have a long black tail with a white end and long, pointed wings. They have a red patch on their crown, seldom seen. They are of average size for a kingbird, at 19–23 cm (7.5–9.1 in), 33–38 cm (13–15 in) across the wings and weighing 33–55 g (1.2–1.9 oz).

The call is a high-pitched, buzzing and unmusical chirp, frequently compared to an electric fence.

== Distribution and range ==
Their breeding habitat is open areas across North America. They make a sturdy cup nest in a tree or shrub, sometimes on top of a stump or pole. These birds aggressively defend their territory, even against much larger birds.

These birds migrate in flocks to South America. There are three European records, all from the British Isles: two from Ireland in October 2012 and September 2013, and one from Scotland in September 2016.

== Behavior ==
=== Breeding ===
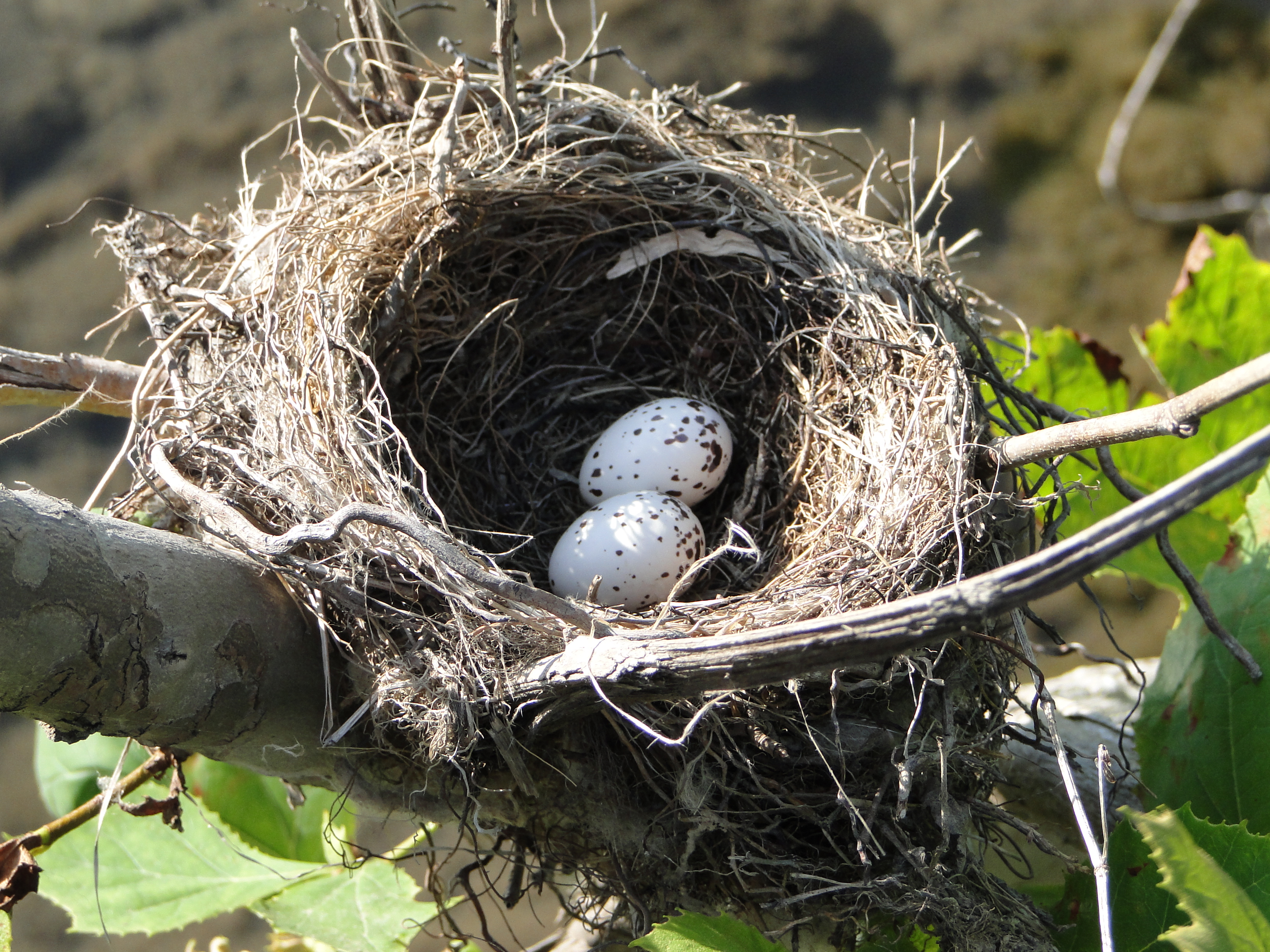
Nest and eggs

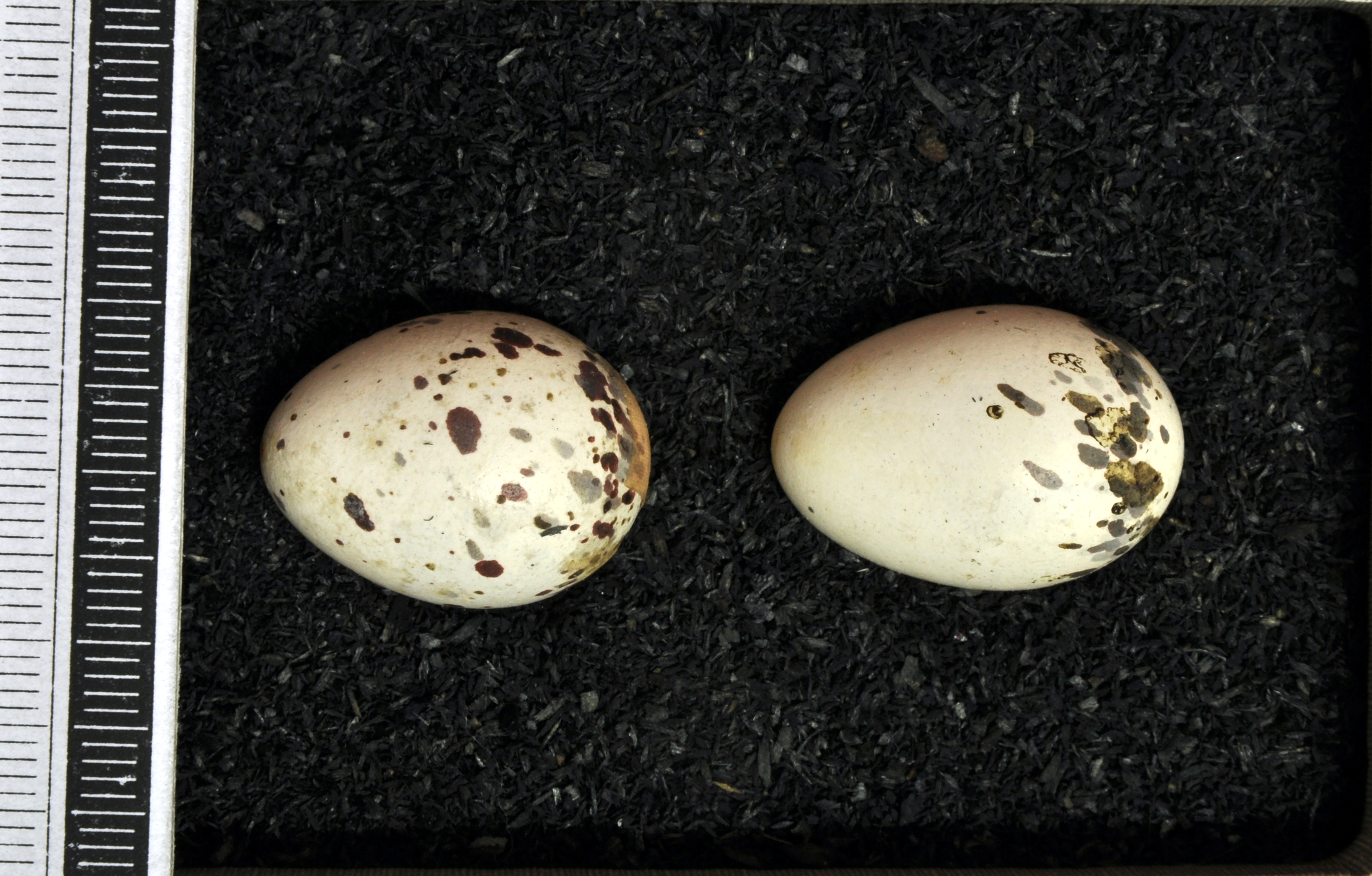
Eggs, Collection Museum Wiesbaden

Some eastern kingbirds place their nests in the open, while others hide their nests well. Eastern kingbirds in southern British Columbia may nest in open fields, in shrubs over open water, high up in trees, and even in the tops of small stumps. Both male and female participate in nest defense, but females may stay on well-hidden nests longer than females with open nests, who may leave nests earlier to chase away predators. Those pairs nesting in the open may be able to see predators coming earlier and rely on aggressive behavior to protect their young.

The aggressive mobbing behavior of eastern kingbirds has been shown to keep ravens and crows from finding experimental nests placed near kingbird nests. Similar experimental nests placed further from the kingbird nests were more likely to be spotted by crows and ravens. Blue jays, American crows, squirrels, and tree-climbing snakes are on occasion kingbird nest predators. American kestrels likely prey on the adults.

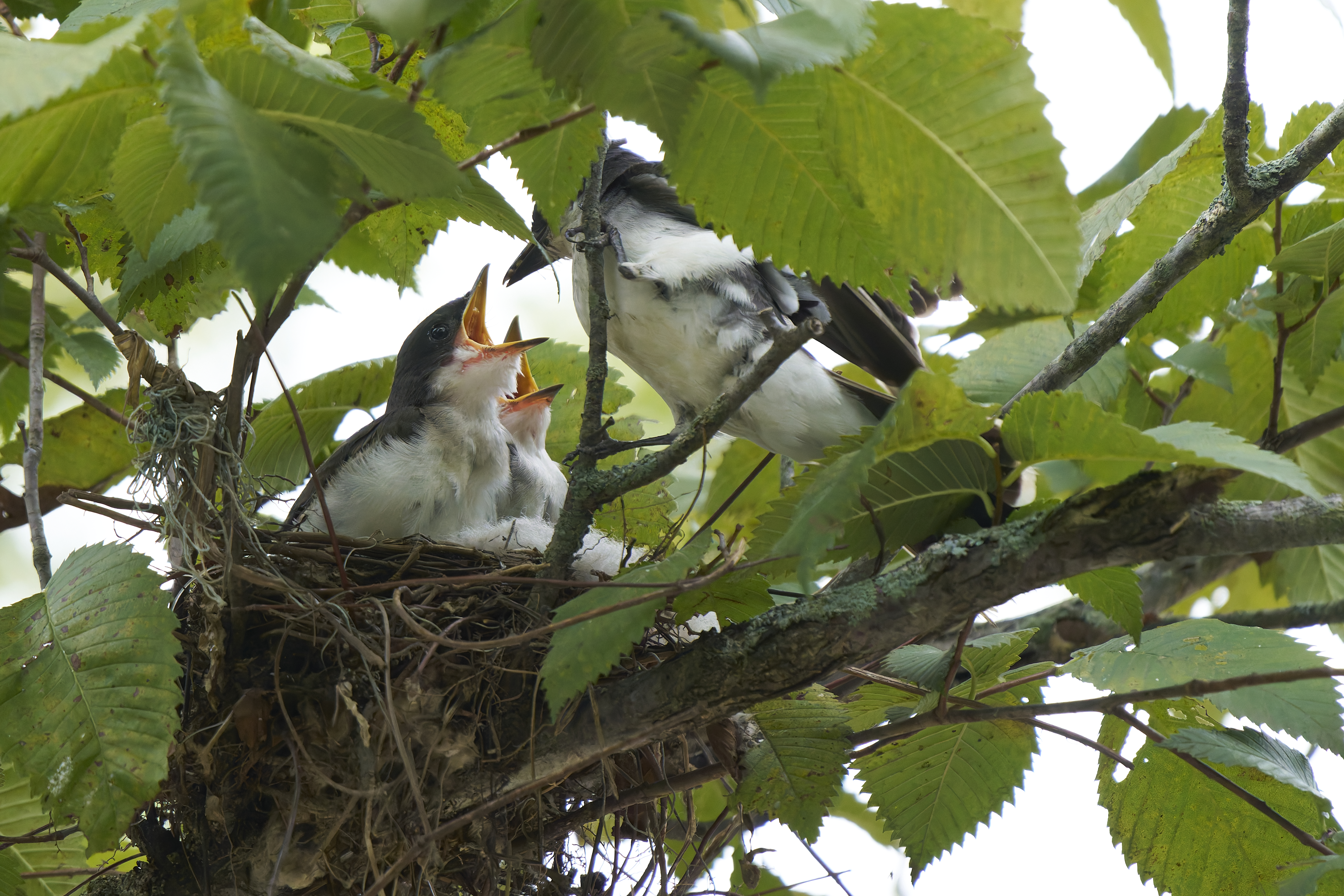
Adult feeding two nestlings

=== Food and feeding ===
Hovering over water in search of insects

Eastern kingbirds wait on an open perch and fly out to catch insects in flight, sometimes hovering to pick prey off vegetation. They also eat berries and fruit, mainly in their wintering areas.
