= South Moccasin Mountains =

Mountain range in Fergus County, Montana, United States

- Location within Montana

Highest point
- Elevation: 4,951 ft (1,509 m)
- Coordinates: 47°10′21″N 109°31′26″W

Geography
- Country: United States
- State: Montana

The South Moccasin Mountains, el. 4,951 feet (1,509 m), is a small mountain range northwest of Lewistown, Montana in Fergus County, Montana. The highest point is South Peak at 5,420 feet.

While fully separate ranges, the North Moccasin Mountains and South Moccasin Mountains are sometimes referred to collectively as the Moccasin Mountains.

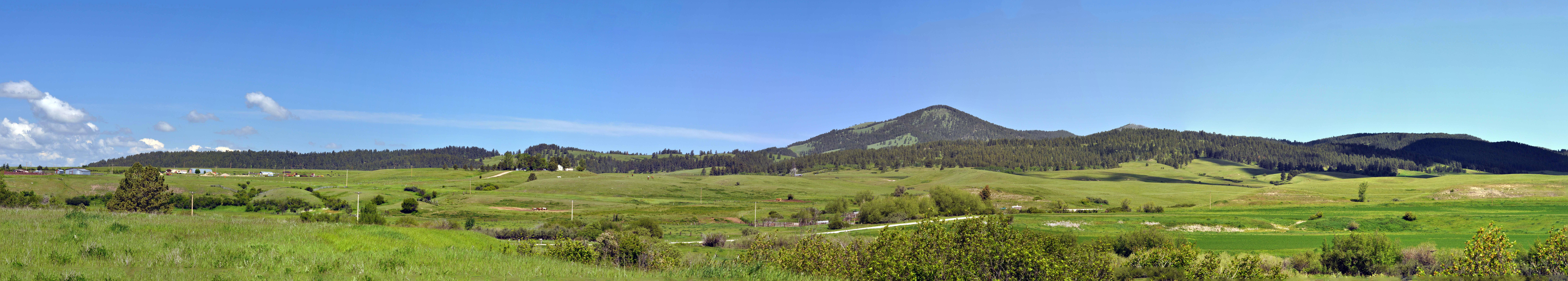
Southern face of South Moccasin Mountains

== See also ==
- List of mountain ranges in Montana
