= Judith Mountains =

Mountains located in Central Montana

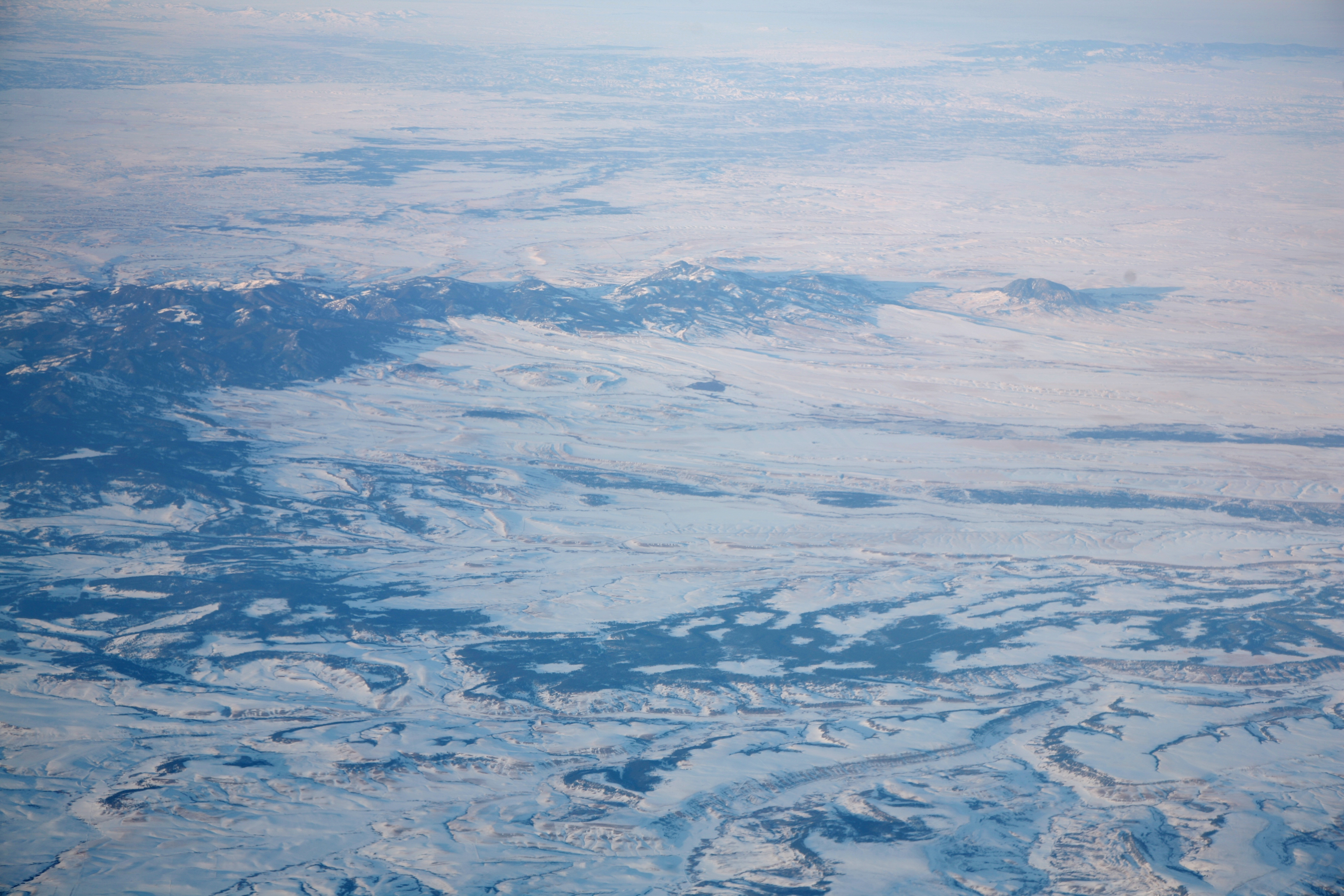
- The Judith Mountains in winter

Highest point
- Peak: Judith Peak
- Elevation: 6,428 ft (1,959 m)
- Coordinates: 47°13′08″N 109°13′43″W

Geography
- Country: United States
- State: Montana
- Parent range: Rocky Mountains

The Judith Mountains are located in central Montana in the Central Montana Alkalic Province in Fergus County, just to the northeast of Lewistown, Montana.

Judith Peak is the highest summit of this range, with an elevation of 6,428 feet (1,959 m).

== History ==
To the southeast of Judith Peak lies the remains of Fort Maginnis. Fort Maginnis was built in 1880 to protect the cattle ranches, the gold mining camps in and around the Judith Mountains and the Carroll Trail. The fort was constructed following the battle of the Little Bighorn.

In 1879, Granville Stuart and his friend Samuel T. Hauser along with Helena banker Andrew J. Davis established the Davis, Hauser and Stuart (DHS) cattle company. Stuart was made the general manager of the DHS brand and Stuart located the ranch headquarters on 800 acres (320 ha) on the southern slopes of the Judith Mountains near Flat Willow Creek. The DHS Ranch was one of the largest open range cattle operations in the Central Montana prairie in the 1880s.

== Mining and geology ==
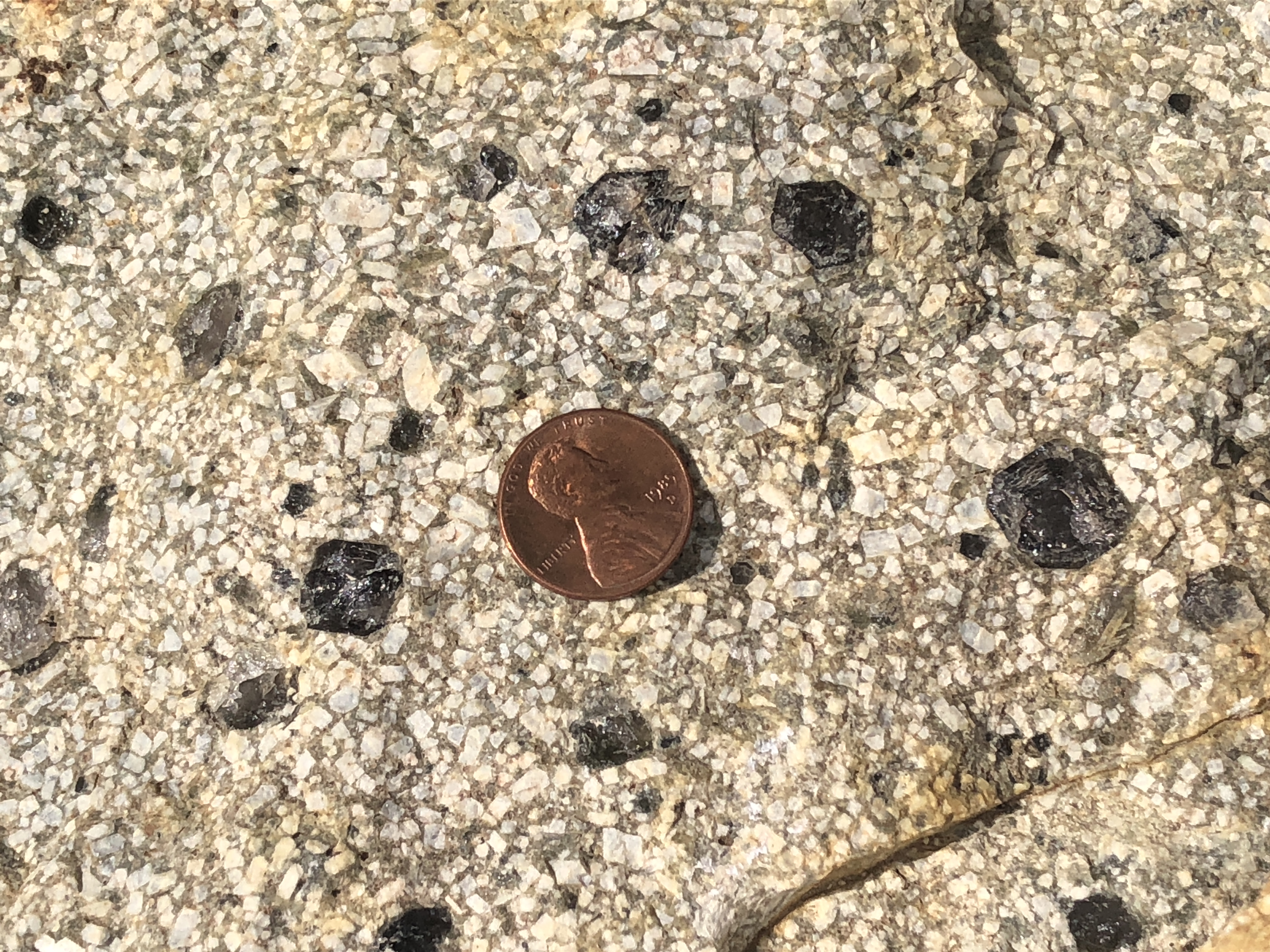
Double-terminated quartz from Judith Peak.

The geology of the range includes limestone, sandstone, and siltstone of Cambrian to Cretaceous age which were intruded by alkaline intrusives of monzonite, syenite to tinguaite composition of Cretaceous to Tertiary age. Epithermal gold and silver veins are found along the intrusive contacts.

The mountains were the center of gold and silver mining in the 1800s and current exploration continues. The old mining camps of Maiden and Gilt Edge were built during the mining boom in the 1880s and 1890s.

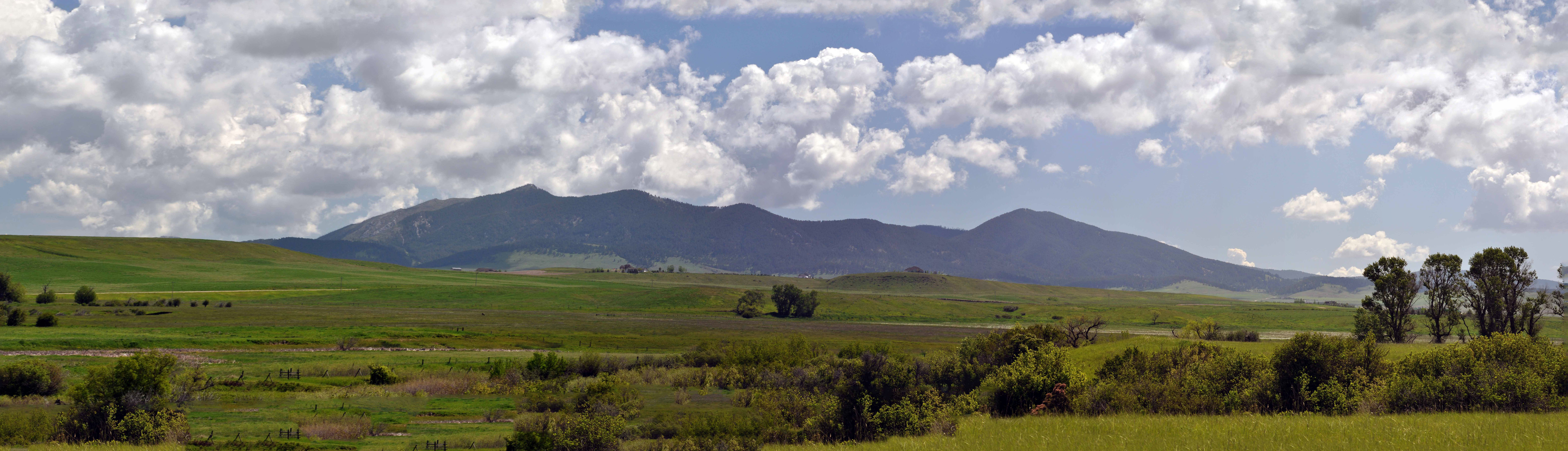
Southwest flank of the Judith Mountains from Big Spring Creek

== See also ==
- List of mountain ranges in Montana
