= North Moccasin Mountains =

Mountain range in Montana, US

- Location within Montana

Highest point
- Elevation: 5,384 ft (1,641 m)
- Coordinates: 47°17′47″N 109°29′06″W

Geography
- Country: United States
- State: Montana

The North Moccasin Mountains, el. 5,384 feet (1,641 m), is a small mountain range northwest of Hilger, Montana in Fergus County, Montana. The highest peak is 5,581 feet.

While fully separate ranges, the South Moccasin Mountains and North Moccasin Mountains are sometimes referred to collectively as the Moccasin Mountains.

The ghost town of Kendall and abandoned mines remain as part of the gold mining past of the mountains.

== See also ==
- List of mountain ranges in Montana
