= List of mountains in Beaverhead County, Montana =

There are at least 158 named mountains in Beaverhead County, Montana.

- Ajax Peak, 45°19′52″N 113°44′19″W, el. 9,934 feet (3,028 m)
- Alder Peak, 45°44′28″N 113°09′03″W, el. 9,180 feet (2,800 m)
- Alturas Number One Mountain, 45°22′38″N 113°01′31″W, el. 10,062 feet (3,067 m)
- Alturas Number Two Mountain, 45°23′39″N 113°00′34″W, el. 10,469 feet (3,191 m)
- Antelope Peak, 44°40′57″N 112°01′28″W, el. 8,274 feet (2,522 m)
- Antone Peak, 44°46′48″N 112°10′26″W, el. 10,213 feet (3,113 m)
- Armstrong Mountain, 45°23′31″N 112°52′21″W, el. 8,455 feet (2,577 m)
- Arrowhead Mountain, 44°34′42″N 111°39′36″W, el. 6,936 feet (2,114 m)
- Bachelor Mountain, 45°04′09″N 113°09′09″W, el. 7,539 feet (2,298 m)
- Baldy Mountain, 45°21′21″N 113°01′34″W, el. 10,535 feet (3,211 m)
- Barb Mountain, 45°28′56″N 112°56′45″W, el. 10,466 feet (3,190 m)
- Barbour Hill, 45°35′14″N 112°57′02″W, el. 9,764 feet (2,976 m)
- Battle Mountain, 45°39′49″N 113°40′34″W, el. 7,575 feet (2,309 m)
- Beals Mountain, 45°36′18″N 112°50′37″W, el. 8,976 feet (2,736 m)
- Bender Point, 45°46′56″N 113°42′53″W, el. 8,412 feet (2,564 m)
- Benson Peak, 45°07′12″N 112°27′54″W, el. 8,474 feet (2,583 m)
- Big Point, 45°34′22″N 113°06′24″W, el. 7,241 feet (2,207 m)
- Black Lion Mountain, 45°37′46″N 112°59′16″W, el. 10,390 feet (3,170 m)
- Black Mountain, 45°10′23″N 113°28′01″W, el. 9,176 feet (2,797 m)
- Black Mountain, 45°20′21″N 113°00′10″W, el. 9,331 feet (2,844 m)
- Blacktail Mountains, 44°59′09″N 112°34′44″W, el. 9,459 feet (2,883 m)
- Bloody Dick Peak, 45°09′12″N 113°19′22″W, el. 9,790 feet (2,980 m)
- Bobcat Mountain, 45°37′09″N 113°13′55″W, el. 9,134 feet (2,784 m)
- Boner Knob, 45°44′07″N 112°57′57″W, el. 7,598 feet (2,316 m)
- Brays Butte, 44°36′17″N 111°37′58″W, el. 7,349 feet (2,240 m)
- Brownes Peak, 45°33′48″N 112°53′04″W, el. 8,802 feet (2,683 m)
- Browns Peak, 45°10′07″N 113°16′10″W, el. 8,970 feet (2,730 m)
- Burns Mountain, 45°08′55″N 112°50′03″W, el. 6,745 feet (2,056 m)
- Butch Hill, 45°21′07″N 113°18′44″W, el. 8,150 feet (2,480 m)
- Butch Hill, 45°22′33″N 113°19′14″W, el. 7,858 feet (2,395 m)
- Call Mountain, 45°29′37″N 112°51′40″W, el. 8,976 feet (2,736 m)
- Calvert Hill, 45°51′02″N 113°10′07″W, el. 7,772 feet (2,369 m)
- Camp Mountain, 45°30′07″N 113°19′49″W, el. 8,730 feet (2,660 m)
- Canyon Mountain, 45°21′51″N 112°48′42″W, el. 7,454 feet (2,272 m)
- Carroll Hill, 45°19′43″N 113°14′28″W, el. 7,411 feet (2,259 m)
- Center Mountain, 45°13′45″N 113°38′49″W, el. 10,207 feet (3,111 m)
- Cleve Mountain, 45°36′44″N 112°55′30″W, el. 9,498 feet (2,895 m)
- Comet Mountain, 45°27′35″N 113°02′38″W, el. 10,216 feet (3,114 m)
- Deer Mountain, 44°39′27″N 111°34′01″W, el. 8,399 feet (2,560 m)
- Deer Peak, 45°29′31″N 113°20′13″W, el. 9,170 feet (2,800 m)
- Diamond Butte, 44°33′15″N 112°25′11″W, el. 7,398 feet (2,255 m)
- Dixon Mountain, 44°41′49″N 112°46′03″W, el. 9,600 feet (2,900 m)
- Dry Hill, 45°03′20″N 112°39′45″W, el. 7,326 feet (2,233 m)
- Dutchman Mountain, 45°19′43″N 112°47′46″W, el. 7,310 feet (2,230 m)
- Eighteenmile Peak, 44°26′53″N 112°59′46″W, el. 10,971 feet (3,344 m)
- Elk Mountain, 44°39′27″N 111°36′33″W, el. 8,133 feet (2,479 m)
- Elk Mountain, 44°45′35″N 113°08′15″W, el. 10,167 feet (3,099 m)
- Ellis Peak, 44°44′56″N 112°59′58″W, el. 9,688 feet (2,953 m)
- Foolhen Mountain, 45°45′04″N 113°11′34″W, el. 9,088 feet (2,770 m)
- Gallagher Butte, 45°01′20″N 112°42′31″W, el. 8,212 feet (2,503 m)
- Gallagher Mountain, 45°00′59″N 112°43′01″W, el. 8,481 feet (2,585 m)
- Garfield Mountain, 44°31′13″N 112°37′16″W, el. 10,961 feet (3,341 m)
- Garrett Hill, 45°19′11″N 113°03′35″W, el. 7,926 feet (2,416 m)
- Goat Mountain, 45°25′50″N 113°02′12″W, el. 9,035 feet (2,754 m)
- Granite Mountain, 45°34′05″N 112°55′52″W, el. 10,623 feet (3,238 m)
- Graphite Mountain, 44°43′30″N 112°55′41″W, el. 9,406 feet (2,867 m)
- Grassy Top, 44°41′11″N 112°55′59″W, el. 9,570 feet (2,920 m)
- Gray Jockey Peak, 45°43′00″N 112°56′02″W, el. 8,599 feet (2,621 m)
- Greenstone Mountain, 45°25′06″N 112°48′14″W, el. 7,779 feet (2,371 m)
- Grizzly Hill, 44°46′40″N 113°20′26″W, el. 8,986 feet (2,739 m)
- Harrison Peak, 45°15′47″N 113°13′25″W, el. 9,344 feet (2,848 m)
- Highboy Mountain, 45°25′16″N 113°00′42″W, el. 10,413 feet (3,174 m)
- Hirschy Mountain, 45°22′25″N 113°42′24″W, el. 10,282 feet (3,134 m)
- Homer Youngs Peak, 45°18′41″N 113°40′38″W, el. 10,610 feet (3,230 m)
- Humbolt Mountain, 45°22′25″N 112°52′02″W, el. 9,203 feet (2,805 m)
- Inabnit Butte, 45°20′51″N 113°21′29″W, el. 7,047 feet (2,148 m)
- Indian Head, 44°59′05″N 112°56′26″W, el. 6,398 feet (1,950 m)
- Island Butte, 44°36′47″N 112°58′04″W, el. 8,202 feet (2,500 m)
- Italian Peak, 44°21′36″N 112°51′20″W, el. 10,928 feet (3,331 m)
- Jackson Hill, 45°24′47″N 113°21′55″W, el. 8,015 feet (2,443 m)
- Jeff Davis Peak, 44°53′26″N 113°08′20″W, el. 9,564 feet (2,915 m)
- Jim Brown Mountain, 45°03′24″N 112°44′22″W, el. 7,129 feet (2,173 m)
- Jumbo Mountain (Beaverhead County, Montana), 45°27′16″N 113°44′21″W, el. 9,744 feet (2,970 m)
- Keokirk Mountain, 45°35′38″N 112°57′04″W, el. 9,787 feet (2,983 m)
- Knob Mountain, 44°28′55″N 112°35′01″W, el. 9,734 feet (2,967 m)
- Laphan Mountain, 45°16′33″N 113°23′51″W, el. 7,812 feet (2,381 m)
- Lima Peaks, 44°32′14″N 112°35′55″W, el. 10,695 feet (3,260 m)
- Limestone Mountain, 45°23′50″N 112°48′11″W, el. 7,011 feet (2,137 m)
- Lion Mountain, 45°36′24″N 112°56′28″W, el. 9,550 feet (2,910 m)
- Little Table Mountain, 44°31′26″N 112°06′31″W, el. 8,615 feet (2,626 m)
- Lone Butte, 44°44′55″N 112°00′14″W, el. 7,244 feet (2,208 m)
- Lost Horse Mountain, 45°41′47″N 113°09′11″W, el. 8,527 feet (2,599 m)
- Maiden Peak, 44°49′48″N 113°07′24″W, el. 10,220 feet (3,120 m)
- Maurice Mountain, 45°36′22″N 113°02′06″W, el. 9,767 feet (2,977 m)
- Maverick Mountain, 45°26′55″N 113°09′47″W, el. 8,720 feet (2,660 m)
- Medicine Lodge Peak, 44°47′19″N 113°02′59″W, el. 9,058 feet (2,761 m)
- Merden Peak, 44°42′07″N 112°08′26″W, el. 7,106 feet (2,166 m)
- Middle Mountain, 45°25′32″N 112°52′25″W, el. 7,736 feet (2,358 m)
- Monument Hill, 44°52′57″N 112°40′00″W, el. 8,176 feet (2,492 m)
- Monument Peak, 45°15′51″N 113°41′33″W, el. 10,282 feet (3,134 m)
- Mooney Mountain, 45°05′28″N 112°45′25″W, el. 6,594 feet (2,010 m)
- Morgan Mountain, 45°31′14″N 113°50′04″W, el. 8,300 feet (2,500 m)
- Morrison Hill, 45°36′48″N 112°51′39″W, el. 9,052 feet (2,759 m)
- Mount Alverson, 45°31′50″N 112°58′36″W, el. 10,420 feet (3,180 m)
- Mount Jefferson, 44°33′45″N 111°30′17″W, el. 10,085 feet (3,074 m)
- Mount Tahepia, 45°32′38″N 112°58′20″W, el. 10,351 feet (3,155 m)
- Needle Rock, 45°40′36″N 113°03′27″W, el. 6,627 feet (2,020 m)
- Nemesis Mountain, 44°34′49″N 111°32′35″W, el. 9,337 feet (2,846 m)
- Odell Mountain, 45°34′39″N 113°15′24″W, el. 9,409 feet (2,868 m)
- Ore Camp Hill, 45°39′30″N 112°52′20″W, el. 7,815 feet (2,382 m)
- Painter Peak, 45°09′21″N 113°18′13″W, el. 9,593 feet (2,924 m)
- Patchtop Mountain, 44°44′35″N 111°52′09″W, el. 8,195 feet (2,498 m)
- Pinetop Hill, 44°33′45″N 112°21′39″W, el. 7,365 feet (2,245 m)
- Ponsonby Peak, 45°43′43″N 112°54′48″W, el. 8,172 feet (2,491 m)
- Pyramid Hill, 45°00′53″N 113°24′24″W, el. 7,628 feet (2,325 m)
- Pyramid Peak, 45°27′18″N 113°47′02″W, el. 9,577 feet (2,919 m)
- Quartz Hill, 45°17′48″N 112°51′23″W, el. 6,690 feet (2,040 m)
- Quartz Hill, 45°42′33″N 112°54′19″W, el. 8,084 feet (2,464 m)
- Reas Peak, 44°32′09″N 111°30′47″W, el. 9,350 feet (2,850 m)
- Red Butte, 45°19′15″N 112°56′41″W, el. 7,444 feet (2,269 m)
- Red Butte, 44°43′32″N 112°40′33″W, el. 6,470 feet (1,970 m)
- Red Butte, 45°00′59″N 113°13′36″W, el. 6,542 feet (1,994 m)
- Red Butte, 45°15′51″N 113°03′45″W, el. 6,637 feet (2,023 m)
- Red Conglomerate Peaks, 44°29′06″N 112°36′00″W, el. 10,197 feet (3,108 m)
- Red Rock Mountain, 44°34′36″N 111°30′26″W, el. 9,501 feet (2,896 m)
- Retort Mountain, 45°02′00″N 112°40′46″W, el. 7,116 feet (2,169 m)
- Round Top Mountain, 45°45′05″N 113°05′44″W, el. 9,337 feet (2,846 m)
- Saddle Mountain, 44°39′34″N 111°30′34″W, el. 8,294 feet (2,528 m)
- Saddleback Mountain, 45°27′40″N 113°01′51″W, el. 10,046 feet (3,062 m)
- Sawtooth Mountain, 44°48′12″N 112°13′01″W, el. 10,036 feet (3,059 m)
- Sawtooth Mountain, 45°25′49″N 113°00′43″W, el. 10,020 feet (3,050 m)
- Selway Mountain, 45°08′45″N 113°27′22″W, el. 8,898 feet (2,712 m)
- Seymore Mountain, 45°31′17″N 113°08′52″W, el. 8,894 feet (2,711 m)
- Sharp Mountain, 45°34′02″N 112°58′43″W, el. 10,092 feet (3,076 m)
- Shaw Mountain, 45°43′05″N 113°13′52″W, el. 8,937 feet (2,724 m)
- Sheep Mountain, 44°34′35″N 111°44′03″W, el. 9,600 feet (2,900 m)
- Sheep Mountain, 45°28′49″N 113°45′35″W, el. 9,875 feet (3,010 m)
- Sheep Mountain, 45°40′50″N 112°58′30″W, el. 9,570 feet (2,920 m)
- Shepherd Mountain, 45°40′01″N 112°44′02″W, el. 7,005 feet (2,135 m)
- Sheriff Mountain, 45°36′39″N 112°56′01″W, el. 9,787 feet (2,983 m)
- Ski Hill, 45°17′39″N 113°24′39″W, el. 7,746 feet (2,361 m)
- Slide Mountain, 44°32′57″N 111°51′26″W, el. 9,806 feet (2,989 m)
- Sourdough Peak, 44°41′11″N 112°55′59″W, el. 9,570 feet (2,920 m)
- Stewart Mountain, 45°30′32″N 113°16′41″W, el. 8,100 feet (2,500 m)
- Stine Mountain, 45°43′24″N 113°06′54″W, el. 9,501 feet (2,896 m)
- Storm Peak, 45°33′49″N 112°51′00″W, el. 9,462 feet (2,884 m)
- Sugarloaf Hill, 45°41′25″N 113°02′34″W, el. 6,578 feet (2,005 m)
- Sugarloaf Mountain, 45°30′32″N 112°49′03″W, el. 8,835 feet (2,693 m)
- Table Mountain, 45°34′51″N 113°10′16″W, el. 8,419 feet (2,566 m)
- Tash Peak, 45°15′15″N 113°13′34″W, el. 9,242 feet (2,817 m)
- Taylor Mountain, 44°33′45″N 111°40′59″W, el. 9,547 feet (2,910 m)
- Tent Mountain, 45°24′47″N 112°59′12″W, el. 10,184 feet (3,104 m)
- Tepee Mountain, 44°44′36″N 113°06′28″W, el. 9,101 feet (2,774 m)
- The Iron Mine, 45°09′07″N 112°28′10″W, el. 6,594 feet (2,010 m)
- Thunderhead Mountain, 45°25′51″N 112°50′05″W, el. 8,215 feet (2,504 m)
- Timber Butte, 45°10′41″N 112°51′11″W, el. 6,726 feet (2,050 m)
- Timber Butte, 44°44′32″N 112°48′59″W, el. 9,304 feet (2,836 m)
- Timber Hill, 45°02′31″N 112°17′16″W, el. 7,175 feet (2,187 m)
- Torrey Mountain, 45°27′21″N 112°58′22″W, el. 11,128 feet (3,392 m)
- Tower Mountain, 45°24′07″N 112°53′28″W, el. 9,272 feet (2,826 m)
- Trident Peak, 45°47′54″N 113°11′12″W, el. 7,969 feet (2,429 m)
- Tweedy Mountain, 45°28′50″N 112°57′55″W, el. 11,135 feet (3,394 m)
- Twin Adams Mountain, 45°28′29″N 112°48′15″W, el. 8,169 feet (2,490 m)
- Vinegar Hill, 44°46′58″N 112°26′21″W, el. 8,153 feet (2,485 m)
- West Pintler Peak, 45°56′18″N 113°30′58″W, el. 9,478 feet (2,889 m)
- White Hills, 44°52′12″N 112°31′27″W, el. 6,883 feet (2,098 m)
- Woody Mountain, 45°25′00″N 113°19′50″W, el. 8,136 feet (2,480 m)
- Wooster Mountain, 45°43′57″N 113°41′44″W, el. 7,680 feet (2,340 m)

== See also ==
- List of mountains in Montana
- List of mountain ranges in Montana
