= Bloody Dick =

Bloody Dick may refer to:

- Bloody Dick Creek, a stream in Montana, United States
- Bloody Dick Peak, a summit in Montana, United States
