= Taylor Peak =

Taylor Peak may refer to

- Taylor Peak (Antarctica)
- Mountains in the USA:
  - Taylor Peak (Alaska)
  - Taylor Peak (California)
  - Taylor Peak (Grand County, Colorado)
  - Taylor Peak (Gunnison County, Colorado)
  - Taylor Peak (Idaho)
  - Taylor Peaks (Madison County, Montana)
  - Taylor Peak (Judith Basin County, Montana)
  - Taylor Peak (Lincoln County, Montana)
  - Taylor Peak (White Pine County, Nevada)
  - Taylor Peak (Lea County, New Mexico)
  - Taylor Peak (Sierra County, New Mexico)

== See also ==
- Taylor Mountain (disambiguation)
