= Taylor Mountain =

Taylor Mountain may refer to

- Mountains in the USA:
  - Taylor Mountain (Alabama)
  - Taylor Mountain (Alaska)
  - Taylor Mountain (Arkansas)
  - Taylor Mountain (Madera County, California)
  - Taylor Mountain (Modoc County, California)
  - Taylor Mountain (Sonoma County, California)
  - Taylor Mountain (Boulder County, Colorado)
  - Taylor Mountain (Chaffee County, Colorado)
  - Taylor Mountain (Idaho/Montana)
  - Taylor Mountain (Bingham County, Idaho)
  - Taylor Mountain (Lemhi County, Idaho) (two in this county)
  - Taylor Mountain (Wayne County, Kentucky)
  - Taylor Mountain (Whitley County, Kentucky)
  - Taylor Mountain (Massachusetts)
  - Taylor Mountain (Judith Basin County, Montana)
  - Taylor Mountain (Lake County, Montana)
  - Taylor Mountain (New Mexico)
  - Taylor Mountain (Orange County, New York)
  - Taylor Mountain (Warren County, New York)
  - Taylor Mountain (Essex County, New York)
  - Taylor Mountain (Oklahoma)
  - Taylor Mountain (Oregon)
  - Taylor Mountain (Tennessee)
  - Taylor Mountain (Bandera County, Texas)
  - Taylor Mountain (Lampasas County, Texas)
  - Taylor Mountain (Milam County, Texas)
  - Taylor Mountain (Utah)
  - Taylors Mountain (Bedford County, Virginia)
  - Taylor Mountain (Washington)
  - Taylor Mountain (Wyoming) (two in Teton county)

== See also ==
- Taylor Peak (disambiguation)
