= Bloody Dick Creek =

Stream in Beaverhead County, Montana, United States

Coordinates: 45°5′52″N 113°25′36″W

Bloody Dick Creek is a stream in Beaverhead County, Montana, in the United States.

It was apparently named in honor of a man who settled nearby in the 1860s.

Bloody Dick Creek is noted for trout fishing. A single cabin is available at Bloody Dick Creek for rental year-round from the United States Forest Service.

== See also ==
- List of rivers of Montana
