= Morgan Mountain =

Topographical feature in California

Coordinates: 40.3710°N 121.5249°W

Morgan Mountain is a summit in the U.S. state of California. The elevation is 6,814 feet (2,077 m).

The mountain has the name of the local Morgan family, the first member of which arrived into area in the 1850s.
