= Sheep Mountain (Beaverhead County, Montana) =

Mountain in Montana, United States

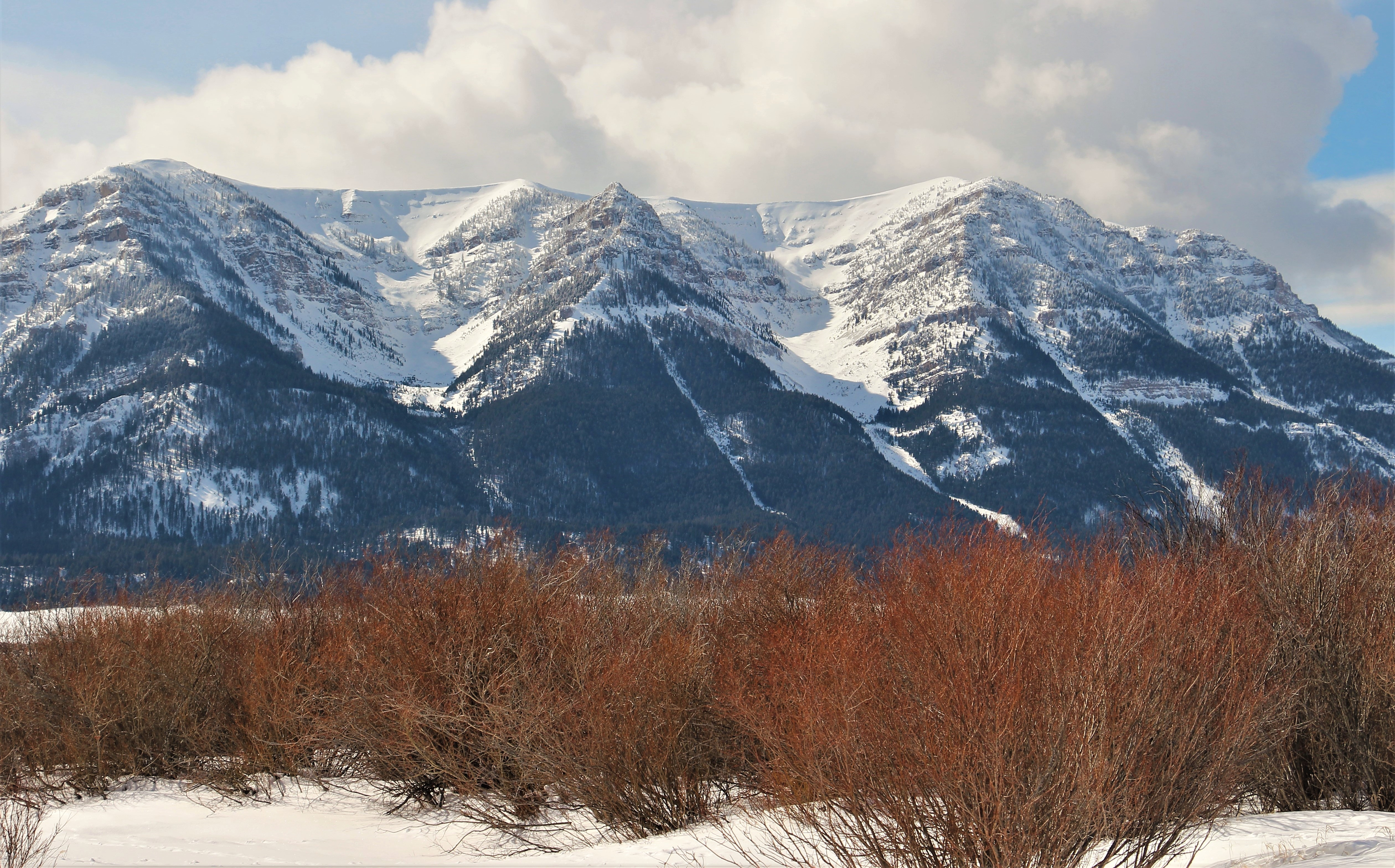
- North aspect in winter

Highest point
- Elevation: 9,688 ft (2,953 m)
- Prominence: 548 ft (167 m)
- Parent peak: Taylor Mountain (9,863 ft)
- Isolation: 2.69 mi (4.33 km)
- Coordinates: 44°34′32″N 111°44′01″W

Geography
- Location within Montana Location within the United States
- Country: United States
- State: Montana
- County: Beaverhead
- Parent range: Rocky Mountains; Bitterroot Range; Centennial Mountains
- Topo map: USGS Upper Red Rock Lake

Sheep Mountain is a 9,688-foot elevation (2,953 m) mountain summit in Beaverhead County, Montana, United States.

== Description ==
Sheep Mountain is the seventh-highest peak in the Centennial Mountains which are a subrange of the Bitterroot Range. It is located immediately south of Red Rock Lakes National Wildlife Refuge and 2.69 miles (4.33 km) west-northwest of line parent Taylor Mountain. The summit is less than two miles from the Continental Divide and the Idaho–Montana border. Precipitation runoff from the mountain's slopes drains to the Red Rock Lakes and topographic relief is significant as the summit rises 3,050 feet (930 meters) above Upper Red Rock Lake in 1.2 mile (1.9 km). This landform's toponym has been officially adopted by the United States Board on Geographic Names.

== Climate ==
Based on the Köppen climate classification, Sheep Mountain is located in a subarctic climate zone characterized by long, usually very cold winters, and mild summers. Winter temperatures can drop below −10 °F with wind chill factors below −30 °F.

== See also ==
- Geology of the Rocky Mountains

== Gallery ==
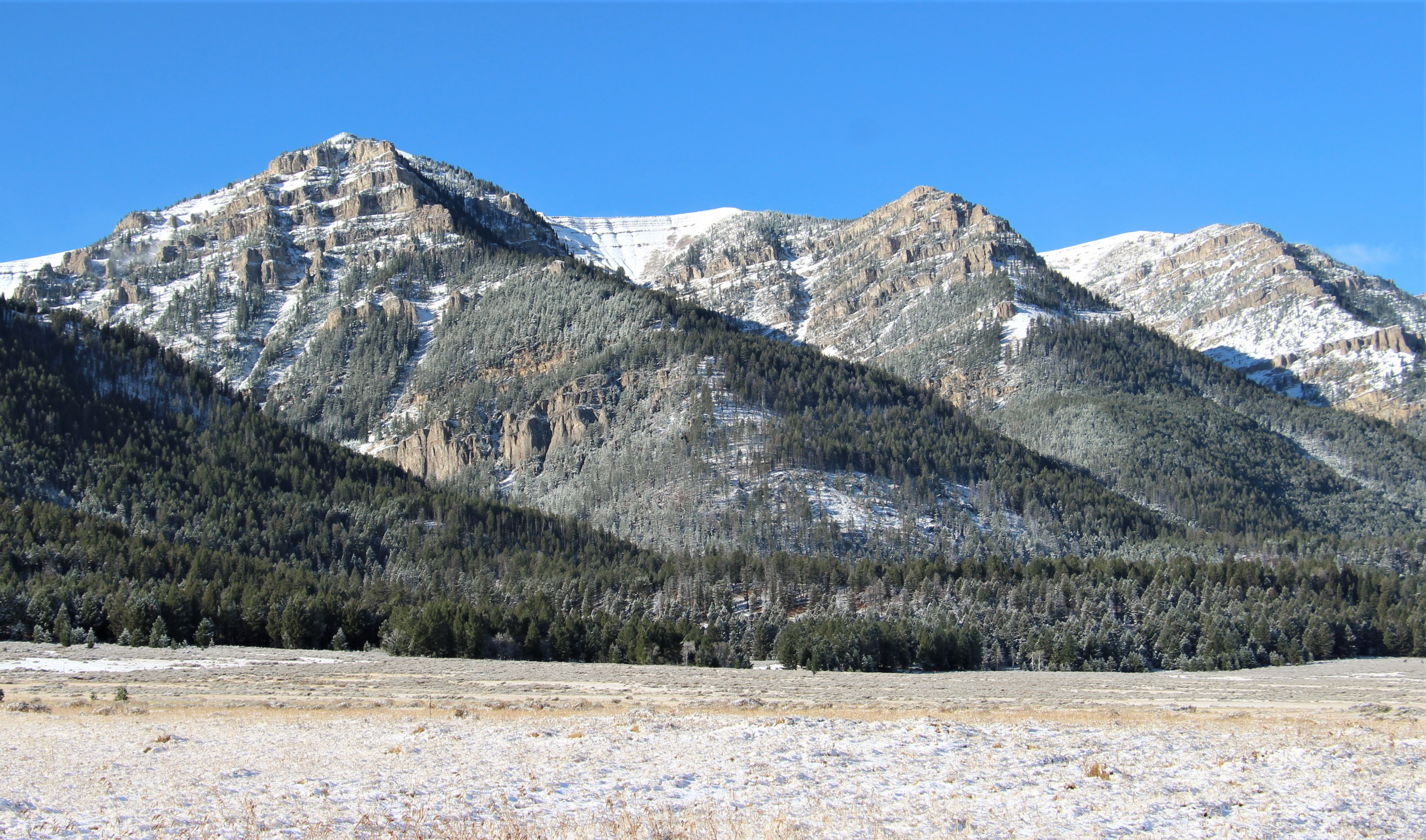
Sheep Mountain from the northeast. 9593' (left), 9688' (far right)

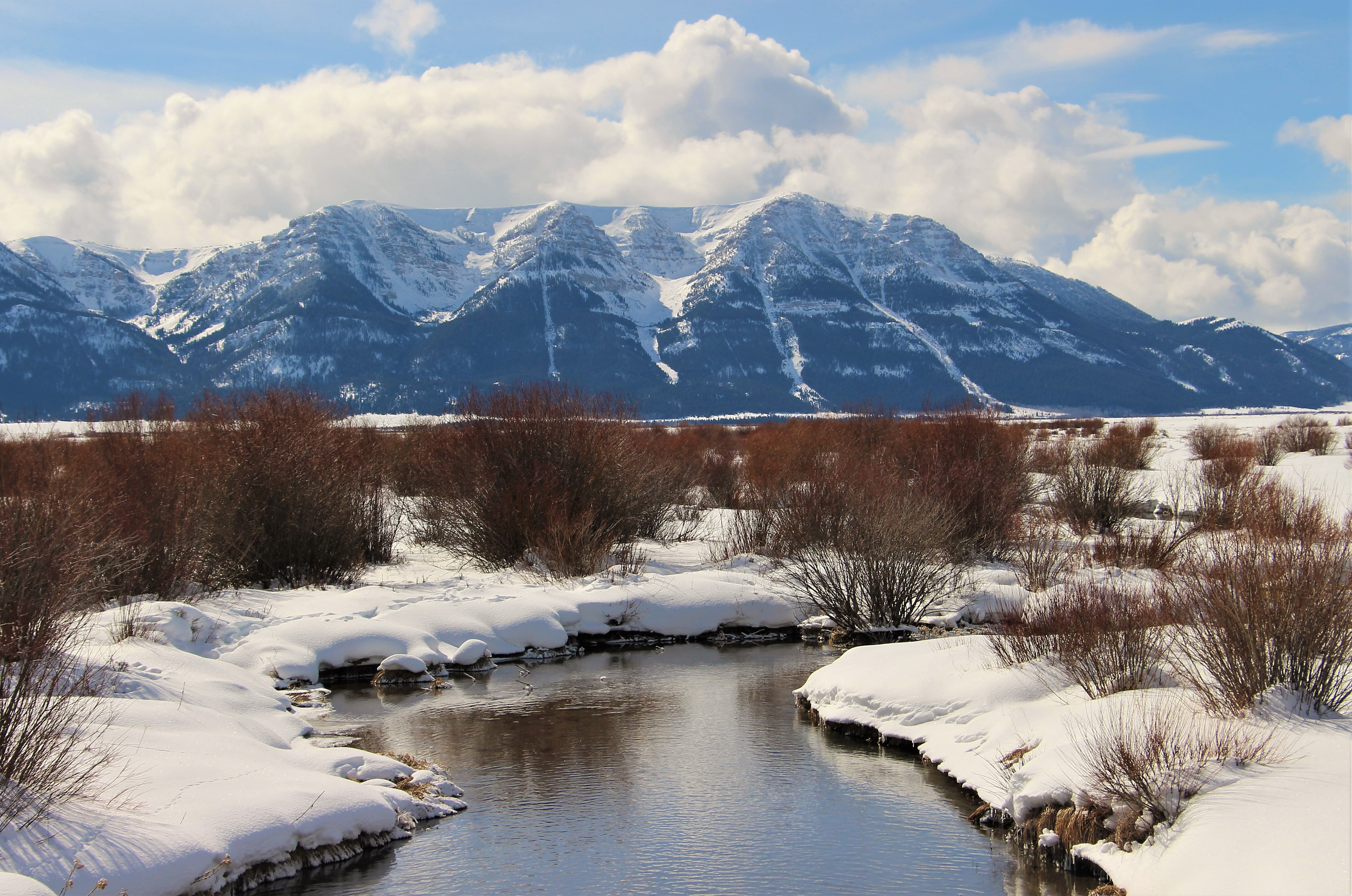
Elk Springs Creek trickles along through the willows in winter at Red Rock Lakes National Wildlife Refuge with Sheep Mountain in the background.

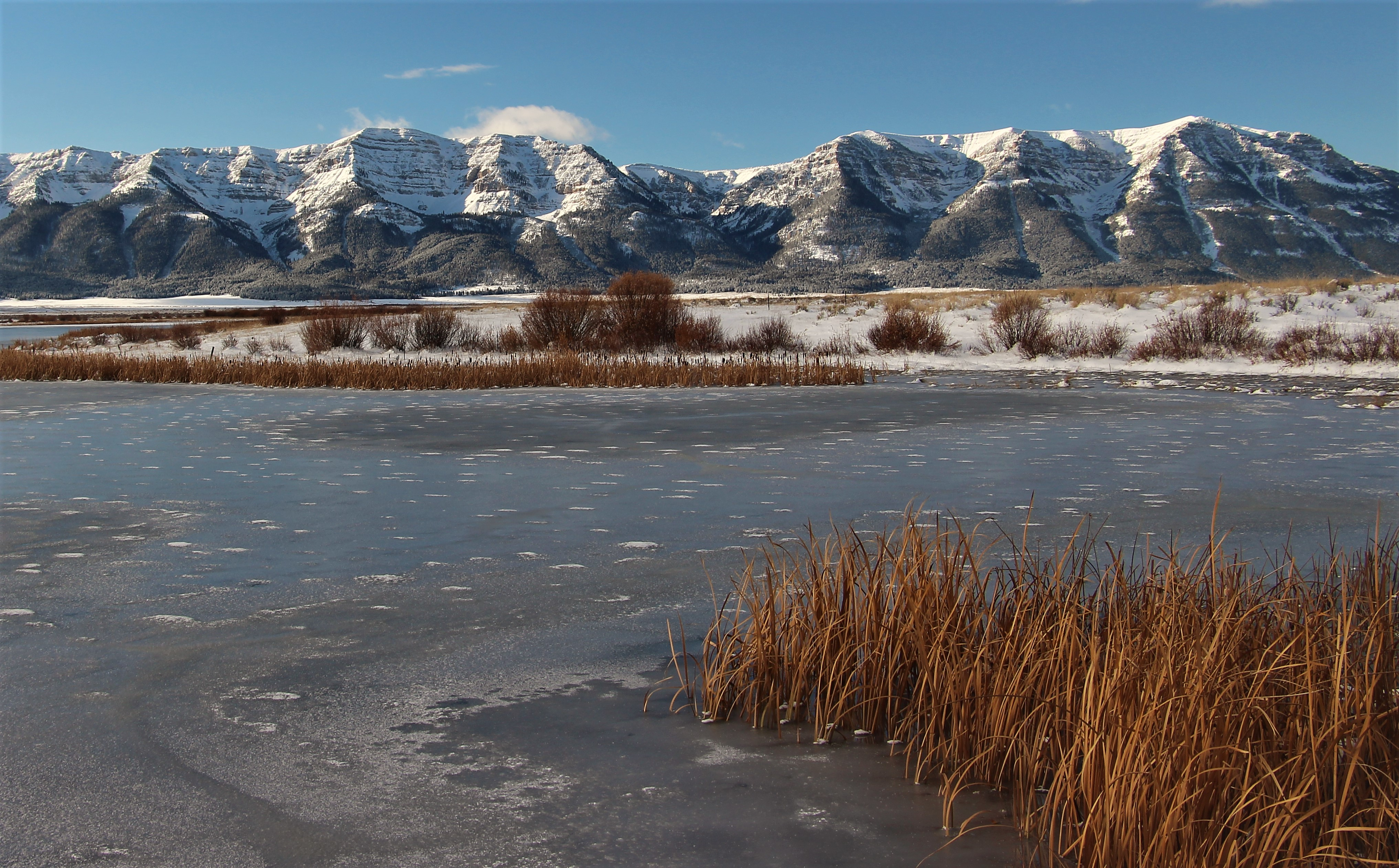
Taylor Mountain (left) and Sheep Mountain (right) from frozen Widgeon Pond at Red Rock Lakes National Wildlife Refuge

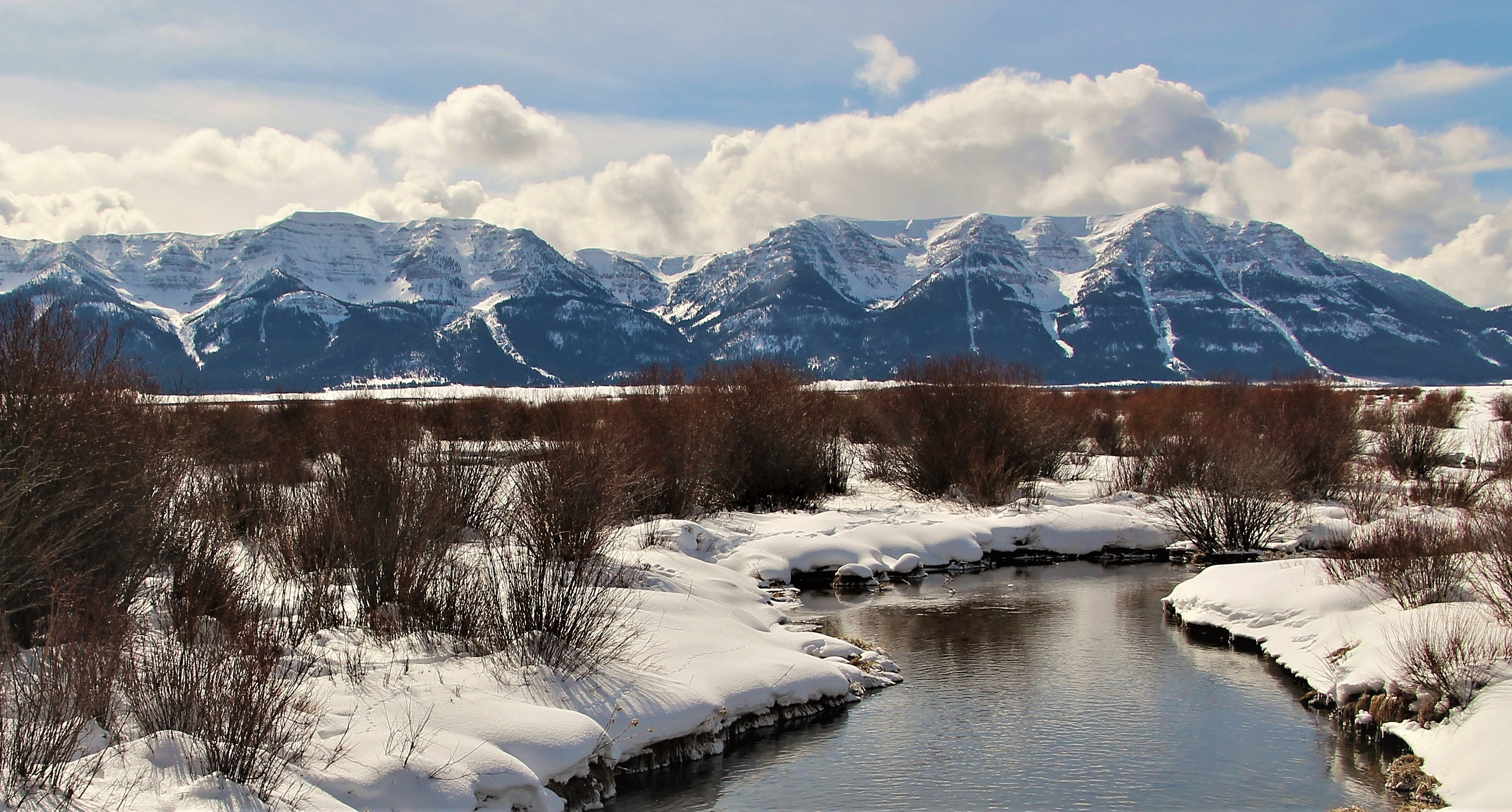
Taylor Mountain (left) and Sheep Mountain (right)
