= Taylor Mountain (Idaho/Montana) =

Mountain in Idaho and Montana, United States

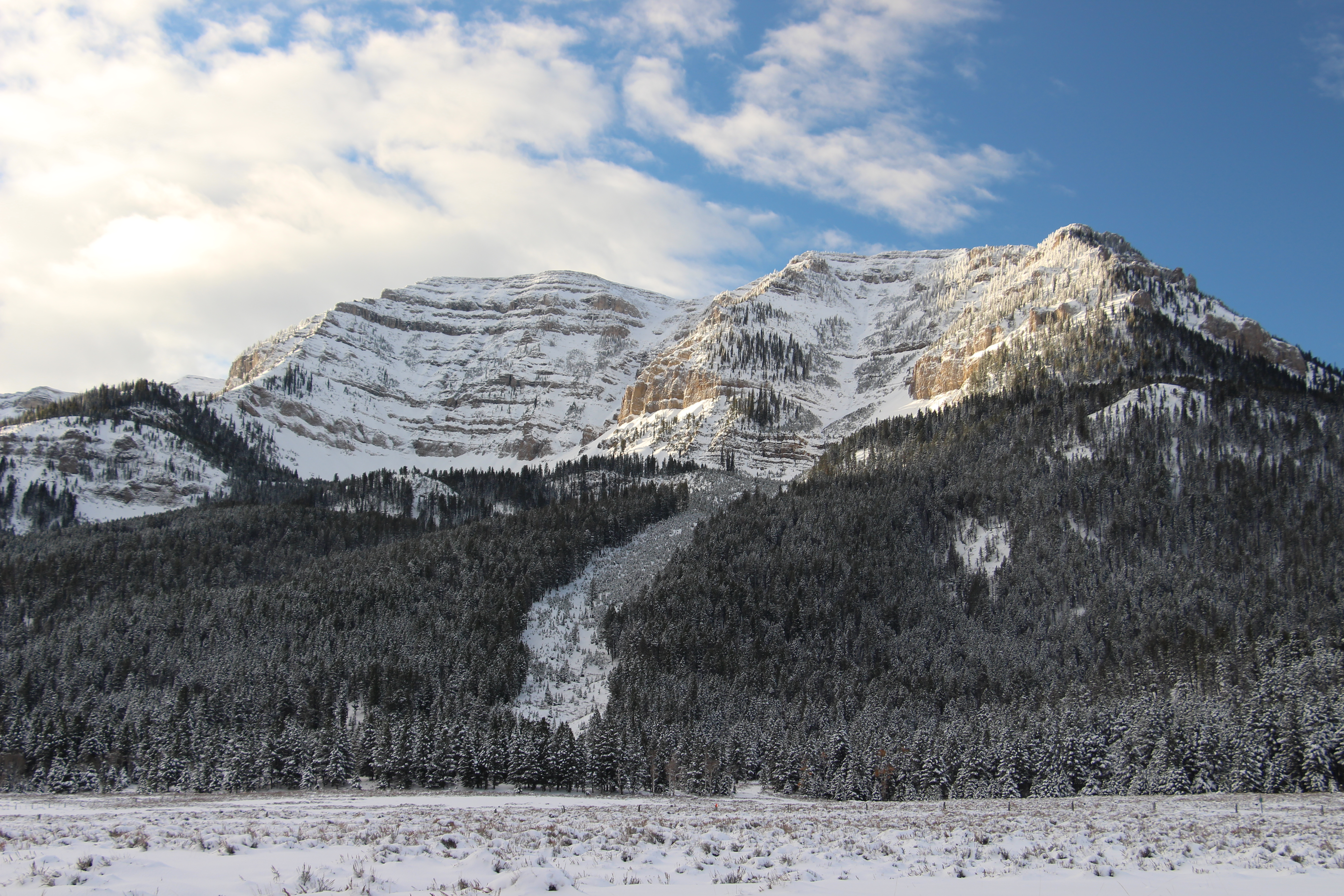
- North aspect

Highest point
- Elevation: 9,863 ft (3,006 m)
- Prominence: 1,880 ft (570 m)
- Parent peak: Mount Jefferson (10,216 ft)
- Isolation: 8.77 mi (14.11 km)
- Coordinates: 44°33′41″N 111°40′59″W

Geography
- Location within Montana Location within the United States
- Country: United States
- State: Idaho / Montana
- County: Clark / Beaverhead
- Protected area: Caribou–Targhee National Forest
- Parent range: Rocky Mountains; Bitterroot Range; Centennial Mountains
- Topo map: USGS Upper Red Rock Lake

Climbing
- Easiest route: class 2

Taylor Mountain is a 9,863-foot elevation (3,006 m) mountain summit on the common border shared by Beaverhead County, Montana, and Clark County, Idaho. Named after James Madison Taylor.

== Description ==
Taylor Mountain is the fifth-highest peak in the Centennial Mountains which are a subrange of the Bitterroot Range. The summit lies on the Continental Divide and the Idaho–Montana border. It is located immediately south of Red Rock Lakes National Wildlife Refuge on land managed by Caribou–Targhee National Forest. Precipitation runoff from the mountain's north slope drains to Upper Red Rock Lake and the south slope drains to Taylor Creek. Topographic relief is significant as the mountain's north aspect rises 3,060 feet (930 meters) in 1.5 mile. This landform's toponym has been officially adopted by the United States Board on Geographic Names.

== Climate ==
Based on the Köppen climate classification, Taylor Mountain is located in a subarctic climate zone characterized by long, usually very cold winters, and mild summers. Winter temperatures can drop below −10 °F with wind chill factors below −30 °F.

== See also ==
- Geology of the Rocky Mountains

== Gallery ==
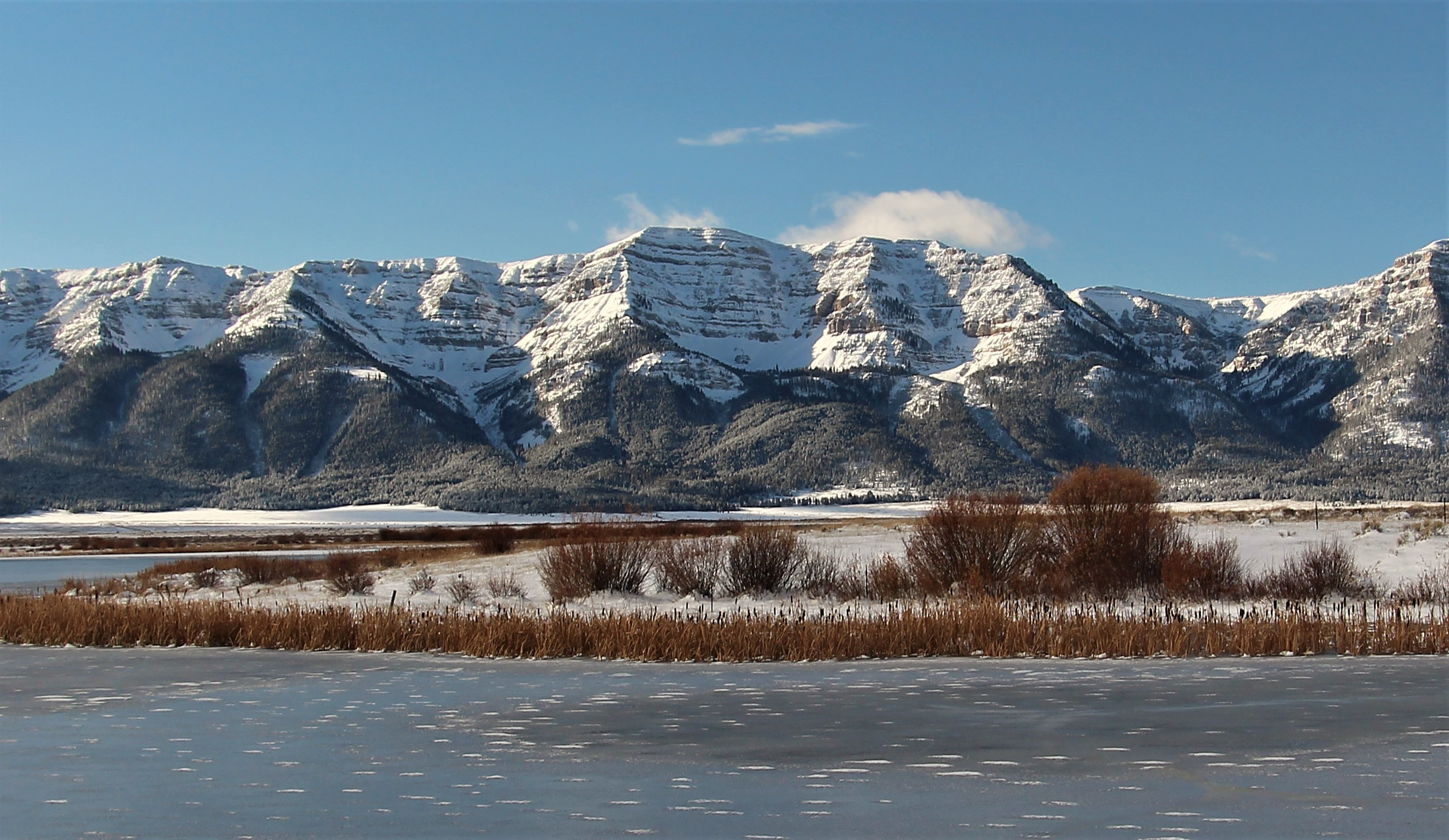
Taylor Mountain

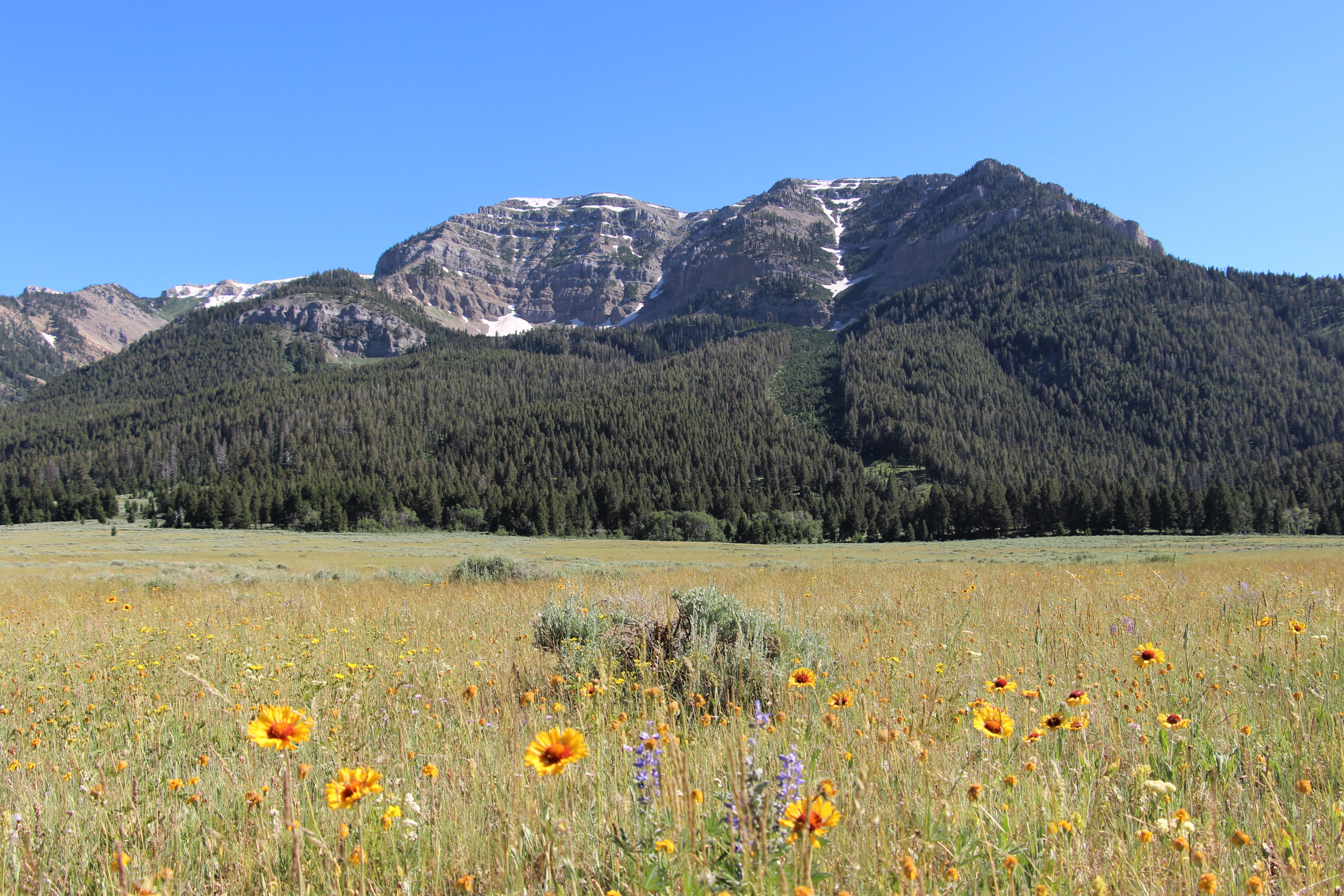
Taylor Mountain

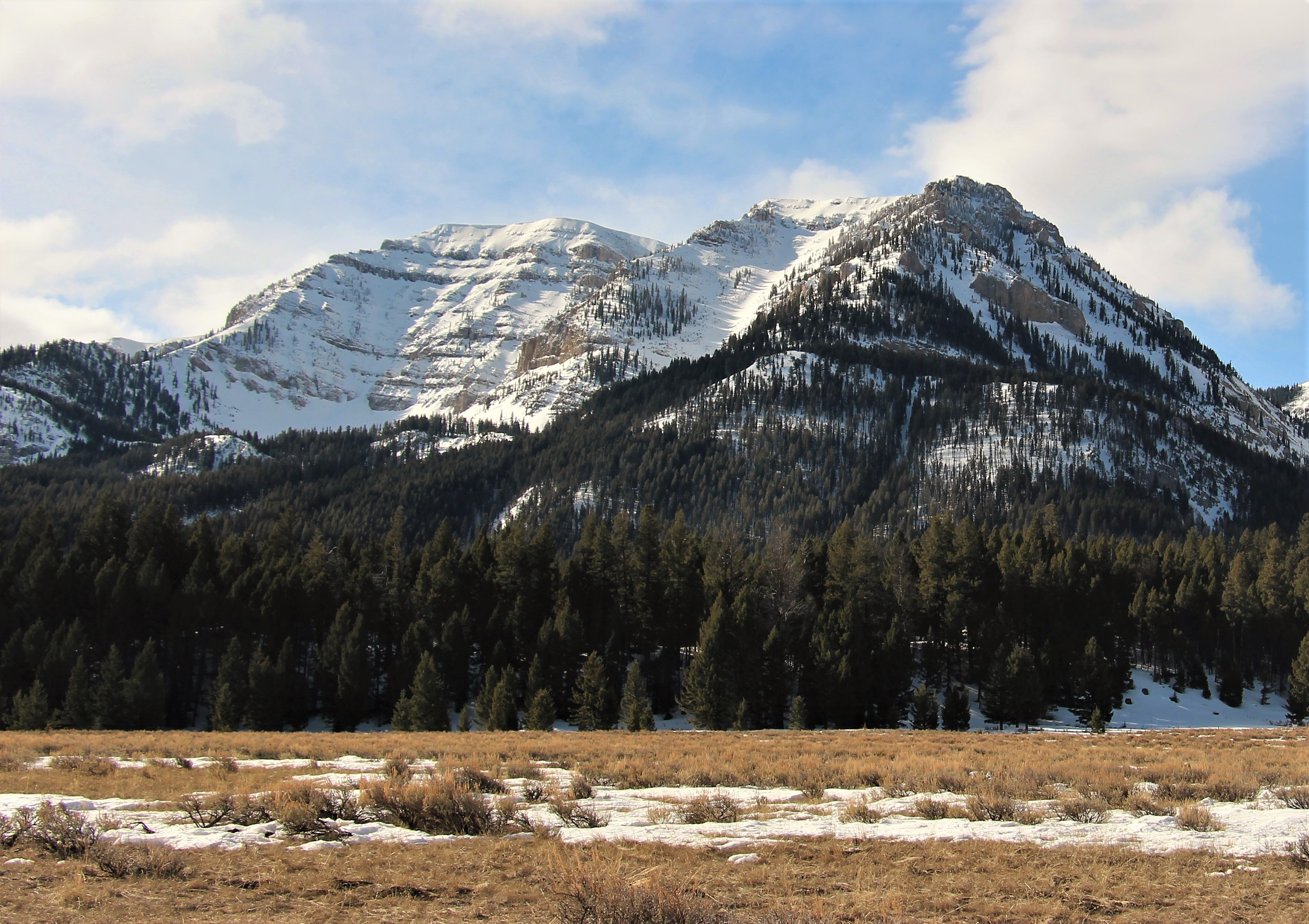
Taylor Mountain

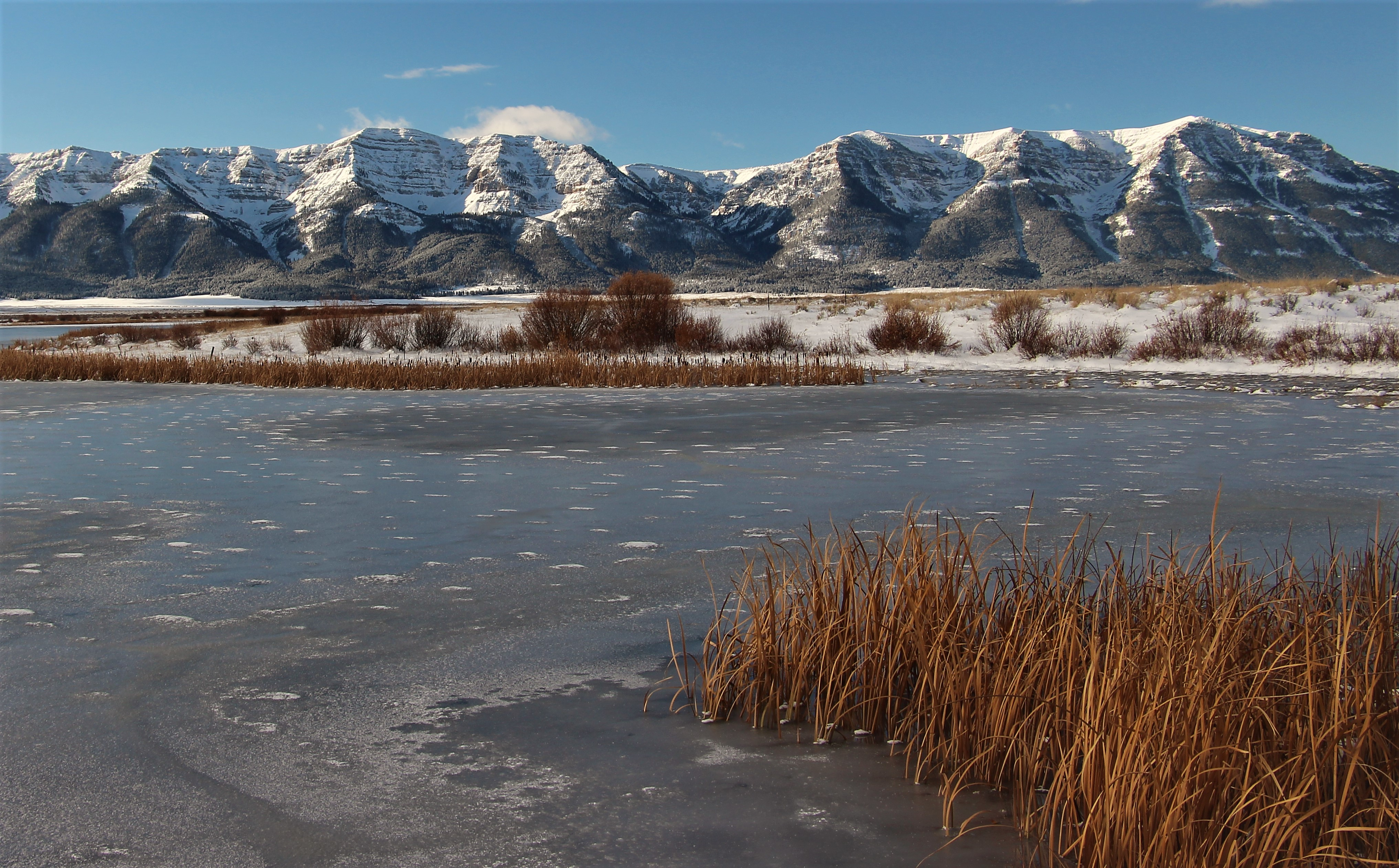
Taylor Mountain (left) and Sheep Mountain (right) from frozen Widgeon Pond at Red Rock Lakes National Wildlife Refuge

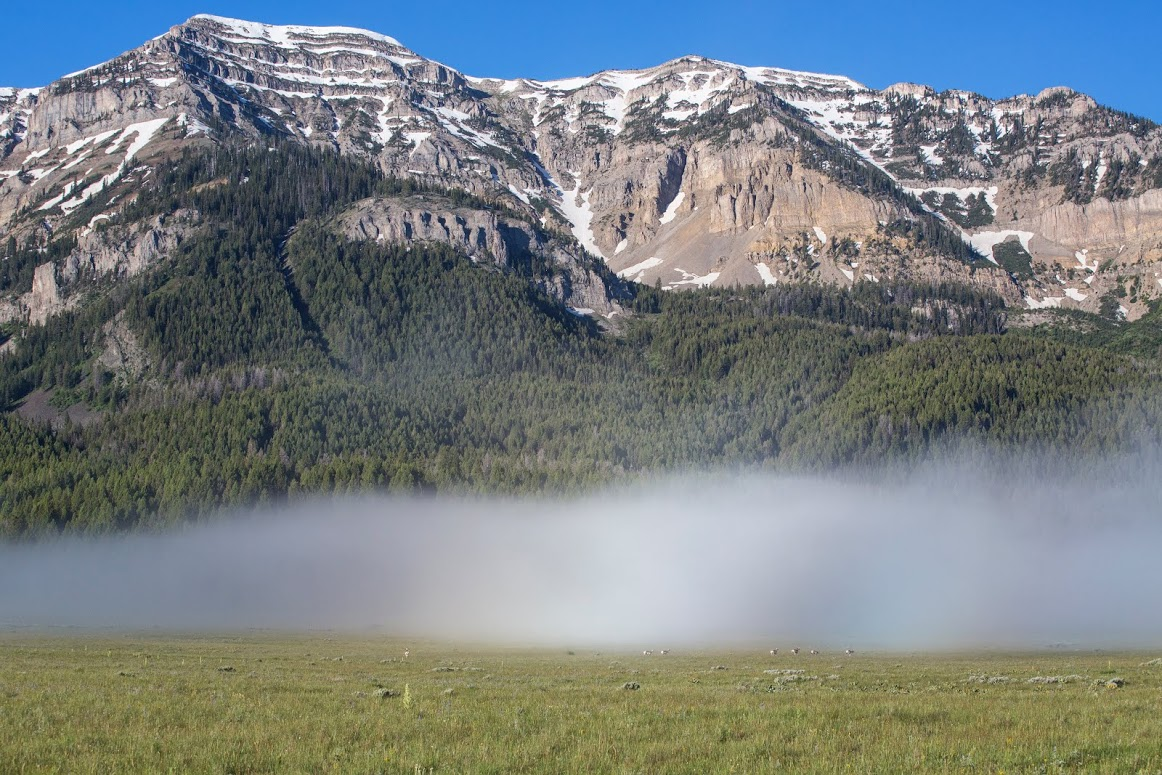
Taylor Mountain (summit to left)

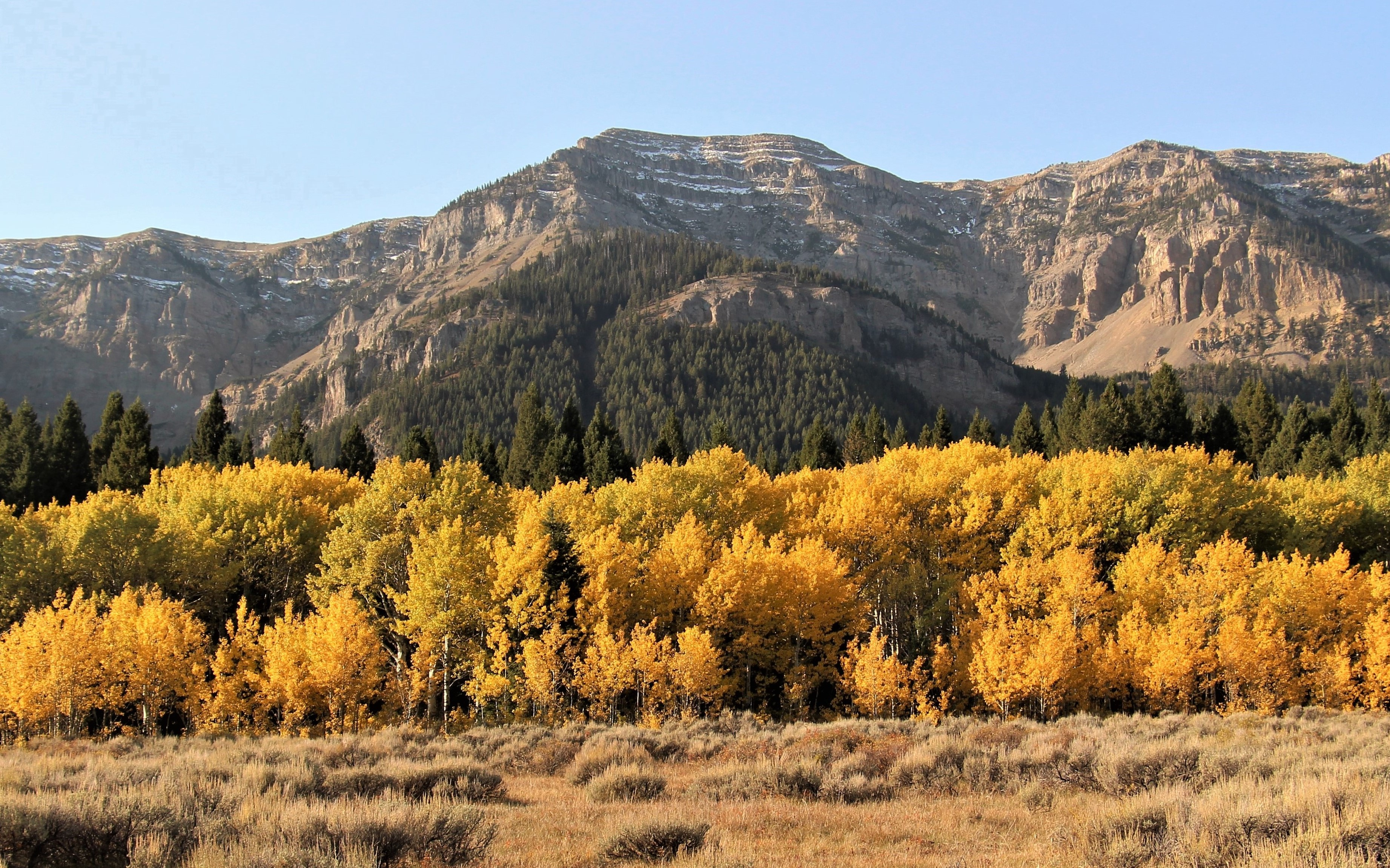
Taylor Mountain in autumn

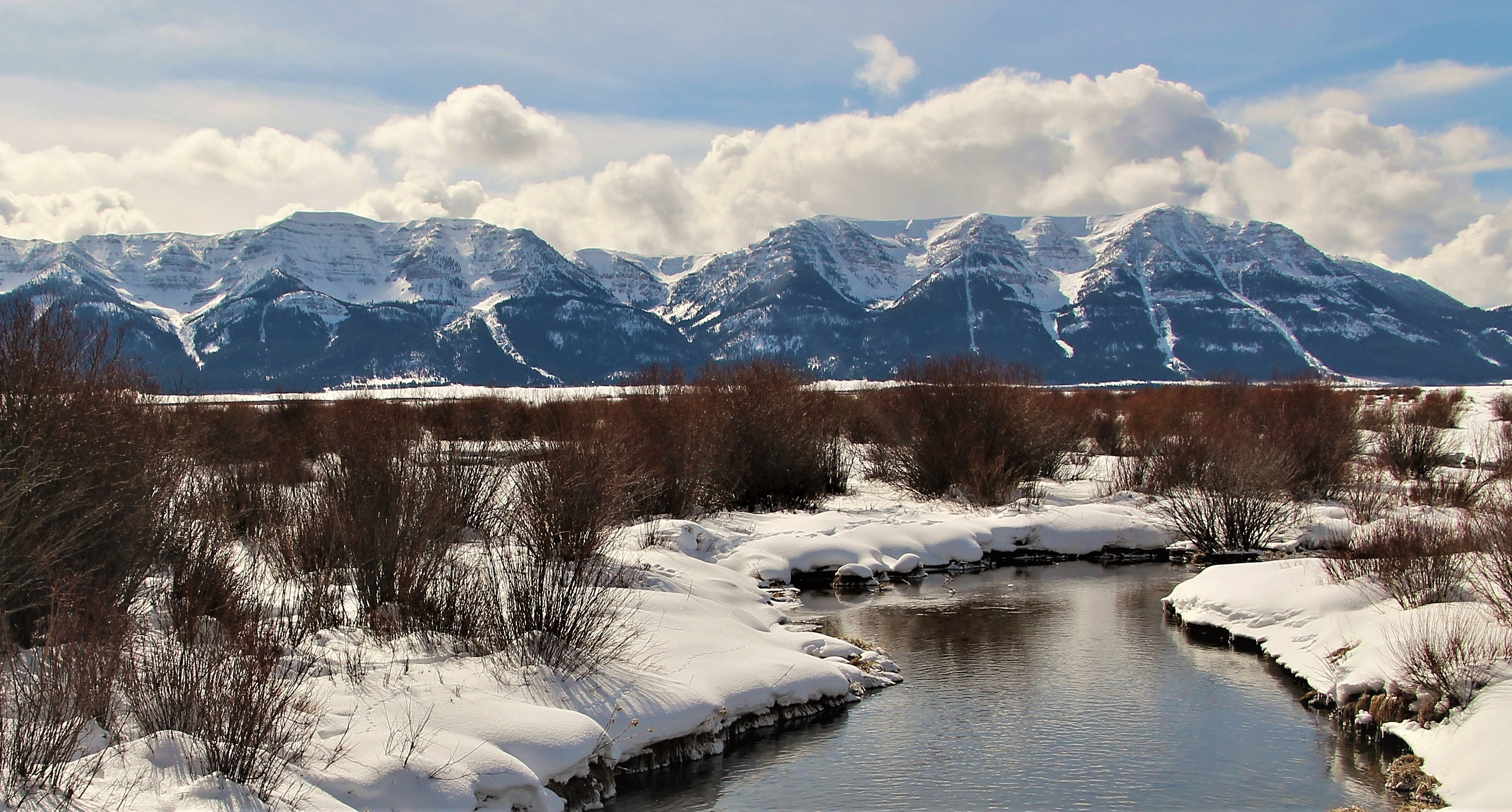
Taylor Mountain (left) and Sheep Mountain (right)
