= Taylor Peak (Gunnison County, Colorado) =

Mountain in the state of Colorado

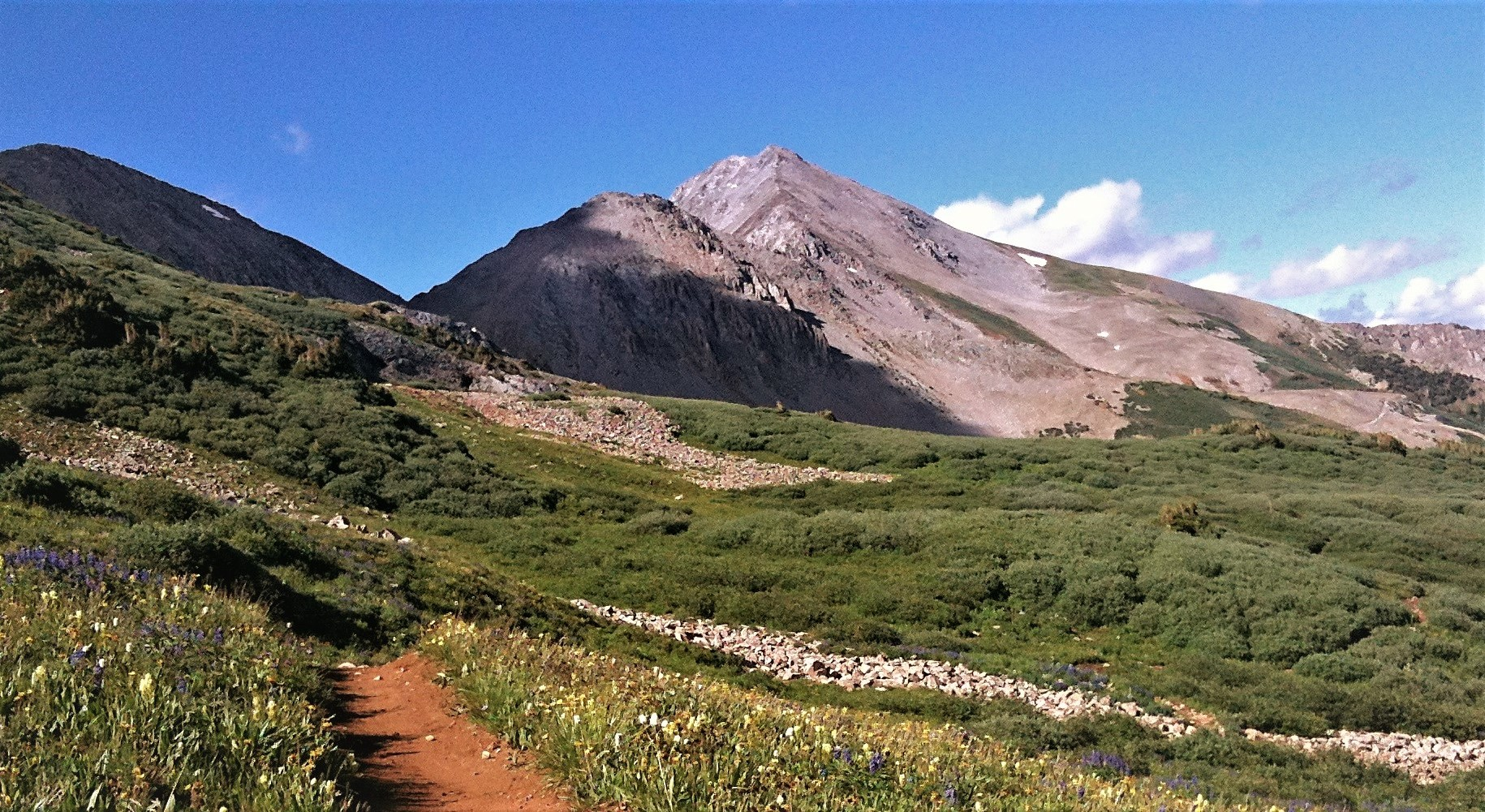
- Northwest aspect

Highest point
- Elevation: 13,435 ft (4,095 m)
- Prominence: 817 ft (249 m)
- Parent peak: Star Peak (13,527 ft)
- Isolation: 1.26 mi (2.03 km)
- Coordinates: 38°59′32″N 106°46′57″W

Geography
- Location within Colorado Location within the United States
- Country: United States
- State: Colorado
- County: Gunnison / Pitkin
- Parent range: Rocky Mountains; Elk Mountains
- Topo map: USGS Pearl Pass

Climbing
- Easiest route: class 2 hiking

Taylor Peak is a 13,435-foot (4,095 m) summit on the boundary shared by Gunnison County and Pitkin County in Colorado, United States.

== Description ==
Taylor Peak is situated 10 miles (16 km) west of the Continental Divide in the Elk Mountains which are a subrange of the Rocky Mountains. The mountain is located 14 miles (23 km) south of the community of Aspen and set on the boundary shared by White River National Forest and Gunnison National Forest. It ranks as the fifth-highest peak within the Gunnison National Forest. Precipitation runoff from the mountain's west slope drains to the Roaring Fork River via Cooper Creek and Castle Creek, whereas the east slope drains into the headwaters of the Taylor River. Topographic relief is modest as the summit rises over 2,430 feet (741 m) above Taylor River in one mile (1.6 km). The mountain's toponym has been officially adopted by the United States Board on Geographic Names, and has been recorded in publications since at least 1891.

== Climate ==
According to the Köppen climate classification system, Taylor Peak is located in an alpine subarctic climate zone with cold, snowy winters, and cool to warm summers. Due to its altitude, it receives precipitation all year, as snow in winter and as thunderstorms in summer, with a dry period in late spring.

== Gallery ==
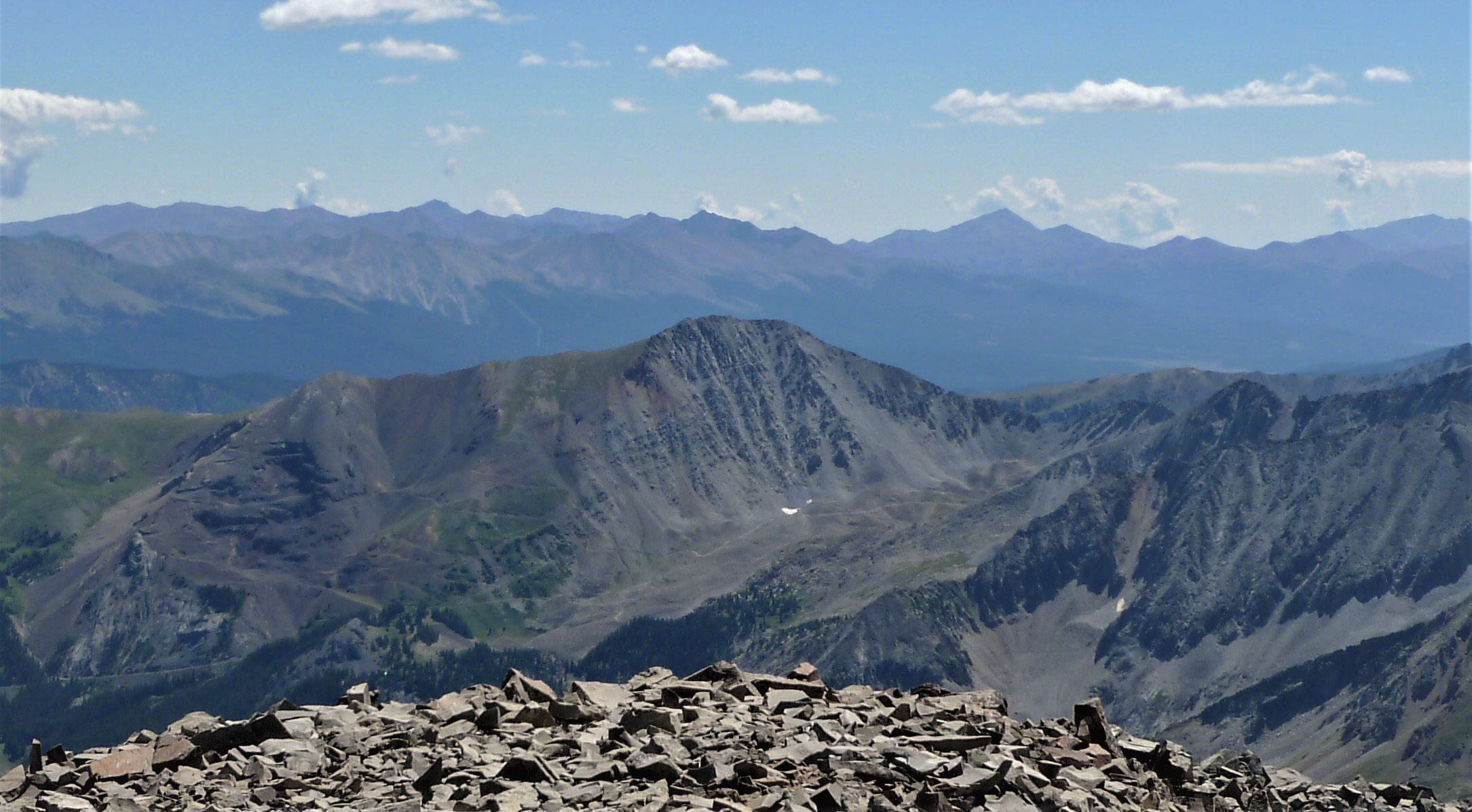
Taylor Peak from Castle Peak

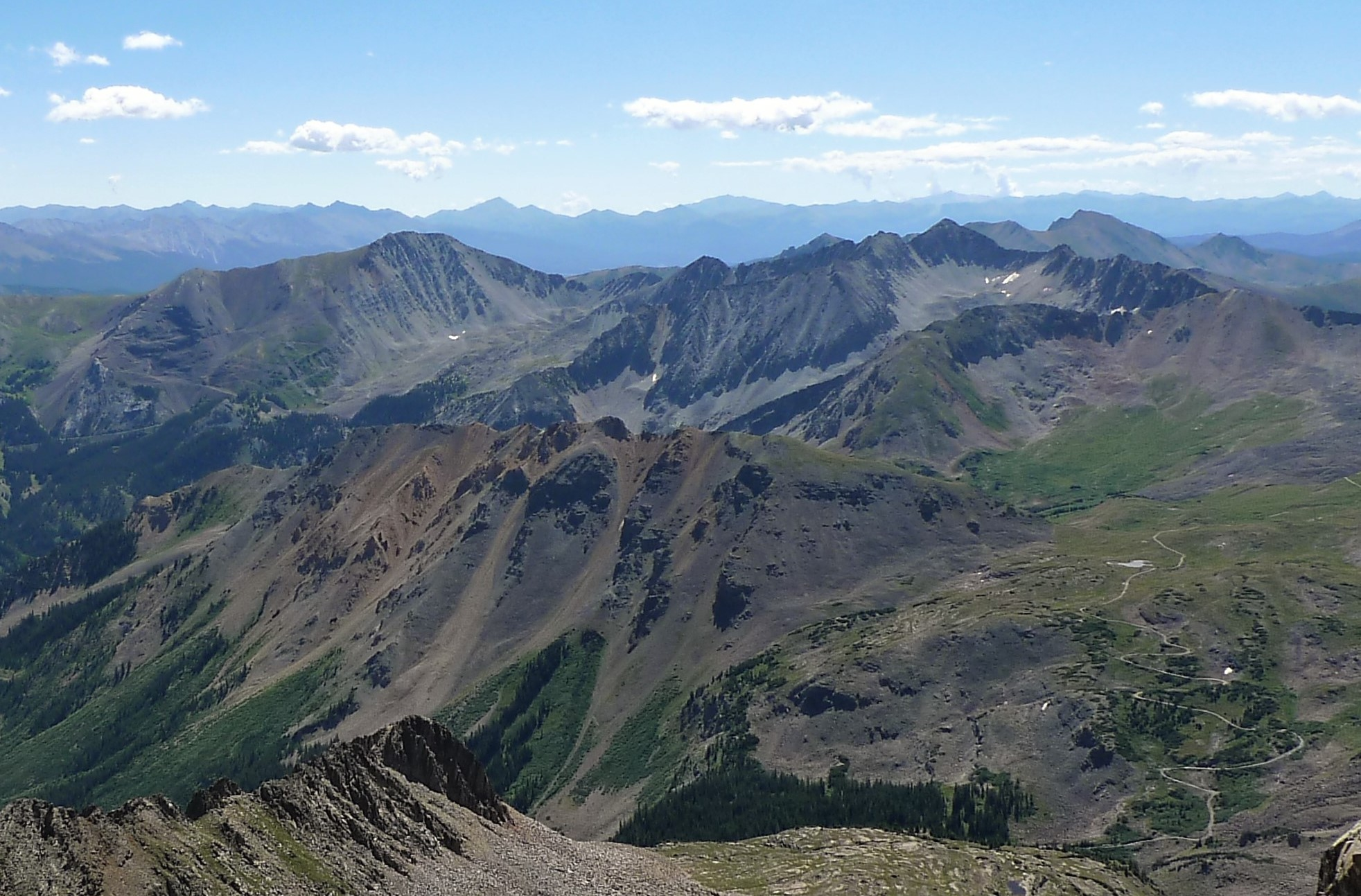
Taylor Peak (left) and Star Peak (right) seen from Castle Peak.
Greg Mace Peak centered below.

== See also ==
- List of mountain peaks of Colorado
- Thirteener
