= Sheriff Mountain =

Mountain in Montana

Coordinates: 45°36′39″N 112°56′01″W

Sheriff Mountain is a summit in Beaverhead County, Montana, in the United States. With an elevation of 9,787 feet (2,983 m), Sheriff Mountain is the 284th highest summit in the state of Montana.
