= Bloody Dick Peak =

Mountain in Montana, United States

- Location within Montana

Highest point
- Elevation: 9,822 ft (2,994 m)
- Prominence: 2,217 ft (676 m)
- Parent peak: Goldstone Mountain
- Coordinates: 45°09′12″N 113°19′22″W

Geography
- Location: Beaverhead County, Montana. U.S.
- Parent range: Beaverhead Mountains
- Topo map: USGS Peterson Lake

Bloody Dick Peak is a summit in Beaverhead County, Montana, in the United States. With an elevation of 9,822 feet (2,994 m), Bloody Dick Peak is the 283rd tallest mountain in Montana.
