= 2025 Montana wildfires =

Natural disasters in the USA

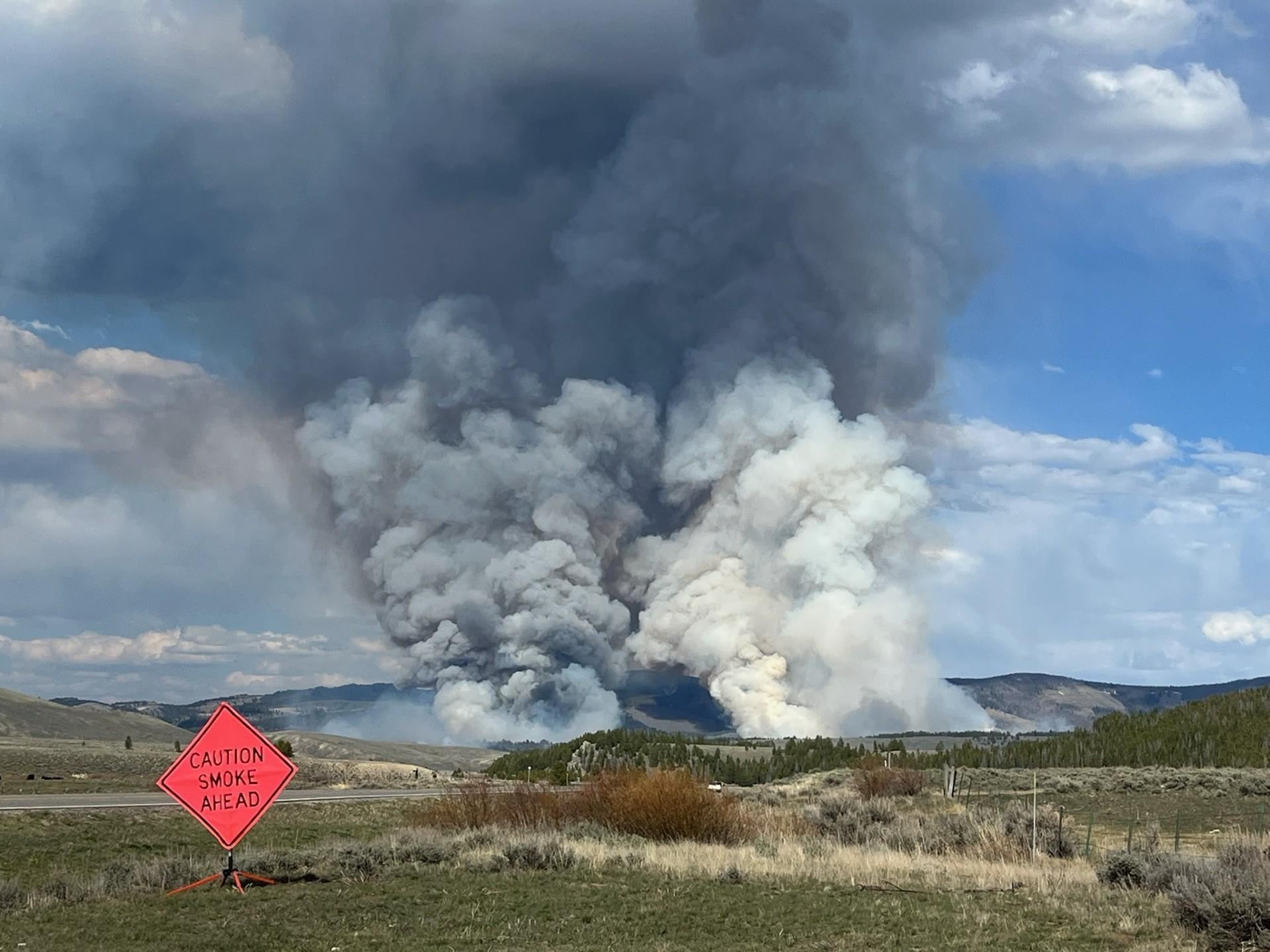
- Smoke from the Sawlog Fire on May 3

Statistics
- Total fires: 2,424
- Total area: 75,099 acres (30,391 ha; 117.342 sq mi)

A series of wildfires burned throughout the U.S. state of Montana during 2025.

== Background ==
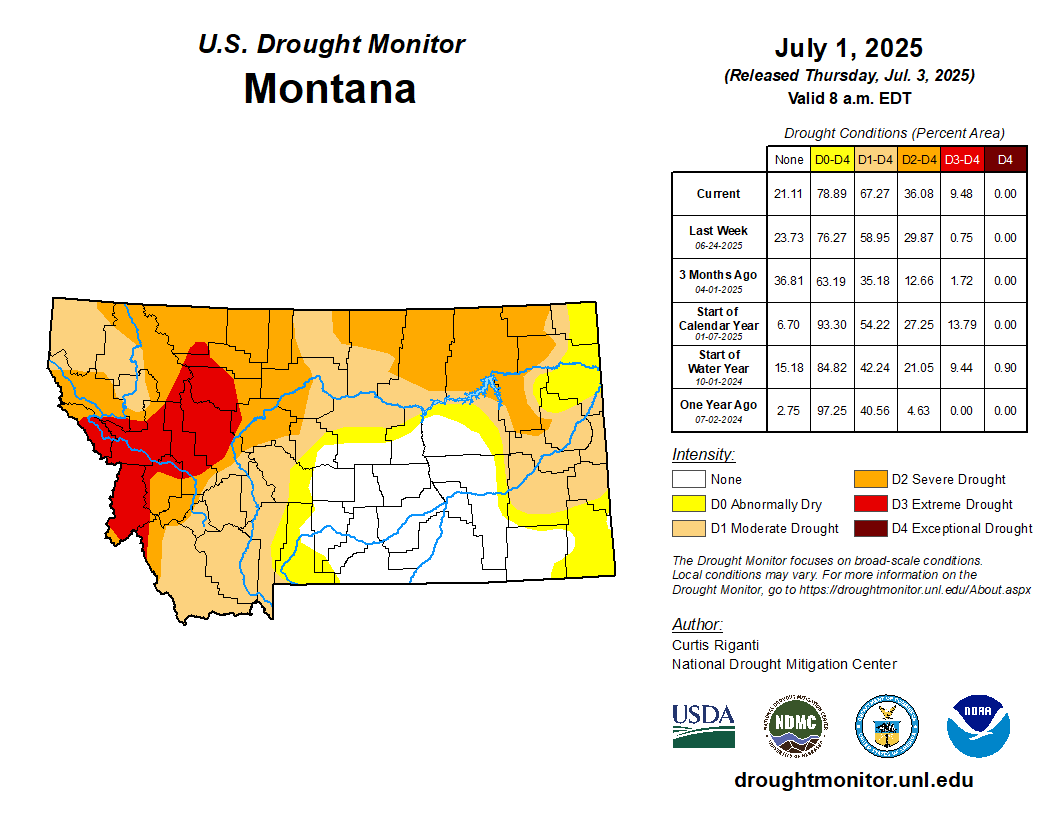
Montana Drought Monitor on July 1, 2025

While "fire season" in Montana varies every year based on weather conditions, most wildfires occur in between May and October. Wildfires are influenced by above-average temperatures and dry conditions that influence drought. When vegetation dries out earlier in the season, wildfires are more likely to start and spread. The leading cause of wildfires in Montana is burning debris. The spread rate of wildfires is affected by the buildup of fuels.

== Summary ==
Despite a worsening drought, the number of acres burned in Montana by July 24 was significantly less than land managers expected. While there had been a similar number of starts compared to last year, (1,116 on July 21, 2025 with 1,069 one year prior), there had been significantly less area burned (92,000 acres (37,000 ha) on July 21, 2024 compared to just 17,000 acres (6,900 ha) the same time in 2025). This was mostly due to heavy-precipitation storms coming from Northwest United States. It moistened terrain, making it less favorable to fire spread. Storms hit areas that needed moisture. However, officials remained the most concerned for Bitterroot Valley from forest fuels and inaccessible terrain, Gallatin, Madison, and Jefferson counties due to population growth, the Central Montana grasslands due to grass fuels, and the Eastern plains due to heavy grass growth. Main fire concerns are hot temperatures.

Lightning caused several wildfires throughout Southwestern Montana, although several wildfires were human-caused, as well. Thunderstorms moved through areas under red flag warnings and heat advisories, starting several large wildfires (including the Horn, Bivens Creek, Cloudrest, Windy Rock, and McAllister fires). Temperatures were in excess of 90 °F, and strong thunderstorms posed threats The fires in Madison County were the most severe in terms of smoke and spread. The Horn Fire prompted an evacuation order and closed several residential roads and a campground, while the McAllister Fire prompted an evacuation warning near U.S. Route 87.

By early October, mountain snow and cooler temperatures essentially brought an end to fire season. By October 8, just over 76,000 acres (31,000 ha) had burned in the state, the fourth-lowest in fifteen years. However, the total number of fire starts was above average, at 2,200, the sixth highest in fifteen years. Overall, the summer was both cooler and wetter than average and quick response times to new fire starts decreased the number of days with poor air quality than in the past.

== List of wildfires ==
The following is a list of fires that burned more than 1,000 acres (400 ha), or produced significant structural damage or casualties.

Name	County	Acres	Start date	Containment date (Note: Containment means that fire crews have established and secured control lines around the fire's perimeter. These lines are artificial barriers, like trenches or cleared vegetation, designed to stop the fire's spread, or natural barriers like rivers. Containment reflects progress in managing the fire but does not necessarily mean the fire is starved of fuel, under control, or put out.)	Notes	Ref
Sawlog	Beaverhead	2,030	May 1	May 19	Undetermined cause. Burned 15 miles (24 km) northeast of Wisdom. Cost $2.5 million in suppression.	
Wilder	Fergus	3,450	July 2	July 22	Lightning-caused. Burned 27 miles (43 km) northeast of Roy.	
Tullock	Big Horn	1,469	August 4	August 8	Unknown cause. Burned 13 miles (21 km) northeast of Hardin.	
Mission Butte	Big Horn	6,149	August 12		Unknown cause. Burned 3 miles (4.8 km) east of St. Xavier.	
Summer Springs	Treasure	2,568	August 13	August 23	Lightning-caused. Burned 13 miles (21 km) southeast of Custer.	
Pony Creek	Rosebud	1,062	August 13	August 15	Lightning-caused. Burned 4 miles (6.4 km) east of Colstrip.	
Horn	Madison	2,800	August 13	August 22	Lightning-caused. Burned 17 miles (27 km) northwest of West Yellowstone and prompting pre-evacuations near Madison River Ranch.	
Bivens Creek	Madison	2,126	August 13	September 8	Unknown cause. Burned 10 miles (16 km) east of Sheridan.	
Cloudrest	Madison	3,224	August 14	October 31	Lightning-caused. Burned 15 miles (24 km) northwest of Virginia City and prompted an evacuation warning.	
Windy Rock	Powell	6,175	August 14	November 6	Lightning-caused. Burning 15 miles (24 km) northeast of Drummond.	
McAllister	Madison	3,560	August 16	August 27	Lightning-caused. Burned 4 miles (6.4 km) north of McAllister. Prompted evacuations.	
Knowles	Sanders	3,816	August 17	September 10	Human-caused. Burned 11 miles (18 km) east of Plains.	
Isabella	Sanders	1,411	August 31	October 24	Lightning-caused. Closed parts of Kootenai National Forest along with the smaller Lost Girl Fire.	
Timber Butte	Beaverhead	2,245	September 3	September 25	Unknown cause. Burned 6 miles (9.7 km) west of Dell.	
Salmon Forks	Flathead, Powell	2,454	September 12		Lightning-caused. Burned 19 miles (31 km) east of Condon.	

Perimeters of 2025 Montana wildfires (map data)

== See also ==
- 2025 Canadian wildfires
- 2025 Idaho wildfires
- 2025 North Dakota wildfires
- 2025 South Dakota wildfires
- 2025 United States wildfires
- 2025 Wyoming wildfires
- Wildfires in 2025
