= 2024 Montana wildfires =

Natural disasters in the USA

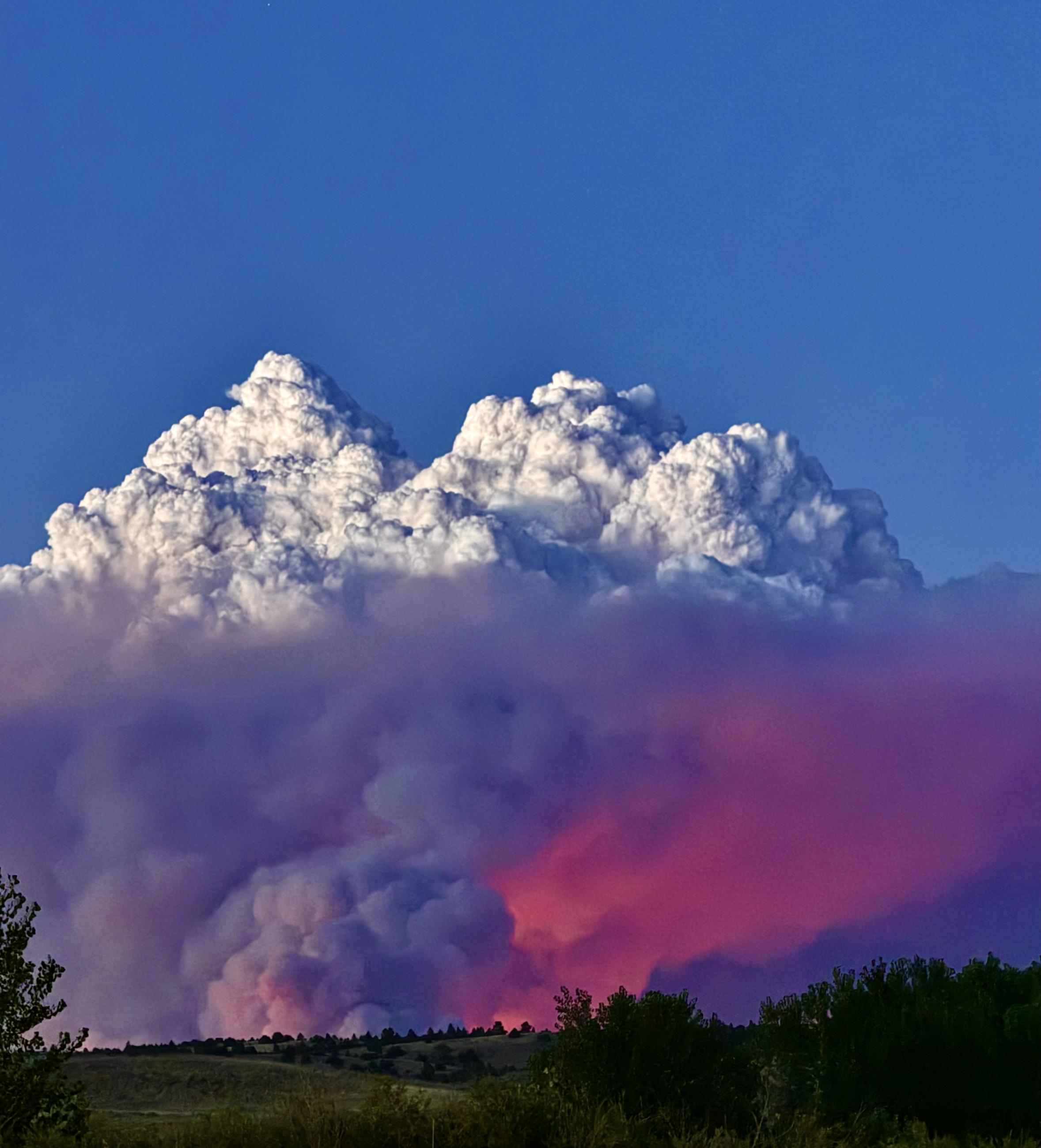
- Smoke from the Remington Fire during sunset on August 23

Statistics
- Total fires: 2,131
- Total area: 157,845 acres (63,878 ha)

Impacts
- Deaths: 1 firefighter

The 2024 Montana wildfire season was a series of wildfires that burned throughout the U.S. state of Montana during 2024.

== Background ==
While "fire season" in Montana varies every year based on weather conditions, most wildfires occur in between May and October. Wildfires are influenced by above average temperatures and dry conditions that influence drought. When vegetation dries out earlier in the season, wildfires are more likely to start and spread. The leading cause of wildfires in Montana is burning debris. The spread rate of wildfires is affected by the buildup of fuels.

== Summary ==
Wildfire season had a slow, quiet start, most likely from some precipitation in May, but June was drier than average. In July, temperatures had increased as high as the triple digits and there was little precipitation. Subsequently, wildfires were now starting all around the state. Dry thunderstorms ignited the Deadman, McGhee, Prairie, and Four Mile fires. In August, a weather pattern change resulted in cooler temperatures and above-average precipitation. Firefighters were able to control the fires that began in July and new wildfires were easily kept from getting out of control. In Eastern Montana, drought lasted into early November, with some areas of Yellowstone County in moderate to extreme droughts. However, in Western Montana, cold temperatures and snow had essentially brought an end to wildfire season. A cold front had moved into the area. Once snowfall had ended fire season in all of the state, prescribed burns and pile burns began to remove future fuels. Approximately 700 wildfires were sparked by lightning, while about 1,300 were human-caused.

While fighting the Horse Gulch Fire, 45-year-old pilot Juliana Turchetti's water scooper crashed into a mountain, and she was killed upon impact. Wildfires contributed to poor air quality across the states along with wildfires in Idaho.

== List of wildfires ==
The following is a list of fires that burned more than 1,000 acres (400 ha), or produced significant structural damage or casualties.

Name	County	Acres	Start date	Containment date (Note: Containment means that fire crews have established and secured control lines around the fire's perimeter. These lines are artificial barriers, like trenches or cleared vegetation, designed to stop the fire's spread, or natural barriers like rivers. Containment reflects progress in managing the fire but does not necessarily mean the fire is starved of fuel, under control, or put out.)	Notes	Ref
Horse Gulch	Lewis and Clark, Broadwater	15,167	July 9	July 26	Human-caused. Burned about 0.5 miles (0.80 km) north of Canyon Ferry Dam. Water scooper pilot killed while fighting the fire after plane crashed into a mountain.	
Deadman	Rosebud, Big Horn	19,982	July 12	July 23	Lightning-caused. Part of the Deadman Complex.	
McGhee	Rosebud	19,223	July 12	July 24	Lightning-caused. Part of the Deadman Complex.	
Prairie	Rosebud	6,540	July 12	July 23	Lightning-caused. Part of the Deadman Complex.	
Four Mile	Big Horn	2,082	July 12	July 23	Lightning-caused. Part of the Deadman Complex.	
Line Creek	Powder River	2,496	July 12	August 14	Lightning-caused.	
Miller Peak	Missoula	2,724	July 14	August 20	Caused by lightning.	
Railroad	Ravalli	1,583	July 25	November 6	Lightning-caused. Burned about 26 miles (42 km) southeast of Hamilton.	
Johnson	Ravalli	8,438	July 25	November 5	Lightning-caused. Burned near Sula.	
Grouse	Beaverhead	6,228	July 26	October 28	Lightning-caused. Burned about 10 miles (16 km) southwest of Wise River.	
Hopkin	Carter	1,129	August 4	August 5		
Shirley	Powder River	1,230	August 5	August 9	Lightning-caused. Burned in Gallatin National Forest.	
Stewart	Powder River	1,150	August 5	August 7		
Daly	Ravalli	11,386	August 18	November 6		
Ratio Mountain	Jefferson	1,966	August 18	October 31	Caused by lightning. Burned about 15 miles (24 km) northwest of Whitehall.	
Barber Draw	Big Horn	6,739	August 21	August 27	Lightning-caused. Burned north of the Tongue River Reservoir and prompted evacuations in the area.	
Big Hollow	Beaverhead	3,435	August 23	September 5	Likely cause by lightning and burned about 13 miles (21 km) west of Grant.	
Chalky Point	Big Horn, Rosebud	1,200	August 22	August 25	Naturally caused. Burned about 20 miles (32 km) northwest of Lame Deer.	
Sharrott Creek	Ravalli	3,204	August 23	2024	Lightning-caused.	
Homestead	Sheridan	1,000	September 14	September 25		
Meridian	Madison	3,900	October 8	2024		

Perimeters of 2024 Montana wildfires (map data)

== See also ==
- 2024 United States wildfires
