= Dewey, Montana =

- Census-designated place
- Location within Montana Location within the United States
- Coordinates: 45°46′35″N 112°51′19″W
- Country: United States
- State: Montana
- County: Beaverhead

Area
  - Total: 0.27 sq mi (0.69 km^{2})
  - Land: 0.26 sq mi (0.68 km^{2})
  - Water: 0.0039 sq mi (0.01 km^{2})
- Elevation: 5,515 ft (1,681 m)

Population (2020)
  - Total: 25
  - Density: 94.8/sq mi (36.62/km^{2})
- Time zone: UTC-7 (Mountain (MST))
  - Summer (DST): UTC-6 (MDT)
- ZIP Code: 59727 (Divide)
- Area code: 406
- FIPS code: 30-20725
- GNIS feature ID: 2804244

Dewey is an unincorporated community and census-designated place (CDP) in Beaverhead County, Montana, United States. It is in the northeast part of the county, on the south side of the Big Hole River, and bordered to the north, across the river, by Silver Bow County. Montana Highway 43 passes through Dewey, leading east 7 miles (11 km) to Interstate 15 at Divide, and west up the Big Hole River valley 5.5 miles (8.9 km) to Wise River and 44 miles (71 km) to Wisdom.

As of the 2020 census, Dewey had a population of 25.

Dewey was first listed as a CDP prior to the 2020 census.

== Demographics ==
Historical population
Census	Pop.	Note	%±
2020	25		—
U.S. Decennial Census
