= List of lakes of Beaverhead County, Montana =

There are at least 166 named lakes and reservoirs in Beaverhead County, Montana.

== Lakes ==
- Ajax Lake, 45°19′47″N 113°43′40″W, el. 8,527 feet (2,599 m)
- Albino Lake, 45°20′11″N 113°44′06″W, el. 8,822 feet (2,689 m)
- Alpine Lake, 45°09′37″N 113°34′36″W, el. 8,602 feet (2,622 m)
- Anchor Lake, 45°26′02″N 113°00′05″W, el. 9,144 feet (2,787 m)
- Antelope Pond, 44°38′58″N 111°43′47″W, el. 6,621 feet (2,018 m)
- Baldy Lake, 45°36′11″N 113°16′25″W, el. 8,560 feet (2,610 m)
- Barb Lake, 45°28′33″N 112°56′44″W, el. 9,190 feet (2,800 m)
- Bear Lake, 45°30′29″N 113°14′42″W, el. 7,592 feet (2,314 m)
- Berry Lake, 45°13′00″N 113°37′35″W, el. 8,796 feet (2,681 m)
- Black Lion Lake, 45°37′35″N 112°59′51″W, el. 8,806 feet (2,684 m)
- Blair Lake, 44°33′50″N 111°34′12″W, el. 8,110 feet (2,470 m)
- Blanchard Pond, 45°16′31″N 113°26′44″W, el. 6,831 feet (2,082 m)
- Boatman Lake, 45°23′19″N 112°58′35″W, el. 8,189 feet (2,496 m)
- Bobcat Lakes, 45°36′55″N 113°13′39″W, el. 8,428 feet (2,569 m)
- Bobs Lake, 45°39′41″N 112°59′46″W, el. 8,553 feet (2,607 m)
- Cattle Gulch Lake, 45°43′08″N 112°51′12″W, el. 8,182 feet (2,494 m)
- Chain Lake, 45°24′47″N 113°00′21″W, el. 9,705 feet (2,958 m)
- Chan Lake, 45°25′36″N 113°00′19″W, el. 9,029 feet (2,752 m)
- Cherry Lake, 45°34′23″N 112°54′24″W, el. 8,822 feet (2,689 m)
- Conklin Lake, 44°41′51″N 111°31′49″W, el. 6,670 feet (2,030 m)
- Continental Lake (Montana), 45°51′23″N 113°35′03″W, el. 7,782 feet (2,372 m)
- Cooks Lake, 44°46′16″N 112°21′12″W, el. 8,402 feet (2,561 m)
- Cowbone Lake, 45°09′31″N 113°34′31″W, el. 8,569 feet (2,612 m)
- Coyote Lake, 44°32′42″N 112°59′31″W, el. 8,264 feet (2,519 m)
- Crescent Lake, 45°34′44″N 113°00′12″W, el. 8,786 feet (2,678 m)
- Crystal Lake, 45°51′26″N 113°34′27″W, el. 7,825 feet (2,385 m)
- Dad Creek Lake, 44°46′37″N 113°07′38″W, el. 8,901 feet (2,713 m)
- Darkhorse Lake, 45°09′46″N 113°34′59″W, el. 8,694 feet (2,650 m)
- Deadman Lake, 44°26′27″N 112°51′38″W, el. 7,903 feet (2,409 m)
- Deerhead Lake, 45°26′14″N 112°54′55″W, el. 7,588 feet (2,313 m)
- Dingley Lakes, 45°26′50″N 113°02′43″W, el. 8,901 feet (2,713 m)
- Dollar Lake, 45°23′53″N 113°00′00″W, el. 9,183 feet (2,799 m)
- Elbow Lake, 45°35′17″N 113°16′11″W, el. 8,665 feet (2,641 m)
- Elk Lake, 44°40′55″N 111°36′51″W, el. 6,676 feet (2,035 m)
- Elkhorn Lake, 45°27′31″N 113°01′08″W, el. 8,701 feet (2,652 m)
- Englejard Lake, 45°17′42″N 113°33′52″W, el. 7,319 feet (2,231 m)
- Ferguson Lake, 45°47′50″N 113°07′51″W, el. 7,533 feet (2,296 m)
- Fish Creek Lake, 44°44′54″N 111°56′25″W, el. 7,559 feet (2,304 m)
- Foolhen Lake, 45°48′30″N 113°06′40″W, el. 7,165 feet (2,184 m)
- Glacier Lake, 45°28′07″N 112°59′37″W, el. 8,822 feet (2,689 m)
- Goldstone Lake, 45°08′45″N 113°33′36″W, el. 8,861 feet (2,701 m)
- Gorge Lakes, 45°29′24″N 112°57′55″W, el. 9,183 feet (2,799 m)
- Grace Lake, 45°36′38″N 112°59′34″W, el. 8,825 feet (2,690 m)
- Granite Lake, 45°34′43″N 112°54′17″W, el. 8,957 feet (2,730 m)
- Grassy Lake, 45°36′38″N 113°14′34″W, el. 8,268 feet (2,520 m)
- Grayling Lake, 45°34′45″N 112°59′06″W, el. 8,697 feet (2,651 m)
- Green Lake, 45°33′56″N 112°54′34″W, el. 8,819 feet (2,688 m)
- Grouse Lakes, 45°42′42″N 113°06′44″W, el. 8,419 feet (2,566 m)
- Hall Lake, 45°28′03″N 113°01′59″W, el. 8,875 feet (2,705 m)
- Hamby Lake, 45°15′03″N 113°38′34″W, el. 8,097 feet (2,468 m)
- Harkness Lakes, 44°28′06″N 112°56′48″W, el. 8,123 feet (2,476 m)
- Harrison Lake, 45°15′57″N 113°13′03″W, el. 8,638 feet (2,633 m)
- Heart Lake, 45°18′33″N 113°39′55″W, el. 9,235 feet (2,815 m)
- Hidden Lake, 45°20′35″N 113°41′54″W, el. 8,097 feet (2,468 m)
- Highup Lake, 45°12′02″N 113°36′31″W, el. 9,199 feet (2,804 m)
- Hopkin Lake, 45°27′47″N 113°02′14″W, el. 8,888 feet (2,709 m)
- Horseshoe Lake, 45°01′24″N 112°44′41″W, el. 6,716 feet (2,047 m)
- Ice Pond, 45°23′36″N 113°29′07″W, el. 6,476 feet (1,974 m)
- Janhke Lake, 45°11′30″N 113°35′20″W, el. 8,694 feet (2,650 m)
- Johanna Lake, 45°45′17″N 113°08′31″W, el. 8,107 feet (2,471 m)
- Kelly Lake, 45°18′37″N 113°38′08″W, el. 8,543 feet (2,604 m)
- Lake Abundance, 45°35′06″N 113°00′15″W, el. 8,747 feet (2,666 m)
- Lake Agnes, 45°30′46″N 112°50′40″W, el. 7,493 feet (2,284 m)
- Lake Canyon Lake, 44°48′48″N 113°05′31″W, el. 7,329 feet (2,234 m)
- Lake Geneva, 45°15′07″N 113°39′19″W, el. 8,455 feet (2,577 m)
- Lake of the Woods, 45°34′58″N 113°14′08″W, el. 8,451 feet (2,576 m)
- Lena Lake, 45°21′00″N 113°43′27″W, el. 8,350 feet (2,550 m)
- Lillian Lake, 44°33′40″N 111°32′24″W, el. 7,802 feet (2,378 m)
- Lily Lake, 45°25′57″N 112°57′21″W, el. 7,871 feet (2,399 m)
- Lily Lake, 45°37′28″N 113°19′44″W, el. 7,172 feet (2,186 m)
- Lion Lake, 45°49′34″N 113°27′16″W, el. 6,384 feet (1,946 m)
- Lion Lake, 45°50′27″N 113°34′18″W, el. 7,641 feet (2,329 m)
- Lion Lake, 45°34′25″N 112°59′09″W, el. 8,822 feet (2,689 m)
- Little Lake, 45°18′19″N 113°41′52″W, el. 8,733 feet (2,662 m)
- Long Branch Lake, 45°31′43″N 112°53′49″W, el. 7,720 feet (2,350 m)
- Long Lake, 45°31′56″N 112°53′34″W, el. 7,723 feet (2,354 m)
- Lovell Lake, 45°45′27″N 113°13′19″W, el. 6,991 feet (2,131 m)
- Lovells Lake, 45°06′39″N 112°42′49″W, el. 5,495 feet (1,675 m)
- Lower Miner Lakes, 45°19′31″N 113°34′30″W, el. 6,975 feet (2,126 m)
- Lower Red Rock Lake, 44°38′12″N 111°50′42″W, el. 6,611 feet (2,015 m)
- MacDonald Pond, 44°38′53″N 111°39′08″W, el. 6,640 feet (2,020 m)
- Maurice Pond, 45°36′58″N 113°05′31″W, el. 6,565 feet (2,001 m)
- May Lake, 45°25′17″N 112°59′26″W, el. 8,711 feet (2,655 m)
- Minneopa Lake, 45°23′34″N 112°57′50″W, el. 8,179 feet (2,493 m)
- Morrison Lake, 44°36′06″N 113°02′14″W, el. 8,169 feet (2,490 m)
- Mosquito Lake, 45°50′46″N 113°34′25″W, el. 7,749 feet (2,362 m)
- Mud Lake, 44°36′32″N 112°10′52″W, el. 6,624 feet (2,019 m)
- Mud Lake, 45°11′10″N 113°26′35″W, el. 8,074 feet (2,461 m)
- Mud Lake, 45°39′12″N 113°23′44″W, el. 6,106 feet (1,861 m)
- Mulkey Lake, 45°21′27″N 113°28′05″W, el. 6,562 feet (2,000 m)
- Mussigbrod Lake, 45°47′43″N 113°37′00″W, el. 6,496 feet (1,980 m)
- Mystic Lake, 45°52′04″N 113°33′02″W, el. 7,920 feet (2,410 m)
- Nymphaea Lake, 45°44′13″N 113°39′27″W, el. 6,391 feet (1,948 m)
- Odell Lake, 45°34′35″N 113°14′01″W, el. 8,314 feet (2,534 m)
- Ovis Lake, 45°29′12″N 113°44′38″W, el. 8,629 feet (2,630 m)
- Pear Lake (Montana), 45°25′30″N 112°59′42″W, el. 8,684 feet (2,647 m)
- Peterson Lake, 45°10′52″N 113°18′55″W, el. 7,812 feet (2,381 m)
- Phlox Lake, 45°49′59″N 113°42′06″W, el. 8,172 feet (2,491 m)
- Pintler Lake, 45°50′26″N 113°26′28″W, el. 6,306 feet (1,922 m)
- Pioneer Lake, 45°11′57″N 113°36′02″W, el. 8,737 feet (2,663 m)
- Poison Lakes, 44°50′41″N 112°54′44″W, el. 8,150 feet (2,480 m)
- Polaris Lake, 45°23′18″N 113°02′05″W, el. 8,195 feet (2,498 m)
- Rainbow Lake, 45°31′09″N 112°52′37″W, el. 7,871 feet (2,399 m)
- Ridge Lake, 45°17′04″N 113°39′46″W, el. 8,455 feet (2,577 m)
- Rock Island Lakes, 45°17′56″N 113°40′59″W, el. 8,337 feet (2,541 m)
- Sand Lake, 45°37′18″N 113°17′04″W, el. 8,281 feet (2,524 m)
- Sawed Cabin Lake, 45°55′53″N 113°30′43″W, el. 8,432 feet (2,570 m)
- Sawtooth Lake, 45°25′56″N 113°01′58″W, el. 8,517 feet (2,596 m)
- Schulz Lakes, 45°32′47″N 112°59′09″W, el. 8,678 feet (2,645 m)
- Schwinegar Lake, 45°35′16″N 113°14′37″W, el. 8,225 feet (2,507 m)
- Scott Lake, 45°21′49″N 113°00′59″W, el. 8,707 feet (2,654 m)
- Selway Lake, 45°09′43″N 113°21′32″W, el. 7,677 feet (2,340 m)
- Shambow Pond, 44°35′38″N 111°44′55″W, el. 6,630 feet (2,020 m)
- Skinner Lake, 45°10′28″N 113°30′43″W, el. 7,369 feet (2,246 m)
- Skytop Lake, 45°12′00″N 113°36′37″W, el. 9,163 feet (2,793 m)
- Slag-a-melt Lakes, 45°21′53″N 113°43′13″W, el. 8,573 feet (2,613 m)
- Steer Lake, 45°29′46″N 113°17′23″W, el. 7,421 feet (2,262 m)
- Stewart Lake, 45°31′15″N 113°16′25″W, el. 7,506 feet (2,288 m)
- Stone Lakes, 45°41′15″N 113°14′59″W, el. 8,478 feet (2,584 m)
- Surprise Lake, 45°50′10″N 113°42′06″W, el. 8,192 feet (2,497 m)
- Swan Lake, 44°37′53″N 111°43′30″W, el. 6,614 feet (2,016 m)
- Swift Lake, 45°07′52″N 113°33′53″W, el. 8,865 feet (2,702 m)
- Tahepia Lake, 45°33′09″N 112°58′38″W, el. 8,904 feet (2,714 m)
- Teacup Lake, 45°34′06″N 112°59′49″W, el. 8,943 feet (2,726 m)
- Tendoy Lake, 45°31′02″N 112°57′56″W, el. 9,226 feet (2,812 m)
- Tent Lake, 45°24′09″N 112°58′27″W, el. 8,386 feet (2,556 m)
- Timberline Lake, 45°12′40″N 113°37′24″W, el. 9,134 feet (2,784 m)
- Torrey Lake, 45°28′00″N 112°58′13″W, el. 8,970 feet (2,730 m)
- Trapper Lake, 45°35′02″N 112°55′59″W, el. 8,563 feet (2,610 m)
- Trusty Lake, 45°42′33″N 112°51′57″W, el. 7,736 feet (2,358 m)
- Twin Lakes, 45°24′02″N 112°59′44″W, el. 8,878 feet (2,706 m)
- Twin Lakes, 45°24′41″N 113°41′40″W, el. 7,244 feet (2,208 m)
- Upper Miner Lakes, 45°15′47″N 113°40′33″W, el. 8,035 feet (2,449 m)
- Upper Red Rock Lake, 44°36′54″N 111°43′54″W, el. 6,614 feet (2,016 m)
- Van Houten Lake, 45°14′43″N 113°28′43″W, el. 7,024 feet (2,141 m)
- Vera Lake, 45°34′44″N 112°58′28″W, el. 8,717 feet (2,657 m)
- Violet Lake (Montana), 45°49′55″N 113°42′24″W, el. 8,274 feet (2,522 m)
- Waukena Lake, 45°33′09″N 112°57′21″W, el. 8,678 feet (2,645 m)
- Widgeon Pond, 44°38′32″N 111°39′03″W, el. 6,644 feet (2,025 m)

== Reservoirs ==
- Anchor Lake (Montana), 45°26′00″N 112°59′57″W, el. 9,153 feet (2,790 m)
- Blomquist Reservoir, 45°20′41″N 112°39′05″W, el. 5,125 feet (1,562 m)
- Bond Lake, 45°26′43″N 112°52′30″W, el. 7,146 feet (2,178 m)
- Boot Lake, 45°25′52″N 112°58′27″W, el. 8,245 feet (2,513 m)
- Brownes Lake, 45°31′42″N 112°49′03″W, el. 6,565 feet (2,001 m)
- Canyon Lake, 45°35′19″N 112°59′39″W, el. 8,399 feet (2,560 m)
- Clark Canyon Reservoir, 44°59′01″N 112°51′47″W, el. 5,545 feet (1,690 m)
- Deerhead Lake, 45°26′06″N 112°54′57″W, el. 7,703 feet (2,348 m)
- Dillon Reservoir, 45°14′38″N 112°47′44″W, el. 5,686 feet (1,733 m)
- Estler Lake, 45°22′18″N 112°58′23″W, el. 7,864 feet (2,397 m)
- Fish Reservoir, 44°44′54″N 111°56′45″W, el. 7,595 feet (2,315 m)
- Hirschy Reservoir, 45°32′18″N 113°37′21″W, el. 6,548 feet (1,996 m)
- Kelley Reservoir, 45°19′40″N 112°56′41″W, el. 7,011 feet (2,137 m)
- Kelly Reservoir, 45°19′36″N 112°56′45″W, el. 7,011 feet (2,137 m)
- Keystone Reservoir, 44°49′47″N 113°01′36″W, el. 6,516 feet (1,986 m)
- Lake Agnes, 45°31′00″N 112°50′09″W, el. 7,500 feet (2,300 m)
- Lima Reservoir, 44°39′25″N 112°22′09″W, el. 6,568 feet (2,002 m)
- Morgan Jones Lake, 45°33′07″N 113°48′11″W, el. 6,785 feet (2,068 m)
- Mussigbrod Lake, 45°47′30″N 113°36′39″W, el. 6,532 feet (1,991 m)
- Overnight Reservoir, 45°19′40″N 112°43′32″W, el. 5,479 feet (1,670 m)
- Pear Lake (Montana), 45°25′30″N 112°59′33″W, el. 8,684 feet (2,647 m)
- Reservoir Lake, 45°07′23″N 113°27′06″W, el. 7,077 feet (2,157 m)
- Reservoir Lake, 45°07′42″N 113°27′27″W, el. 7,070 feet (2,150 m)
- Schultz Reservoir, 45°30′49″N 113°41′55″W, el. 7,260 feet (2,210 m)
- Tub Lake, 45°25′04″N 112°59′59″W, el. 9,094 feet (2,772 m)
- Waukena Lake, 45°33′12″N 112°57′03″W, el. 8,688 feet (2,648 m)
- Widgeon Pond, 44°38′12″N 111°39′21″W, el. 6,647 feet (2,026 m)

== See also ==
- List of lakes in Montana
