= Maverick Mountain, Montana =

- Census-designated place
- Location within Montana Location within the United States
- Coordinates: 45°24′59″N 113°06′51″W
- Country: United States
- State: Montana
- County: Beaverhead

Area
  - Total: 1.85 sq mi (4.79 km^{2})
  - Land: 1.85 sq mi (4.79 km^{2})
  - Water: 0 sq mi (0.00 km^{2})
- Elevation: 6,532 ft (1,991 m)

Population (2020)
  - Total: 67
  - Density: 36.2/sq mi (13.99/km^{2})
- Time zone: UTC-7 (Mountain (MST))
  - Summer (DST): UTC-6 (MDT)
- ZIP Code: 59746 (Polaris)
- Area code: 406
- FIPS code: 30-48585
- GNIS feature ID: 2804263

Maverick Mountain is a census-designated place (CDP) in Beaverhead County, Montana, United States, consisting of residences in the valley of Grasshopper Creek at the base of Maverick Mountain Ski Area. It is in the northern part of the county, along the Pioneer Mountains Scenic Byway, 4 miles (6 km) north of Polaris, the nearest post office, and 35 miles (56 km) northwest of Interstate 15 at Dillon, the Beaverhead county seat. Maverick Mountain, for which the CDP and the ski area are named, rises to a summit elevation of 8,722 feet (2,658 m) to the northwest. The scenic byway continues north 34 miles (55 km) to the town of Wise River in the Big Hole River valley.

As of the 2020 census, Maverick Mountain had a population of 67.

Maverick Mountain was first listed as a CDP prior to the 2020 census.

== Demographics ==
Historical population
Census	Pop.	Note	%±
2020	67		—
U.S. Decennial Census
