= Wise River =

River in Montana, United States

- Location of mouth

Location
- Country: Beaverhead County, Montana

Physical characteristics
- Mouth
  - coordinates: 45°47′56″N 112°56′47″W
  - elevation: 5,607 feet (1,709 m)
- Length: 30 miles (48 km)
- Discharge
  - location: near Wise River
  - average: 183 cu ft/s (5.2 m^{3}/s)

Basin features
- River system: Missouri River

The Wise River is a tributary of the Big Hole River, approximately 30 mi (48 km) long, in southwestern Montana in the United States. It rises in the Beaverhead National Forest in the Pioneer Mountains in Beaverhead County. It flows NNW through the mountains and joins the Big Hole near the town of Wise River. The river has also been known as Elkhorn Creek.

The river is a popular destination for fly fishing. The Wise is a Class II river for stream access for recreational purposes.

== See also ==
- List of rivers of Montana
- Montana Stream Access Law
