= Lakeview, Montana =

Unincorporated community in Montana, United States

- Census-Designated Place
- Interactive map of Lakeview, Montana
- Coordinates: 44°36′08″N 111°48′45″W
- Country: United States
- State: Montana
- County: Beaverhead

Area
  - Total: 0.77 sq mi (1.99 km^{2})
  - Land: 0.77 sq mi (1.99 km^{2})
  - Water: 0 sq mi (0.00 km^{2})
- Elevation: 6,759 ft (2,060 m)

Population (2020)
  - Total: 15
  - Density: 19.5/sq mi (7.52/km^{2})
- FIPS code: 30-42100
- GNIS feature ID: 2804262

Lakeview is an unincorporated community in Beaverhead County, Montana, United States. As of the 2020 census, Lakeview had a population of 15. Lakeview lies along Southside Centennial Road, approximately halfway between Lima to the west and West Yellowstone to the east. Originally named Shambow, for George H. Shambow, one of the area’s earliest residents and its first postmaster, this Centennial Valley town was renamed Magdalen and finally, in the late 1890s, Lakeview.

Red Rock Lakes National Wildlife Refuge is nearby.

== Climate ==
Climate data for Lakeview, Montana, 1991–2020 normals, extremes 1942–present: 6710ft (2045m)
| Month | Jan | Feb | Mar | Apr | May | Jun | Jul | Aug | Sep | Oct | Nov | Dec | Year |
|---|---|---|---|---|---|---|---|---|---|---|---|---|---|
| Record high °F (°C) | 50 (10) | 52 (11) | 59 (15) | 75 (24) | 82 (28) | 91 (33) | 95 (35) | 94 (34) | 97 (36) | 85 (29) | 67 (19) | 55 (13) | 97 (36) |
| Mean maximum °F (°C) | 38.4 (3.6) | 39.6 (4.2) | 49.5 (9.7) | 62.7 (17.1) | 73.3 (22.9) | 79.6 (26.4) | 86.7 (30.4) | 85.8 (29.9) | 80.6 (27.0) | 68.5 (20.3) | 51.7 (10.9) | 38.8 (3.8) | 87.4 (30.8) |
| Mean daily maximum °F (°C) | 24.2 (−4.3) | 27.1 (−2.7) | 36.0 (2.2) | 47.1 (8.4) | 58.6 (14.8) | 66.9 (19.4) | 77.5 (25.3) | 76.5 (24.7) | 66.8 (19.3) | 50.9 (10.5) | 36.3 (2.4) | 23.7 (−4.6) | 49.3 (9.6) |
| Daily mean °F (°C) | 14.0 (−10.0) | 16.2 (−8.8) | 24.8 (−4.0) | 35.8 (2.1) | 45.3 (7.4) | 52.7 (11.5) | 60.1 (15.6) | 58.8 (14.9) | 50.6 (10.3) | 38.1 (3.4) | 25.5 (−3.6) | 14.4 (−9.8) | 36.4 (2.4) |
| Mean daily minimum °F (°C) | 3.9 (−15.6) | 5.3 (−14.8) | 13.7 (−10.2) | 24.5 (−4.2) | 32.1 (0.1) | 38.4 (3.6) | 42.7 (5.9) | 41.2 (5.1) | 34.5 (1.4) | 25.2 (−3.8) | 14.7 (−9.6) | 5.2 (−14.9) | 23.5 (−4.7) |
| Mean minimum °F (°C) | −23.6 (−30.9) | −22.1 (−30.1) | −8.5 (−22.5) | 8.8 (−12.9) | 19.0 (−7.2) | 26.2 (−3.2) | 34.3 (1.3) | 30.3 (−0.9) | 20.7 (−6.3) | 6.2 (−14.3) | −8.0 (−22.2) | −20.4 (−29.1) | −29.4 (−34.1) |
| Record low °F (°C) | −49 (−45) | −41 (−41) | −28 (−33) | −13 (−25) | 5 (−15) | 18 (−8) | 19 (−7) | 20 (−7) | 4 (−16) | −16 (−27) | −31 (−35) | −45 (−43) | −49 (−45) |
| Average precipitation inches (mm) | 1.33 (34) | 1.10 (28) | 1.37 (35) | 2.12 (54) | 2.66 (68) | 2.53 (64) | 1.21 (31) | 1.16 (29) | 1.53 (39) | 2.05 (52) | 1.61 (41) | 1.22 (31) | 19.89 (506) |
Source 1: NOAA
Source 2: XMACIS2

== Demographics ==
Historical population
| Census | Pop. | Note | %± |
|---|---|---|---|
| 2020 | 15 | | — |
U.S. Decennial Census
