= Tendoy Mountains =

Mountain range in Montana, United States

- Location within Montana

Highest point
- Peak: Dixon Mountain
- Elevation: 9,674 ft (2,949 m)
- Coordinates: 44°44′37″N 112°48′26″W

Geography
- Country: United States
- State: Montana

The Tendoy Mountains are a small mountain range northwest of Lima in Beaverhead County in the U.S. state of Montana. The mountains are a subrange of the Beaverhead Mountains, part of the Bitterroot Range. The highest point in the range is Dixon Mountain at 9,674 feet (2,949 m). The Bureau of Land Management (BLM) and US Forest Service manage the range, and most of these remote mountains are roadless, with the largest contiguous area about 68,000 acres in size.

The northern part of the range features rugged Bell and Limekiln Canyons, which contain 700' high cliff faces, ledges, talus, caves and rock walls. A free-standing rock wall, Wedding Ring Rock, is of special geological interest. Indian pictographs are found in some caves. Excellent mule deer habitat is provided by the range's typical habitats of grassland, sagebrush, and ridges forested with lodgepole pine and Douglas-fir.

The arid southern portion of the range lacks any year-round streams except Hidden Pasture Creek. This part of the Tendoys is characterized by patches of Douglas-fir and mountain mahogany growing in open sagebrush grassland. Pronghorn and deer utilize the area year-round, while elk reside here in winter and spring.

== See also ==
- List of mountain ranges in Montana
