= Jackson, Montana =

Unincorporated community in Beaverhead County, Montana, United States

- Census-Designated Place
- Interactive map of Jackson, Montana
- Coordinates: 45°22′16″N 113°24′39″W
- Country: United States
- State: Montana
- County: Beaverhead

Area
  - Total: 0.96 sq mi (2.49 km^{2})
  - Land: 0.96 sq mi (2.49 km^{2})
  - Water: 0 sq mi (0.00 km^{2})
- Elevation: 6,470 ft (1,970 m)

Population (2020)
  - Total: 36
  - Density: 37.4/sq mi (14.44/km^{2})
- FIPS code: 30-39025
- GNIS feature ID: 2804261

Jackson is an unincorporated community in Beaverhead County, Montana, United States. Jackson has a post office with a ZIP code 59736. As of the 2020 census, Jackson had a population of 36.

== History ==
The post office opened on August 1, 1896. The town is named after the first postmaster, Anton H. Jackson.

== Geography ==
Jackson lies on Montana Secondary Highway 278, south of Wisdom and northwest of Dillon. Hot springs are just east of the town. Warm Springs Creek flows nearby. Tweedy Mountain is to the east and Bannack State Park is to the south.

=== Climate ===
The climate type of Jackson is a subarctic climate (Köppen: Dfc), because of the influence of altitude, the average temperature of only 3 months per year exceeds 50 °F (10 °C).

Climate data for Jackson, Montana, 1991–2020 normals, extremes 1954–2013: 6480ft (1975m)
Month	Jan	Feb	Mar	Apr	May	Jun	Jul	Aug	Sep	Oct	Nov	Dec	Year
Record high °F (°C)	54 (12)	56 (13)	65 (18)	75 (24)	86 (30)	93 (34)	92 (33)	93 (34)	88 (31)	79 (26)	66 (19)	55 (13)	93 (34)
Mean maximum °F (°C)	45.0 (7.2)	46.0 (7.8)	54.2 (12.3)	65.5 (18.6)	73.6 (23.1)	81.7 (27.6)	86.5 (30.3)	85.6 (29.8)	80.7 (27.1)	69.9 (21.1)	55.4 (13.0)	43.9 (6.6)	88.1 (31.2)
Mean daily maximum °F (°C)	28.4 (−2.0)	31.0 (−0.6)	38.7 (3.7)	46.4 (8.0)	57.1 (13.9)	66.0 (18.9)	76.7 (24.8)	75.7 (24.3)	65.5 (18.6)	50.7 (10.4)	35.9 (2.2)	27.0 (−2.8)	49.9 (9.9)
Daily mean °F (°C)	18.4 (−7.6)	19.7 (−6.8)	23.4 (−4.8)	34.5 (1.4)	44.0 (6.7)	51.5 (10.8)	59.2 (15.1)	57.3 (14.1)	48.9 (9.4)	37.8 (3.2)	25.2 (−3.8)	17.2 (−8.2)	36.8 (2.7)
Mean daily minimum °F (°C)	8.4 (−13.1)	8.3 (−13.2)	16.1 (−8.8)	22.6 (−5.2)	30.9 (−0.6)	37.0 (2.8)	41.7 (5.4)	39.0 (3.9)	32.4 (0.2)	24.9 (−3.9)	14.5 (−9.7)	7.5 (−13.6)	23.6 (−4.7)
Mean minimum °F (°C)	−18.9 (−28.3)	−16.6 (−27.0)	−4.5 (−20.3)	6.0 (−14.4)	16.8 (−8.4)	26.3 (−3.2)	30.3 (−0.9)	28.8 (−1.8)	19.3 (−7.1)	6.6 (−14.1)	−7.1 (−21.7)	−15.6 (−26.4)	−28.0 (−33.3)
Record low °F (°C)	−40 (−40)	−41 (−41)	−26 (−32)	−12 (−24)	5 (−15)	17 (−8)	20 (−7)	15 (−9)	2 (−17)	−13 (−25)	−31 (−35)	−39 (−39)	−41 (−41)
Average precipitation inches (mm)	0.59 (15)	0.53 (13)	0.83 (21)	1.05 (27)	1.50 (38)	1.94 (49)	0.91 (23)	0.90 (23)	1.10 (28)	0.94 (24)	1.01 (26)	0.65 (17)	11.95 (304)
Average precipitation days (≥ 0.01 in)	6.6	5.7	7.5	9.9	9.0	10.1	5.4	5.1	3.9	5.7	6.6	7.5	83.0
Source 1: XMACIS2 (mean maxima/minima 1981–2010)
Source 2: NOAA

== Demographics ==
Historical population
Census	Pop.	Note	%±
2020	36		—
U.S. Decennial Census

== Education ==
Jackson provides elementary education. High school is at Beaverhead County High School.
