= Polaris, Montana =

Settlement in Montana, United States

Coordinates: 45°22′11″N 113°07′10″W

Polaris is an unincorporated community in Beaverhead County, Montana, United States. Polaris has a post office with a ZIP code 59746. Polaris lies in the Grasshopper Valley, along the Pioneer Mountain Scenic Byway, southeast of Wisdom. This community takes its name from the Polaris Mine, which operated as a silver mine from 1885 until 1922.

Attractions to the Polaris area include Maverick Mountain Ski Area, Montana High Country Tours Lodge, the Grasshopper Inn, Elkhorn Hotsprings, Bannack State Park, and Crystal Park. Polaris is minutes from blue ribbon trout streams, hundreds of snowmobile and cross-country ski trails, and trail heads to mountain lakes.

Hay, horse, and cattle production are among the major industries in Polaris, along with a rise in tourism and recreation. Originally, Polaris was a mining town with a general store, post office, and saloon. Hundreds of miners lived north of Polaris and worked the Elkhorn Mine and Coolidge Mine, among other smaller mines. Mail delivered to the Grasshopper Valley was processed at the Polaris post office and still is today.

== Climate ==
According to the Köppen Climate Classification system, Polaris has a semi-arid climate, abbreviated "BSk" on climate maps. The average snowfall is 49 inches (120 cm).

== Education ==
Polaris provides elementary education. High school is at Beaverhead County High School.
