= Pioneer Mountains (Montana) =

Mountain range in Montana, United States

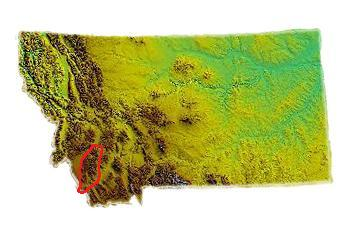

Highest point
- Peak: Tweedy Mountain
- Elevation: 11,154 ft (3,400 m)

Geography
- Country: United States
- State: Montana
- Range coordinates: 45°37′N 112°55′W
- Parent range: Beaverhead Mountains

The Pioneer Mountains cover 2,000 square miles (5,200 km^{2}) in Beaverhead County in southwestern Montana, USA.

The highest peaks in this range include:

- Tweedy Mountain (11,154 ft or 3,400 m)
- Torrey Mountain (11,147 ft or 3,398 m)
- Baldy Mountain (10,568 ft or 3,221 m)
- Mount Fleecer (9,436 ft or 2,876 m)
- Odell Mountain (9,405 ft or 2,867 m)

The Pioneer Mountains are divided into two subranges by the paved Wise River Road: the East Pioneers and West Pioneers. The highest mountains in the entire range are in the East Pioneers - Tweedy Mountain and nearby Torrey Mountain, these two peaks are the highest on the Beaverhead National Forest.

The two subranges are quite different from each other in appearance. The East Pioneers have rugged, heavily glaciated peaks. About 145,000 acres (59,000 ha) of the East Pioneers are roadless, and the range holds more than 30 high lakes, including Grayling Lake, which contains Arctic grayling. Golden trout are present in Sawtooth and Hidden Lakes. Mountain goats inhabit the high crags of the range, while pronghorn utilize the lower elevation grassland foothills. The East Pioneers receive relatively little use from recreationists, and a number of lake basins are trailless.

In marked contrast to the East Pioneers, the West Pioneers are gently rolling, heavily forested mountains. The highest point in the West Pioneers is Stine Mountain, el. 9,497 ft. 148,000 acres (60,000 ha) of the West Pioneers are a Wilderness Study Area. All told, about 239,000 acres (97,000 ha) of the West Pioneers were roadless as of 1992, including the Wilderness Study Area.

Lakes in the West Pioneers contain perhaps the last pure strain population of Arctic grayling south of Canada. Old growth whitebark pine and lodgepole pine is present in the West Pioneers; a stand of lodgepole pine over 500 years old is reputed to be the oldest known anywhere.

Wolke describes the West Pioneers region as an ecological treasure. Wildlife in the West Pioneers includes elk, black bear, moose, pine marten, wolverine, and northern goshawk.

A site on the Beaverhead National Forest just off the Wise River Road, called Crystal Park, is available for the public to dig for quartz crystals.

== Climate ==
Climate data for Tweedy Mountain 45.4826 N, 112.9686 W, Elevation: 10,189 ft (3,106 m) (1991–2020 normals)
Month	Jan	Feb	Mar	Apr	May	Jun	Jul	Aug	Sep	Oct	Nov	Dec	Year
Mean daily maximum °F (°C)	21.9 (−5.6)	21.8 (−5.7)	27.1 (−2.7)	32.7 (0.4)	42.0 (5.6)	51.2 (10.7)	62.9 (17.2)	62.4 (16.9)	52.8 (11.6)	39.0 (3.9)	26.6 (−3.0)	20.7 (−6.3)	38.4 (3.6)
Daily mean °F (°C)	14.2 (−9.9)	13.1 (−10.5)	17.3 (−8.2)	22.0 (−5.6)	30.8 (−0.7)	39.1 (3.9)	49.2 (9.6)	48.7 (9.3)	40.4 (4.7)	28.8 (−1.8)	18.9 (−7.3)	13.3 (−10.4)	28.0 (−2.2)
Mean daily minimum °F (°C)	6.6 (−14.1)	4.3 (−15.4)	7.4 (−13.7)	11.3 (−11.5)	19.5 (−6.9)	27.0 (−2.8)	35.5 (1.9)	35.1 (1.7)	28.0 (−2.2)	18.5 (−7.5)	11.2 (−11.6)	5.9 (−14.5)	17.5 (−8.0)
Average precipitation inches (mm)	3.25 (83)	3.30 (84)	4.32 (110)	5.45 (138)	5.45 (138)	5.02 (128)	2.09 (53)	1.94 (49)	2.67 (68)	3.19 (81)	3.79 (96)	3.76 (96)	44.23 (1,124)
Source: PRISM Climate Group

== See also ==
- List of mountain ranges in Montana
