= Big Hole National Battlefield =

Historical battlefield in Montana, United States

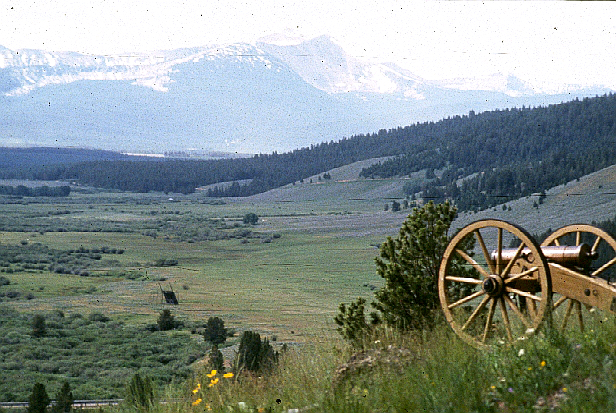

- Location within the United States Location within Montana
- Location: Beaverhead County, Montana, U.S.
- Nearest city: Dillon
- Coordinates: 45°38′15″N 113°38′37″W
- Area: 655.61 acres (265.32 ha)
- Established: 1883 (Military Preserve); June 23, 1910 (NPS)
- Visitors: 54,781 (in 2022)
- Governing body: National Park Service
- Website: Big Hole National Battlefield

Big Hole National Battlefield preserves a battlefield in the western United States, located in Beaverhead County, Montana. In 1877, the Nez Perce fought a delaying action against the U.S. Army's 7th Infantry Regiment here on August 9 and 10, during their failed attempt to escape to Canada. This action, the Battle of the Big Hole, was the largest battle fought between the Nez Perce and U.S. government forces in the five-month conflict known as the Nez Perce War.

In 1992, the park was made a part of Nez Perce National Historical Park, which consists of 38 locations in five states, following the flight of the Nez Perce tribe from the U.S. military, the route of which was designated Nez Perce National Historic Trail in 1986.

Just east of the continental divide at Chief Joseph Pass, Big Hole National Battlefield is located on 975.61 acres (3.9 km^{2}) (including 320 acres/1.3 km^{2} privately held), ten miles (16 km) west of Wisdom on Montana Highway 43. A year-round visitor center is located in the park.

== History ==
The Nez Perce homeland territory was in the states now known as Oregon, Washington, and Idaho. In 1873, Chief Joseph negotiated with the federal government to ensure his people could stay on their land in the Wallowa Valley as stipulated in 1855 and 1863 land treaties with the U.S. government. By 1860 more than 15,000 miners had broken the treaty terms, and the government did nothing to intervene. In 1877, President Grant signed an Executive order granting the Wallowa to the Nez Perce, only to rescind it two years later. As a result, more people overran the land. Two farmers killed a warrior wrongly accused of stealing a horse. Warriors then engaged with settlers, until Joseph, who was 36 years of age, decided it best to not continue to engage, as he was a peace-loving person. Fearing U.S. Army retaliation, Chief Joseph decided that the best way to avoid the official U.S. Government policy of forcing Native Americans onto reservations was to escape to Canada, where he believed that his people would be treated differently and they could unite with Sitting Bull, leader of a band of Lakota there.

At White Bird Canyon, Brigadier General Oliver Howard, who outnumbered the Nez Perce two to one, was defeated on June 17, after firing on the Nez Perce who came to parley under a white flag. Thirty-four soldiers were killed, but only two Nez Perce warriors were. The Nez Perce who were now part of the group moving to Canada, numbered around 750, with only 200 warriors. Six weeks after leaving their homeland, U.S. Army forces performed a predawn attack on the men, women, and children encamped at Big Hole. The Nez Perce mounted a fierce resistance and managed to overwhelm the attacking force, cornering them on a hillside. Meanwhile, the women and children fled the battlefield after burying their dead. During the day and a half battle, the Nez Perce lost an estimated 60 to 90 men, women and children, although it is believed that actual losses may have been much higher with a good portion being women and children. U.S. forces lost 29 and an additional 40 serious casualties. The confrontation was the most violent battle between the Nez Perce and the U.S. Government forces. After the battle the Nez Perce fled east through Yellowstone National Park, then headed north. In October 1877, only 40 miles (64 km) from the Canada–US border in Montana's Bear Paw Mountains, the starving and exhausted Nez Percé surrendered to the U.S. Forces commanded by General Oliver O. Howard, only after Howard and Miles said they would be allowed to return to their beloved Wallowas. It was a lie. Approximately 200-250 Nez Perce warriors escaped to Canada prior to the surrender, leaving 417 women, children and elderly. Upon the final surrender by Chief Joseph he was quoted as saying, "Hear me, my chiefs! I am tired. My heart is sick and sad. From where the sun now stands I will fight no more forever". The actual speech was much longer. The Nez Perce were removed to the Colville Reservation in Washington state, and Chief Joseph was never allowed to return to his Wallowas until 1900, when he was "allowed" to see his father's grave. The Nez Perce farmed before the settlers arrived.

== Administrative history ==
The site was established as a Military Preserve in 1883, and designated a National Monument on June 23, 1910. It was redesignated a National Battlefield on May 17, 1963. The trail system was designated as a National Recreation Trail in 1977. As with all historic areas administered by the National Park Service, the battlefield was listed on the National Register of Historic Places on October 15, 1966.

== Sources ==
- The National Parks: Index 2001–2003. Washington: U.S. Department of the Interior.
- Theodore Catton; Ann Hubber (1999). "Commemoration and Preservation: An Administrative History of Big Hole National Battlefield". National Park Service. Archived from the original on December 2, 2012.
- Aubrey Haines (1968). "Historical Research Management Plan for Big Hole National Battlefield and Bibliography of Nez Perce War, 1877" (PDF). National Park Service. Archived from the original (PDF) on November 14, 2012.
- Douglas D. Scott (1994). "A Sharp Little Affair-Archeology of the Big Hole Battlefield" (PDF). Reprints in Archeology. Archived from the original (PDF) on November 13, 2012.
