= 2024 Idaho wildfires =

Natural disasters in the USA

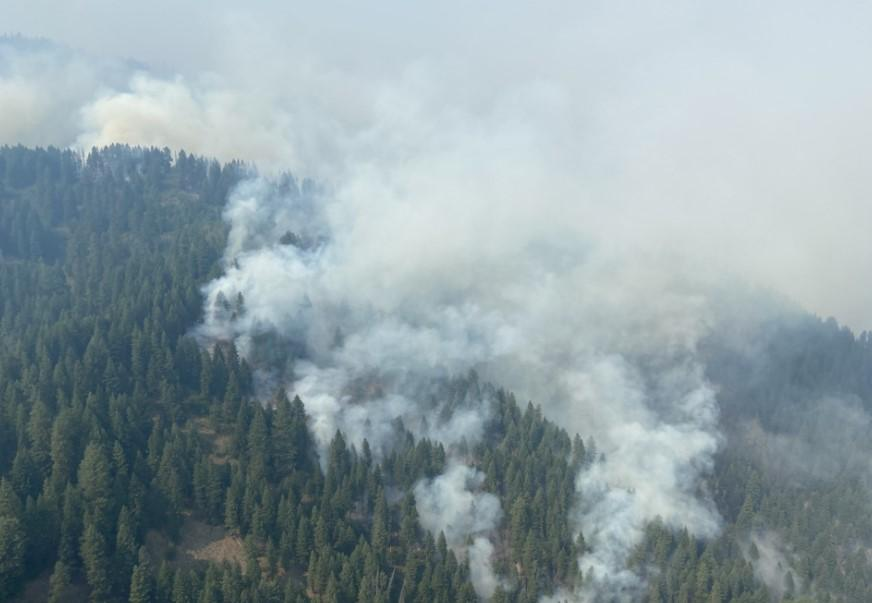
- View of smoke from the Nellie Fire on August 13, 2024.

The 2024 Idaho wildfire season was a series of notable wildfires that burned throughout the U.S. state of Idaho during 2024.

Predictions made by the National Interagency Fire Center at the start of the season forecast an above-average potential for most of Idaho. This fire potential was partially due to the two previous winters being wet, leading to a large amount of extra brush and plants to grow.

== Background ==
While the "fire season" in Idaho varies every year based on fire weather conditions, most wildfires occur from June to September. Fire activities normally increase in July and August because of drier conditions, hotter temperatures, and more lightning strikes from thunderstorms. However, wildfire severity can vary every year based on preseason conditions such as snowpack and the overcrowded growth of vegetation and dying trees.

== Summary ==
By early October, Idaho experienced a notably intense wildfire season. The state saw nearly 826,000 acres burned by October 1, marking the highest total since 2012, primarily across the Boise and Payette National Forests where several fires burned explosively in September.

One of the most destructive was the Paddock Fire, sparked by lightning and ultimately scorching approximately 187,000 acres across Gem, Payette, and Washington counties—qualifying it as one of Idaho's largest fires in the season. Meanwhile, the Wapiti Fire, which began in late summer, devastated over 129,000 acres across Boise and Custer counties, becoming another major centerpiece of the season.

Despite the immense acreage burned, Idaho saw relatively limited structural loss—a rarity in extreme fire years—though more than 50 homes were lost, including eight in the Wapiti Fire and four in the Gwen Fire near Kendrick. The season's fuel dynamics and high demand across fires created intense pressure on suppression resources.

Financially, the Idaho Department of Lands (IDL) logged a massive expenditure—over $39 million on firefighting operations through the season—with a significant portion spent combating the Gwen and Texas fires. By late August, IDL estimated total fire suppression costs at $51.1 million, and net General Fund obligations after reimbursables amounted to approximately $45.8 million

== List of wildfires ==
The following is a list of fires that burned more than 1,000 acres (400 ha), or produced significant structural damage or casualties.

Name	County	Acres	Start date	Containment date (Note: Containment means that fire crews have established and secured control lines around the fire's perimeter. These lines are artificial barriers, like trenches or cleared vegetation, designed to stop the fire's spread, or natural barriers like rivers. Containment reflects progress in managing the fire but does not necessarily mean the fire is starved of fuel, under control, or put out.)	Notes	Ref
OTR 31	Ada	2,595	June 11	June 11	Caused by human activity.	
OTR 47	Ada	2,127	June 15	June 15	Caused by human activity.	
Coonskin	Twin Falls, Owyhee	13,074	June 26	July 22	Caused by lightning.	
Soldier	Owyhee	5,313	June 26	June 30	Lightning-caused.	
Billy Creek	Nez Perce	3,185	July 3	August 7	Started along the Idaho/Washington state line.	
Swany	Ada	1,154	July 6	July 9		
MM97 I-84	Elmore	6,336	July 8	July 12		
Bench Lake	Custer	2,595	July 11	August 22	Caused by human activity.	
OTR 136	Ada	1,106	July 12	July 12	Caused by human activity.	
Mary	Owyhee	6,231	July 13	July 15	Lightning-caused.	
Texas	Latah	1,565	July 15	August	Caused by human activity.	
Gwen	Latah	28,820	July 24	August 8	Caused by lightning. Firefighting efforts were complicated by dry, dead grass as fuel and steep slopes. 38 homes and 122 outbuildings were destroyed.	
Limepoint	Adams & Latah	33,084	July 24	September 22	8 miles north of Oxbow Dam. Merged with Oxbow Fire.	
Thunder	Lemhi	2,474	July 24	August 8	Lightning-caused.	
Sugar	Owyhee	13,727	July 24	July 26	Lightning-caused.	
Twentymile	Elmore	4,142	July 24	July 25	Lightning-caused.	
Wapiti	Boise & Custer	129,063	July 24	October 31	Caused by lightning.	
Dove	Elmore, Owyhee	3,260	July 24	July 28	Lightning-caused.	
Wolf Creek	Adams & Valley	1,154	July 24	September 4		
Wye	Idaho	13,137	July 25	November 4	Caused by lightning. Was unstaffed due to higher priority fires.	
Ace Butte	Idaho	1,962	July 25	October 23	Lightning-caused.	
Anchor	Idaho	1,890	July 28	October 23	Lightning-caused.	
Cliff Mountain	Adams & Idaho	1,108	July 25	August 20		
Jump	Owyhee	25,741	August 5	August 7	Lightning-caused.	
Bulldog	Boise & Valley	11,423	August 5	October 28	Lightning-caused.	
Dollar	Valley	4,360	August 5	October 17	Lightning-caused.	
Flat	Boise	3,734	August 5	September 2	Lightning-caused.	
Goat	Valley	36,718	August 5	October 28	Lightning-caused.	
Nellie	Boise & Valley	50,073	August 5	October 28	Lightning-caused. Merged with Anderson Fire on August 12.	
Paddock	Gem, Payette, & Washington	187,185	August 5	August 18	Lightning-caused.	
Snag	Valley	33,437	August 5	October 28	Lightning-caused.	
Farrow	Idaho	3,637	August 5	October 24	Lightning-caused.	
Basin	Elmore	6,094	August 5	August 7	Lightning-caused.	
Elkhorn Ridge	Idaho	3,140	August 7	October 31		
Parks	Idaho	5,997	August 11	October 31	Lightning-caused.	
Prospect	Idaho	2,937	August 12	October 31		
Birch	Valley	23,094	August 17	October 29	Lightning-caused.	
Magic Water	Twin Falls	2,368	August 17	August 18	Caused by human activity.	
Square Lake	Idaho	5,240	August 17	October 24	Lightning-caused.	
Burnt Creek	Valley	2,665	August 19	October 11	Lightning-caused.	
Reynolds	Lemhi	2,671	August 22	October 31	Lightning-caused.	
Magruder Ridge	Idaho	3,778	August 22	October 31		
Halfway	Idaho	1,502	August 25	November 4	Lightning-caused.	
Lava	Gem	97,585	September 2	October 25	Caused by lightning, merged with the Boulder Fire	
Syrup	Elmore	5,129	September 2	September 3	Lightning-caused.	
Mineral	Washington	15,392	September 2	September 8	Lightning-caused.	
Chimney	Elmore, Camas	6,522	September 2	October 29	Lightning-caused.	
Bigflat	Washington	3,662	September 2	September 4	Lightning-caused.	
Glendale	Blaine	7,546	September 2	September 5	Lightning-caused.	
Copper	Valley	2,129	September 2	October 24	Lightning-caused.	
Red Rock	Lemhi	79,260	September 2	October 29	Lightning-caused. Merged with the Black Eagle Fire on October 5.	
Berry	Elmore, Gooding	14,412	September 2	September 6	Lightning-caused.	
Commissary	Bonneville	6,885	September 4	November 7	Lightning-caused.	
South Selway Complex	Idaho	1,928	September 6	October 24	Lightning-caused. Consisted of the Lonesome, Goat Creek, Doe, and Twin Butte 2 fires.	
Frog	Custer	3,020	September 7	October 9	Lightning-caused.	
Table	Owyhee	17,497	September 8	September 10	Lightning-caused.	
Logan	Valley	15,672	September 9	November 12		
Garden	Lemhi	13,036	September 11	October 26	Lightning-caused.	
Nugget	Idaho	1,001	September 13	October 30	Lightning-caused.	
Rosie	Owyhee	5,628	September 30	October 17	Caused by human activity.	
Valley	Ada	9,904	October 4	October 23		
Martin	Blaine	1,100	October 4	October 5		

Perimeters of 2024 Idaho wildfires (map data)

== See also ==
- 2024 United States wildfires
