= Albino Lake =

Lake in Gallatin County, Montana

- Golden Fontinalis Lake
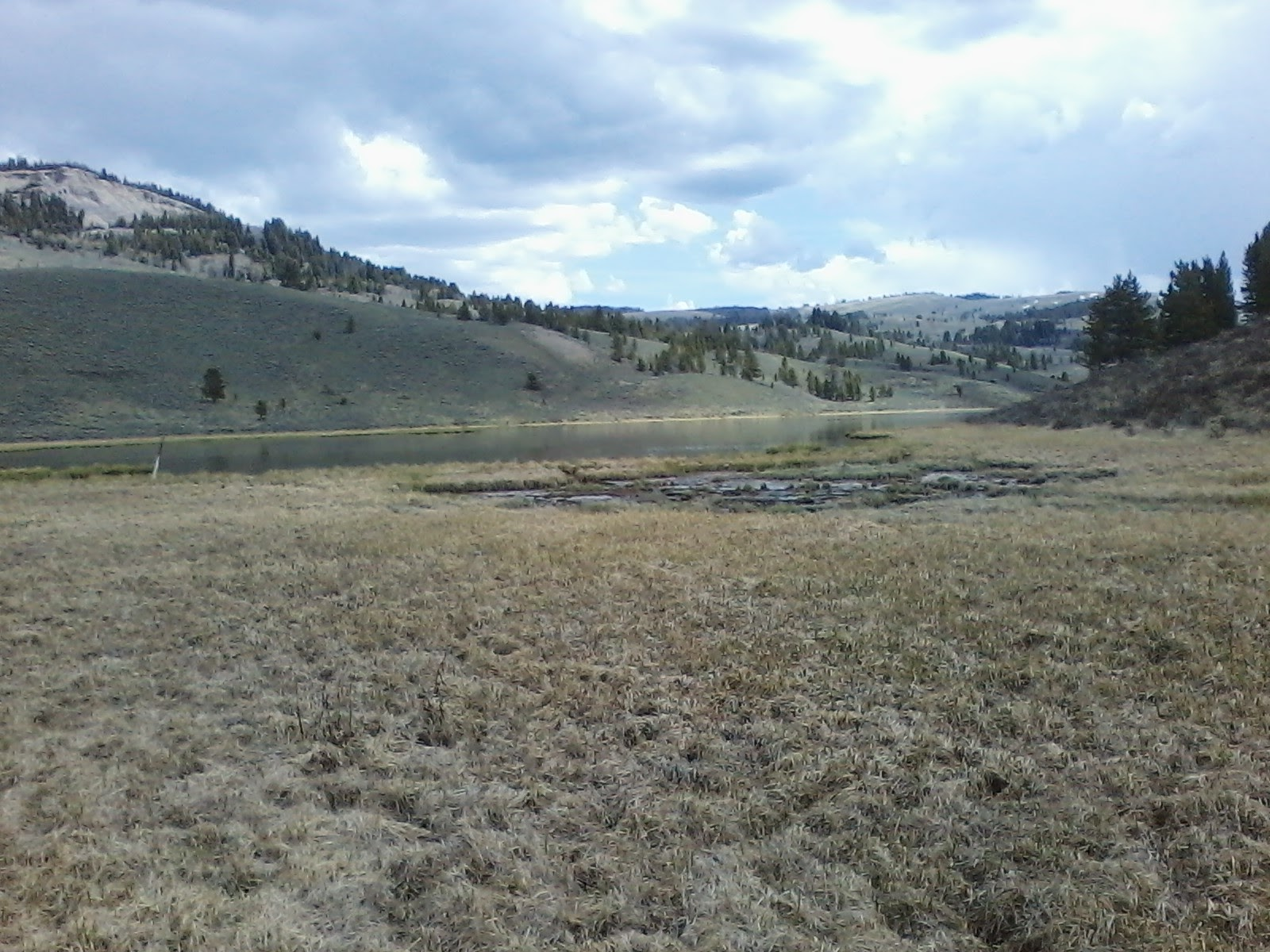

- Location within Montana Location within the United States
- Location: Gallatin County, Montana
- Coordinates: 45°05′17″N 111°17′27″W
- Type: Lake
- Primary inflows: Madison Range
- Primary outflows: Meadow Creek
- Basin countries: United States
- Surface area: 22 acres (8.9 ha)
- Surface elevation: 7,106 ft (2,166 m)

Albino Lake is a lake in Gallatin County, Montana in the Madison Range in south central Montana. It is located on Meadow Creek, a tributary of the Taylor Fork in the Gallatin National Forest and sits at an elevation of 7,106 ft (2,166 m).

The lake has historically been stocked by the United States Forest Service with rainbow trout and Yellowstone cutthroat trout. Montana Fish, Wildlife, and Parks reports that the population of rainbow trout, last stocked in the 1950s, has died out, but the cutthroats remain.
