= Lima, Montana =

- Town
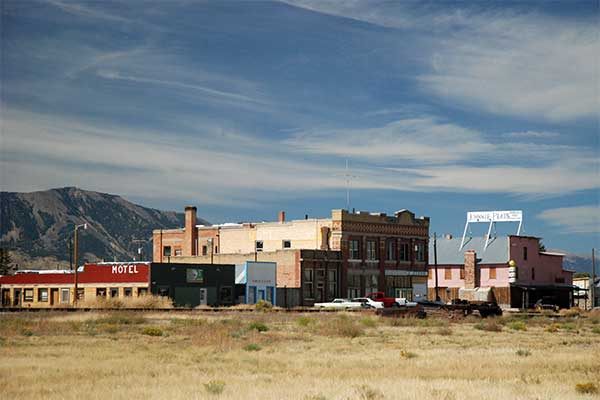
- The historic business district of Lima, Montana, September 2007

- Seal

- Location of Lima, Montana
- Coordinates: 44°38′18″N 112°35′31″W
- Country: United States
- State: Montana
- County: Beaverhead

Area
  - Total: 0.55 sq mi (1.42 km^{2})
  - Land: 0.55 sq mi (1.42 km^{2})
  - Water: 0 sq mi (0.00 km^{2})
- Elevation: 6,250 ft (1,900 m)

Population (2020)
  - Total: 212
  - Density: 386.6/sq mi (149.28/km^{2})
- Time zone: UTC-7 (Mountain (MST))
  - Summer (DST): UTC-6 (MDT)
- ZIP code: 59739
- Area code: 406
- FIPS code: 30-43525
- GNIS feature ID: 2412896
- Website: limamt.com

Lima (/ˈlaɪmə/, LY-mə) is a town in Beaverhead County, Montana, United States. As of the 2020 census, the population was 212.

== Description ==
The community was named after Lima, Ohio, the native home of an early settler. The post office was established in 1881 under postmaster L. Eugene Simmons. The town, originally named Allerdice, became Spring Hill and finally Lima in 1889.

== Geography ==
Lima is exit 15 on Interstate 15. Red Rock River runs near the town.

According to the United States Census Bureau, the town has a total area of 0.53 square miles (1.37 km^{2}), all land.

Sheep Creek Wickiup Cave, an important archaeological site, is located nearby in the Tendoy Mountains in Big Sheep Creek Canyon. The wickiup has a 17 foot diameter and interior height of 10 feet. The structure was used by the Tukudeka.

=== Climate ===
According to the Köppen Climate Classification system, Lima has a cold semi-arid climate, abbreviated "BSk" on climate maps.

Climate data for Lima, Montana (1991–2020 normals, extremes 1898–1902, 1913–1923, 1931–present)
Month	Jan	Feb	Mar	Apr	May	Jun	Jul	Aug	Sep	Oct	Nov	Dec	Year
Record high °F (°C)	60 (16)	57 (14)	69 (21)	79 (26)	90 (32)	95 (35)	100 (38)	99 (37)	93 (34)	83 (28)	71 (22)	66 (19)	100 (38)
Mean maximum °F (°C)	42.1 (5.6)	46.2 (7.9)	56.9 (13.8)	68.1 (20.1)	75.9 (24.4)	83.5 (28.6)	89.9 (32.2)	88.6 (31.4)	84.0 (28.9)	72.9 (22.7)	57.4 (14.1)	44.4 (6.9)	91.1 (32.8)
Mean daily maximum °F (°C)	30.2 (−1.0)	33.7 (0.9)	43.7 (6.5)	52.7 (11.5)	62.2 (16.8)	71.6 (22.0)	82.6 (28.1)	81.3 (27.4)	71.3 (21.8)	56.4 (13.6)	40.9 (4.9)	29.7 (−1.3)	54.7 (12.6)
Daily mean °F (°C)	20.6 (−6.3)	22.8 (−5.1)	32.2 (0.1)	39.9 (4.4)	48.7 (9.3)	56.7 (13.7)	64.9 (18.3)	63.5 (17.5)	55.0 (12.8)	42.8 (6.0)	30.1 (−1.1)	20.5 (−6.4)	41.5 (5.3)
Mean daily minimum °F (°C)	11.0 (−11.7)	11.9 (−11.2)	20.7 (−6.3)	27.0 (−2.8)	35.3 (1.8)	41.8 (5.4)	47.3 (8.5)	45.7 (7.6)	38.7 (3.7)	29.2 (−1.6)	19.2 (−7.1)	11.3 (−11.5)	28.3 (−2.1)
Mean minimum °F (°C)	−13.9 (−25.5)	−12.3 (−24.6)	−0.3 (−17.9)	10.6 (−11.9)	20.7 (−6.3)	27.4 (−2.6)	35.3 (1.8)	33.3 (0.7)	22.6 (−5.2)	8.4 (−13.1)	−5.3 (−20.7)	−11.6 (−24.2)	−21.1 (−29.5)
Record low °F (°C)	−44 (−42)	−43 (−42)	−29 (−34)	−7 (−22)	7 (−14)	17 (−8)	24 (−4)	23 (−5)	6 (−14)	−16 (−27)	−35 (−37)	−44 (−42)	−44 (−42)
Average precipitation inches (mm)	0.24 (6.1)	0.25 (6.4)	0.40 (10)	0.93 (24)	1.66 (42)	1.99 (51)	1.27 (32)	1.02 (26)	0.92 (23)	0.98 (25)	0.41 (10)	0.28 (7.1)	10.35 (263)
Average snowfall inches (cm)	6.0 (15)	5.1 (13)	6.8 (17)	10.1 (26)	4.7 (12)	1.1 (2.8)	0.0 (0.0)	0.0 (0.0)	0.6 (1.5)	6.7 (17)	5.8 (15)	5.7 (14)	52.6 (134)
Average precipitation days (≥ 0.01 in)	4.3	4.0	4.8	6.8	8.6	9.2	6.5	5.7	4.8	5.0	3.3	4.3	67.3
Average snowy days (≥ 0.1 in)	3.9	3.2	4.1	3.9	1.5	0.4	0.0	0.0	0.2	2.0	2.8	3.7	25.7
Source: NOAA

== Demographics ==
Historical population
Census	Pop.	Note	%±
1920	476		—
1930	459		−3.6%
1940	554		20.7%
1950	483		−12.8%
1960	397		−17.8%
1970	351		−11.6%
1980	272		−22.5%
1990	265		−2.6%
2000	242		−8.7%
2010	221		−8.7%
2020	212		−4.1%
U.S. Decennial Census

=== 2010 census ===
As of the census of 2010, there were 221 people, 106 households, and 63 families residing in the town. The population density was 417.0 inhabitants per square mile (161.0/km^{2}). There were 173 housing units at an average density of 326.4 per square mile (126.0/km^{2}). The racial makeup of the town was 94.1% White, 0.9% African American, 0.9% Native American, 0.9% Pacific Islander, 0.5% from other races, and 2.7% from two or more races. Hispanic or Latino of any race were 3.6% of the population.

There were 106 households, of which 23.6% had children under the age of 18 living with them, 49.1% were married couples living together, 6.6% had a female householder with no husband present, 3.8% had a male householder with no wife present, and 40.6% were non-families. 38.7% of all households were made up of individuals, and 11.3% had someone living alone who was 65 years of age or older. The average household size was 2.08 and the average family size was 2.75.

The median age in the town was 51.8 years. 23.5% of residents were under the age of 18; 2.8% were between the ages of 18 and 24; 13.7% were from 25 to 44; 34.8% were from 45 to 64; and 25.3% were 65 years of age or older. The gender makeup of the town was 52.9% male and 47.1% female.

=== 2000 census ===
As of the census of 2000, there were 242 people, 109 households, and 64 families residing in the town. The population density was 438.7 inhabitants per square mile (169.4/km^{2}). There were 158 housing units at an average density of 286.4 per square mile (110.6/km^{2}). The racial makeup of the town was 92.98% White, 2.89% Native American, 1.65% from other races, and 2.48% from two or more races. Hispanic or Latino of any race were 1.65% of the population.

There were 109 households, out of which 22.9% had children under the age of 18 living with them, 53.2% were married couples living together, 3.7% had a female householder with no husband present, and 40.4% were non-families. 34.9% of all households were made up of individuals, and 13.8% had someone living alone who was 65 years of age or older. The average household size was 2.22 and the average family size was 2.94.

In the town, the population was spread out, with 25.6% under the age of 18, 2.5% from 18 to 24, 24.8% from 25 to 44, 24.4% from 45 to 64, and 22.7% who were 65 years of age or older. The median age was 44 years. For every 100 females there were 103.4 males. For every 100 females age 18 and over, there were 93.5 males.

The median income for a household in the town was $20,313, and the median income for a family was $28,438. Males had a median income of $22,083 versus $17,500 for females. The per capita income for the town was $13,163. About 20.6% of families and 26.8% of the population were below the poverty line, including 47.4% of those under the age of eighteen and 11.9% of those 65 or over.

== Government ==
In November 2025 incumbent mayor David Olsen was re-elected.

== Education ==
Lima School District educates students from kindergarten through 12th grade. The school mascot is the Bears. Lima High School is a Class C school (less than 108 students) which helps determine athletic competitions.

== Media ==
The radio station KBOQ is licensed in Lima.

== See also ==
- List of municipalities in Montana
