= 2025 Wyoming wildfires =

Natural disasters in the USA

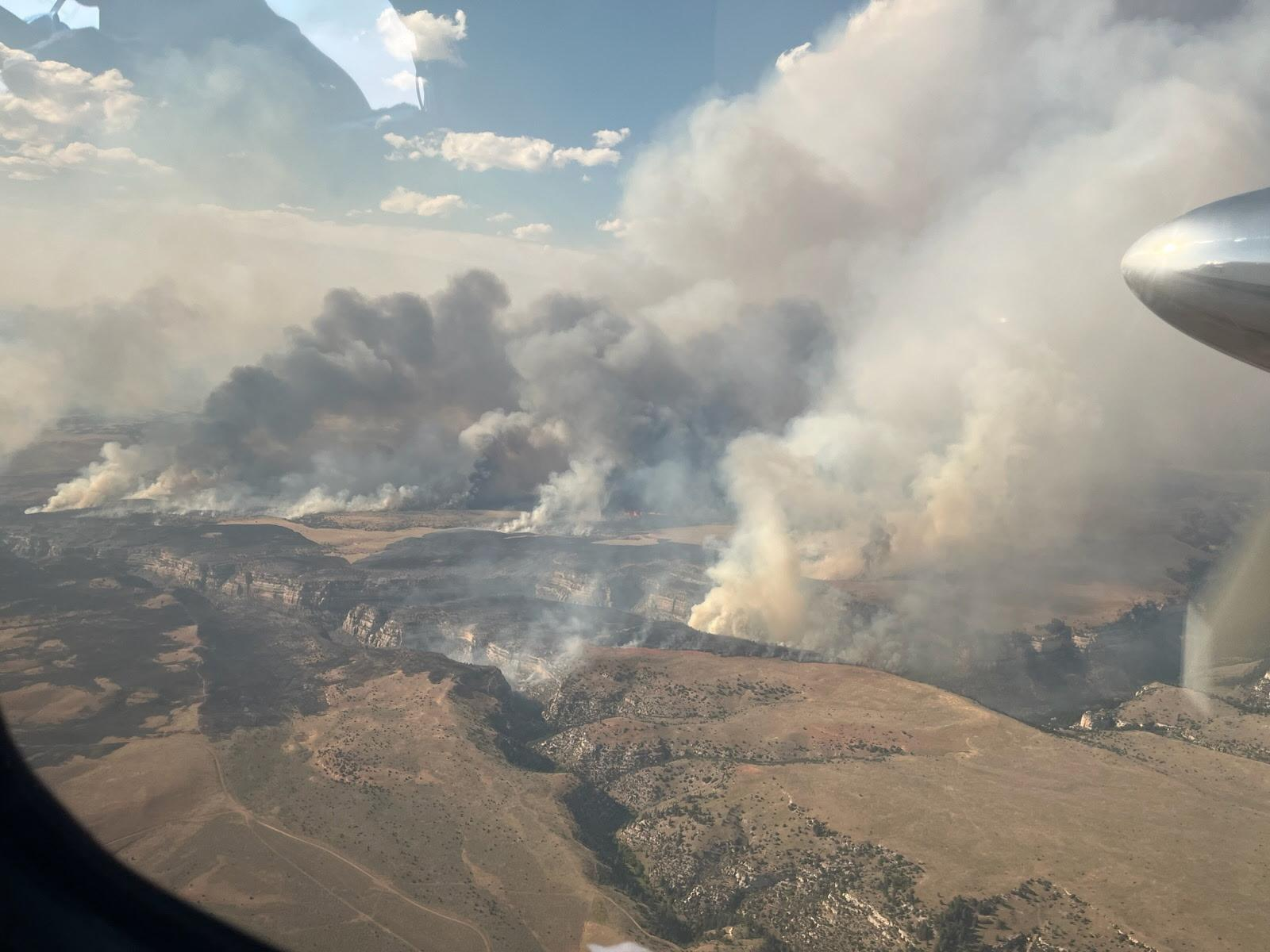
- Aerial view of the Vees Fire on July 27

A series of wildfires burned throughout the U.S. state of Wyoming during 2025.

== Background ==
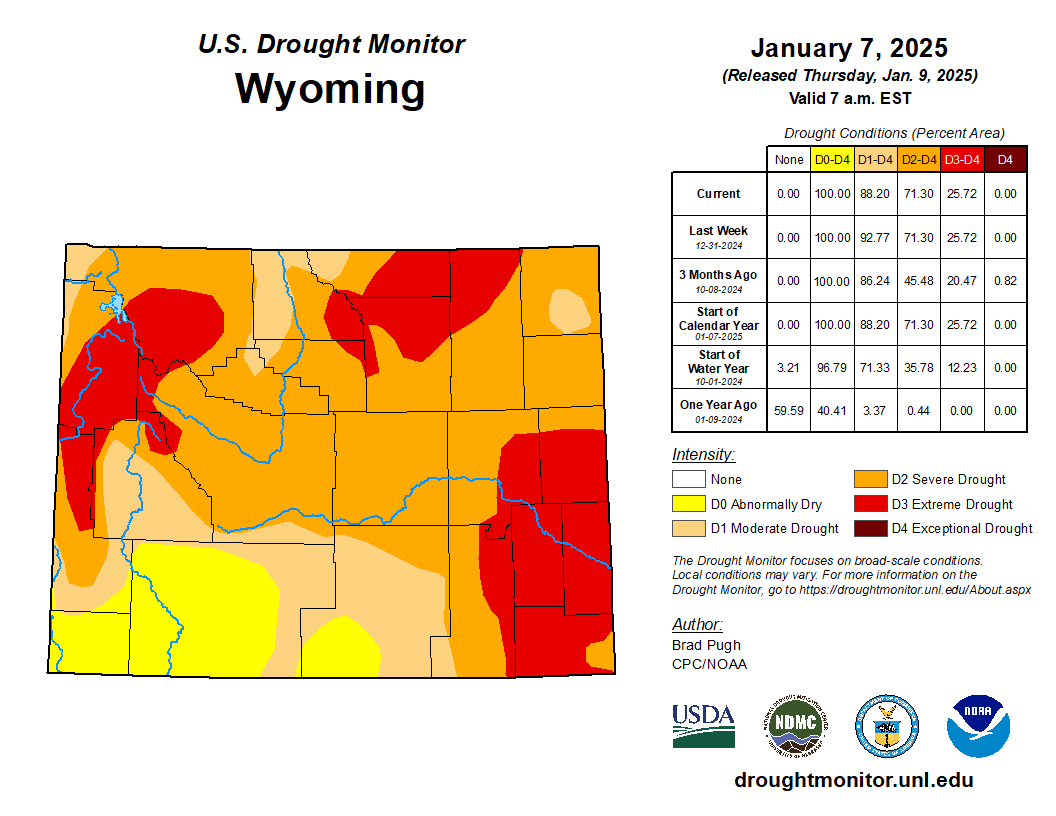
Wyoming Drought Monitor on January 7, 2025

"Wildfire season" in Wyoming typically occurs between June and September, but wildfires can occur as early as April and late as December. Peak time of fire season is normally in July and August. Wildfires in Wyoming are triggered by a dry climate, drought, grasses die and dry out, and times when dry thunderstorms are more common. Humidity levels, dryness of fuel, wind, and temperature also play a crucial role. Forests that have not had wildfires in recent years have more fire fuel, and trees killed by disease and insect infestation quickly dry up and become a prime fuel for wildfires.

== Summary ==
In mid-August, lightning sparked almost twenty wildfires in the Bighorn Basin, including the Red Canyon, Spring Creek, and Sleeper Ranch fires. The Red Canyon Fire has prompted evacuations east of the Wind River Canyon, though no evacuations have been issued from the other fires. Western Wyoming was under a red flag warning, due to very dry and windy conditions, but the fires are not spreading towards highways or towns. While the fires are driven by the dry and windy conditions, they are fueled by the invasive weed, cheatgrass. The area east of Thermopolis on the side of U.S. Route 20 is covered in cheatgrass, which is fueling the Red Canyon Fire and is damaging the native plants.

== List of wildfires ==
The following is a list of fires that burned more than 1,000 acres (400 ha), or produced significant structural damage or casualties.

Name	County	Acres	Start date	Containment date (Note: Containment means that fire crews have established and secured control lines around the fire's perimeter. These lines are barriers, like trenches or cleared vegetation, designed to stop the fire's spread. Containment reflects progress in managing the fire but does not necessarily mean the fire is under control or out.)	Notes	Ref
Horse	Sublette	2,802	June 13	July 25	Lightning-caused. Burned in the Big Piney Range District.	
Taylor Draw	Carbon	1,247	June 29	July 3	Unknown cause. Burned near Hanna.	
Vees	Washakie	5,245	July 26	August 16	Lightning-caused. Burned on BLM lands.	
Spring Creek	Washakie	3,594	August 13	September 6	Lightning-caused. Burned 30 miles (48 km) east of Worland.	
Red Canyon	Hot Springs	124,709	August 13	September 24	Lightning-caused. Burning east of Wind River Canyon and prompted evacuations.	
Sleeper Ranch	Park	20,657	August 14	September 11	Lightning-caused. Burned on BLM Worland lands.	
Dollar Lake	Sublette	19,467	August 21	October 6	Lightning-caused. Burned 32 miles (51 km) north of Pinedale.	
Willow Creek	Lincoln	4,066	August 22	September 25	Unknown cause. Burned 3 miles (4.8 km) south of Smoot and prompted evacuations. Closed U.S. Route 87.	

Perimeters of 2025 Wyoming wildfires (map data)

== See also ==
- 2025 United States wildfires
