= Grant, Montana =

- Census-designated place
- Location within Montana Location within the United States
- Coordinates: 45°00′35″N 113°04′03″W
- Country: United States
- State: Montana
- County: Beaverhead

Area
  - Total: 1.75 sq mi (4.53 km^{2})
  - Land: 1.75 sq mi (4.53 km^{2})
  - Water: 0 sq mi (0.00 km^{2})
- Elevation: 5,807 ft (1,770 m)

Population (2020)
  - Total: 19
  - Density: 10.9/sq mi (4.19/km^{2})
- Time zone: UTC-7 (Mountain (MST))
  - Summer (DST): UTC-6 (MDT)
- ZIP Code: 59725 (Dillon)
- Area code: 406
- FIPS code: 30-32350
- GNIS feature ID: 2804260

Grant is an unincorporated community and census-designated place (CDP) in Beaverhead County, Montana, United States. It is in the west-central part of the county, along Secondary Highway 324, 12 miles (19 km) west of Interstate 15 and 31 miles (50 km) southwest of Dillon, the county seat.

Grant was first listed as a CDP prior to the 2020 census.

As of the 2020 census, Grant had a population of 19.

== Demographics ==
Historical population
Census	Pop.	Note	%±
2020	19		—
U.S. Decennial Census
