= 2025 Idaho wildfires =

Natural disasters in the USA

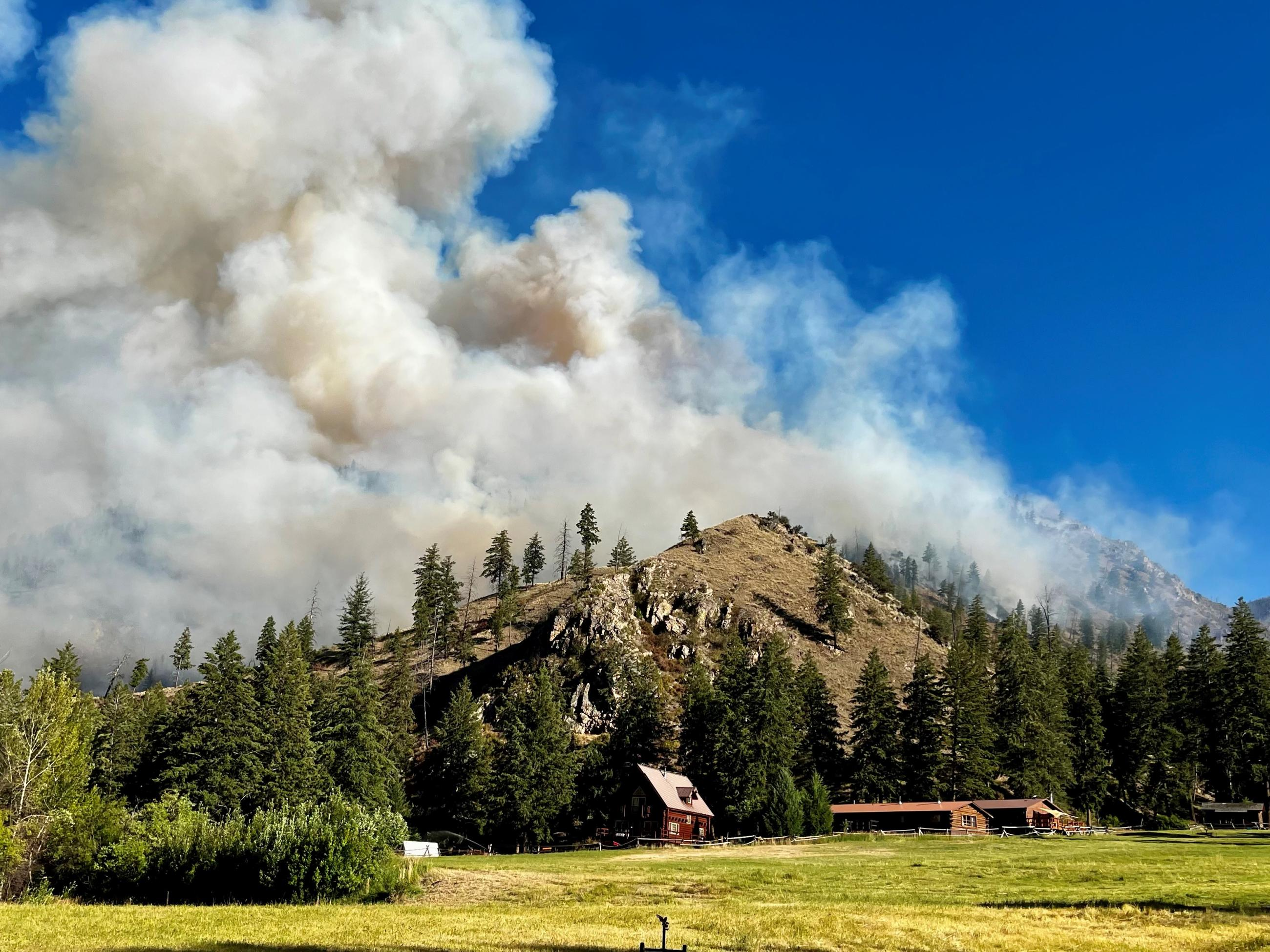
- Firing operations at Taylor Ranch on the Rush Fire in July 17, 2025.

The 2025 Idaho wildfires were a series of wildfires that burned throughout the U.S. state of Idaho.

== Background ==
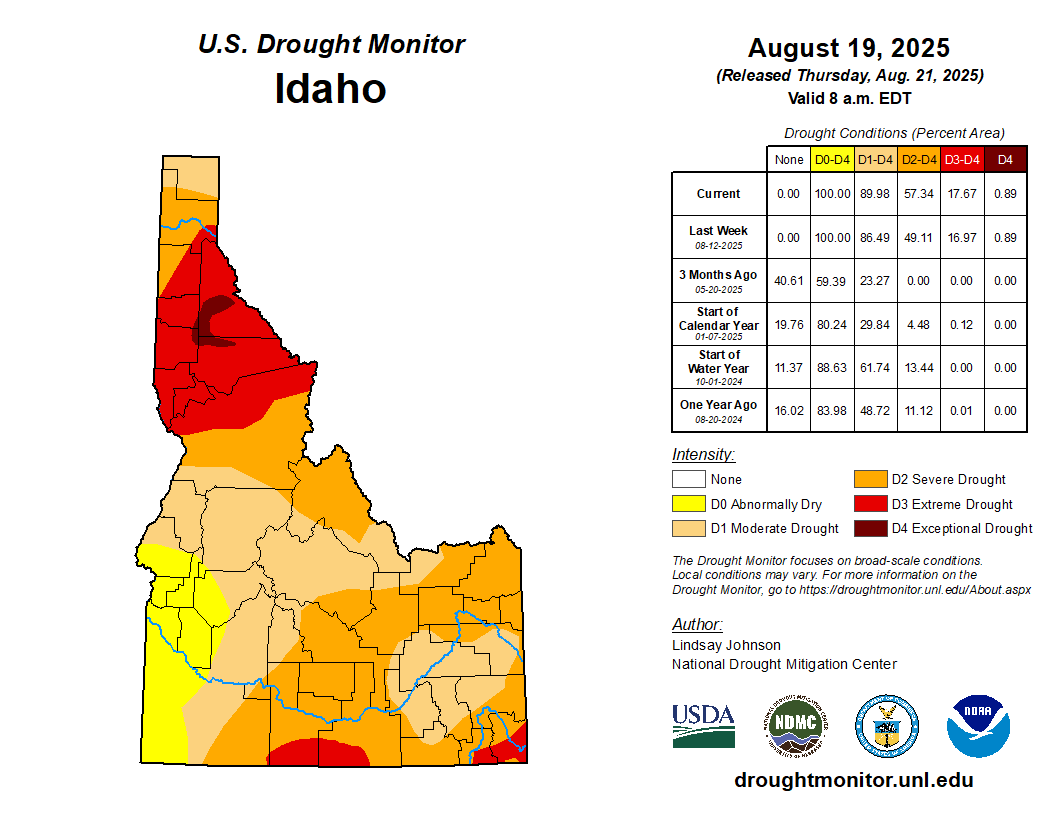
Idaho Drought Monitor on August 19, 2025

While the "fire season" in Idaho varies every year based on fire weather conditions, most wildfires occur from June to September. Fire activities normally increase in July and August because of drier conditions, hotter temperatures, and more lightning strikes from thunderstorms. However, wildfire severity can vary every year based on preseason conditions such as snowpack and the overcrowded growth of vegetation and dying trees.

== Summary ==
By early summer, Idaho’s 2025 wildfire season was already active, driven by dry fuels, low moisture levels, and abundant lightning storms. Several fires ignited across the state before July, especially in forested and mountainous regions.

Lightning storms in late August burned across northern Idaho. In the Coeur d’Alene zone alone, around 29 wildfires were started by lightning between August 29–30; most were controlled, though a few escaped initial attack lines. Among them, the Ulm Creek Fire (on the Coeur d’Alene River Ranger District) had grown from ~100 to ~400 acres under a Type-3 incident organization.

By late summer and early fall, several large fires had burned tens of thousands of acres across multiple counties. Smoke from these fires degraded air quality across many parts of the state, especially in central and northern Idaho. Fire crews faced supply constraints, rugged terrain, and the challenge of widely scattered fires stretching over remote landscapes.

Officials noted additional ignitions and fire growth were likely through October, especially with dry fuels and late-season lightning possibilities. In mid November, the Idaho Department of Lands Director reported the state's expenses for the 2025 wildfire season netted about $40.6 million. This marked a steep reduction from the 2024 Idaho wildfire season, where state wildfire expenses were estimated around $58 million.

== List of wildfires ==
The following is a list of fires that burned more than 1,000 acres (400 ha), or produced significant structural damage or casualties.

Name	County	Acres	Start date	Containment date (Note: Containment means that fire crews have established and secured control lines around the fire's perimeter. These lines are artificial barriers, like trenches or cleared vegetation, designed to stop the fire's spread, or natural barriers like rivers. Containment reflects progress in managing the fire but does not necessarily mean the fire is starved of fuel, under control, or put out.)	Notes	Ref
Twin Butte	Owyhee	2,600	May 28	May 29	Human-caused. Burned about 25 miles (40 km) south of Glenns Ferry.	
Ashlock	Payette	1,289	May 29	May 29	Burned on Bureau of Land Management lands. Many fire agencies responded to the fire.	
Dunes	Washington	1,060	June 3	June 4	Burned about 5.5 miles (8.9 km) away from Huntington, Oregon.	
Garden Creek	Bingham	5,418	July 1	July 3	Cause under investigation, but likely human-caused. Evacuations issued by tribal leaders near Fort Hall.	
Winter Camp	Owyhee	2,000	July 1	July 1	Unknown cause. Burned on Idaho Department of Lands area.	
Big Bear	Idaho	16,220	July 9	September 29	Lightning-caused. Burned 59 miles (95 km) northeast of McCall.	
Rush	Valley	7,908	July 10	September 29	Lightning-caused. Burned in Frank Church–River of No Return Wilderness.	
Grassy	Fremont	2,018	July 11	July 13	Undetermined cause. Burned 7 miles (11 km) north of Saint Anthony.	
Tindall	Owyhee	1,697	July 15	July 16	Undetermined cause. Burning 14 miles (23 km) southwest of Mountain Home.	
Buckboard	Oneida	1,698	July 15	July 18	Undetermined cause. Burned on BLM lands.	
Mm 64 I84	Ada	8,902	July 19	July 20	Affected Interstate 84. Evacuations were "recommended" for nearby residents. Destroyed one outbuilding. Burned 8 miles (13 km) southeast of Boise.	
Blackstone	Owyhee	21,896	July 29	August 6	Lightning-caused. Burned 16 miles (26 km) southeast of Bruneau.	
Elkhorn	Custer	1,356	July 29	September 11	Lightning-caused. Burning 45 miles (72 km) east of Challis.	
Lightning Creek	Bonner	2,523	July 30	October 21	Lightning-caused. Burned 7 miles (11 km) east of Hope.	
Range	Ada	26,922	July 31	August 2	Evacuations were ordered in South Pleasant Valley Road and West Thompson Road.	
Striker	Owyhee	6,000	July 31	August 1	Lightning-caused. Burned northeast of Murphy.	
Island Creek	Idaho	14,943	August 1	October 7	Lightning-caused. Burned 14 miles (23 km) north of Elk City.	
Rock	Valley, Adams	2,796	August 13	October 9	Consisted of several small lightning-caused wildfires in Boise National Forest.	
Box	Owyhee	4,413	August 13	August 29	Lightning-caused. Burned 56 miles (90 km) southwest of Grandview.	
Sunset	Bonner	3,183	August 13	September 2	Cause under investigation. Burned near Lake Pend Orielle and destroyed twenty structures, including six houses.	
Mire	Clearwater, Idaho	1,388	August 13	September 21	Lightning-caused. Burned 35 miles (56 km) northeast of Lowell.	
Hooker Creek	Malheur (OR), Owyhee	2,280	August 16	August 18	Unknown cause. Started in Oregon and burned 14 miles (23 km) east of Jordan Valley, Oregon.	
East	Idaho	2,250	August 20	October 29	Lightning-caused. Burned 20 miles (32 km) northwest of Powell.	
Rhoda Creek	Idaho	2,502	August 20		Lightning-caused. Burned 25 miles (40 km) northeast of Lowell.	
Split Top	Blaine	5,447	August 23	August 24	Human-caused. Burned 14 miles (23 km) northwest of Aberdeen.	
Walk	Idaho	1,050	August 23	October 30	Lightning-caused. Burned 21 miles (34 km) east of Elk City.	
Ulm Creek	Shoshone, Sanders (MT)	2,929	August 30	December 10	Lighting-caused. Burned 16 miles (26 km) north of Prichard.	
White Pine	Latah	1,045	August 31	November 19	Unknown cause. Burned 7 miles (11 km) northeast of Harvard. Prompted evacuations and closed White Pine Campground.	

Perimeters of 2025 Idaho wildfires (map data)

== See also ==
- 2025 United States wildfires
