= Wise River, Montana =

Unincorporated community in Beaverhead County, Montana, United States

Coordinates: 45°47′29″N 112°56′58″W

- Census-Designated Place
- Interactive map of Wise River, Montana
- Country: United States
- State: Montana
- County: Beaverhead

Area
  - Total: 0.74 sq mi (1.91 km^{2})
  - Land: 0.74 sq mi (1.91 km^{2})
  - Water: 0 sq mi (0.00 km^{2})
- Elevation: 5,653 ft (1,723 m)

Population (2020)
  - Total: 42
  - Density: 56.9/sq mi (21.95/km^{2})
- FIPS code: 30-07300
- GNIS feature ID: 2804265

Wise River is an unincorporated community in northern Beaverhead County, Montana, United States. As of the 2020 census, Wise River had a population of 42.

This community takes its name from the Wise River, which flows into the Big Hole River nearby. A post office was established in 1913.

The Elkhorn-Coolidge Historic District on the National Register of Historic Places is nearby. The district includes the Elkhorn mine site and the ghost town of Coolidge. The mine was for silver and began operation in 1872.

== Demographics ==
Historical population
| Census | Pop. | Note | %± |
|---|---|---|---|
| 2020 | 42 | | — |
U.S. Decennial Census

== Climate ==
Wise River has a subarctic climate (Köppen Dfc).

Climate data for Wise River, Montana, 1991–2020 normals, extremes 1943–present: 5730ft (1747m)
| Month | Jan | Feb | Mar | Apr | May | Jun | Jul | Aug | Sep | Oct | Nov | Dec | Year |
|---|---|---|---|---|---|---|---|---|---|---|---|---|---|
| Record high °F (°C) | 56 (13) | 59 (15) | 70 (21) | 77 (25) | 87 (31) | 95 (35) | 94 (34) | 94 (34) | 93 (34) | 84 (29) | 69 (21) | 57 (14) | 95 (35) |
| Mean maximum °F (°C) | 45.0 (7.2) | 47.5 (8.6) | 56.5 (13.6) | 69.1 (20.6) | 76.4 (24.7) | 84.0 (28.9) | 89.2 (31.8) | 89.3 (31.8) | 85.3 (29.6) | 73.4 (23.0) | 58.0 (14.4) | 45.7 (7.6) | 90.9 (32.7) |
| Mean daily maximum °F (°C) | 31.4 (−0.3) | 33.3 (0.7) | 43.0 (6.1) | 51.3 (10.7) | 61.2 (16.2) | 68.8 (20.4) | 78.8 (26.0) | 78.9 (26.1) | 69.9 (21.1) | 55.7 (13.2) | 38.9 (3.8) | 30.0 (−1.1) | 53.4 (11.9) |
| Daily mean °F (°C) | 19.6 (−6.9) | 21.5 (−5.8) | 28.9 (−1.7) | 36.7 (2.6) | 44.7 (7.1) | 52.0 (11.1) | 58.4 (14.7) | 57.4 (14.1) | 49.7 (9.8) | 39.2 (4.0) | 26.4 (−3.1) | 18.2 (−7.7) | 37.7 (3.2) |
| Mean daily minimum °F (°C) | 7.8 (−13.4) | 9.6 (−12.4) | 14.9 (−9.5) | 22.1 (−5.5) | 28.3 (−2.1) | 35.3 (1.8) | 38.0 (3.3) | 36.0 (2.2) | 29.5 (−1.4) | 22.7 (−5.2) | 14.0 (−10.0) | 6.5 (−14.2) | 22.1 (−5.5) |
| Mean minimum °F (°C) | −21.6 (−29.8) | −17.9 (−27.7) | −5.4 (−20.8) | 9.3 (−12.6) | 15.2 (−9.3) | 24.8 (−4.0) | 29.8 (−1.2) | 26.7 (−2.9) | 18.1 (−7.7) | 5.8 (−14.6) | −6.3 (−21.3) | −18.3 (−27.9) | −28.3 (−33.5) |
| Record low °F (°C) | −38 (−39) | −41 (−41) | −26 (−32) | −6 (−21) | 7 (−14) | 20 (−7) | 24 (−4) | 19 (−7) | 6 (−14) | −13 (−25) | −23 (−31) | −38 (−39) | −41 (−41) |
| Average precipitation inches (mm) | 0.55 (14) | 0.53 (13) | 0.64 (16) | 0.98 (25) | 1.90 (48) | 1.98 (50) | 1.36 (35) | 0.99 (25) | 1.21 (31) | 1.12 (28) | 0.94 (24) | 0.73 (19) | 12.93 (328) |
| Average precipitation days (≥ 0.01 in) | 9.5 | 8.2 | 9.4 | 9.8 | 12.3 | 11.6 | 8.3 | 7.2 | 6.7 | 7.7 | 8.5 | 9.4 | 108.6 |
Source 1: NOAA
Source 2: XMACIS2

== Education ==
Wise River provides elementary education. High school is at Beaverhead County High School.
