= Wisdom, Montana =

- Census-designated place
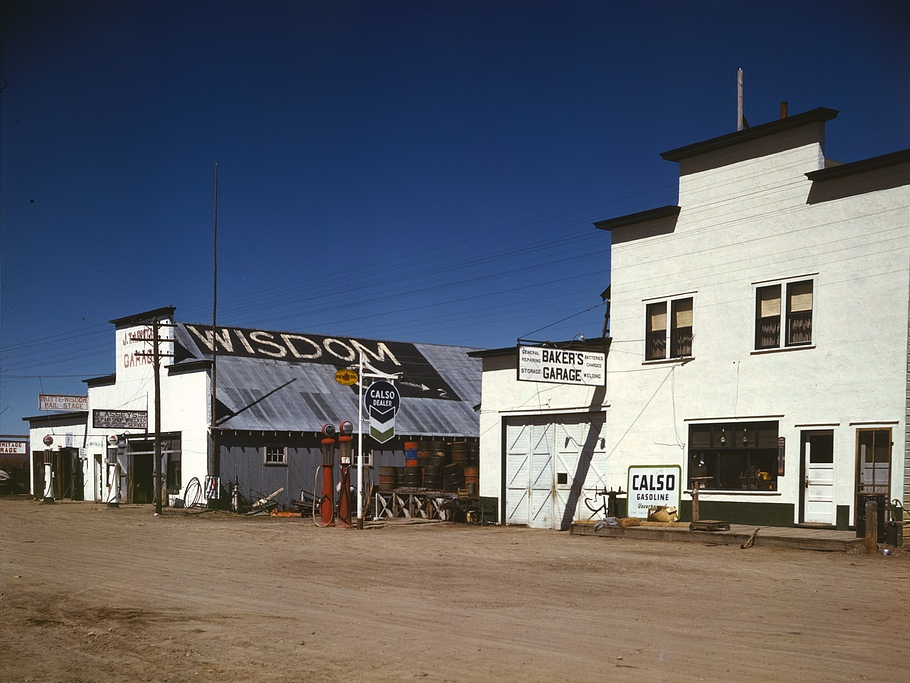
- Wisdom in April 1942

- Location of Wisdom, Montana
- Coordinates: 45°36′41″N 113°26′49″W
- Country: United States
- State: Montana
- County: Beaverhead

Area
  - Total: 1.02 sq mi (2.63 km^{2})
  - Land: 1.01 sq mi (2.61 km^{2})
  - Water: 0.0077 sq mi (0.02 km^{2})
- Elevation: 6,063 ft (1,848 m)

Population (2020)
  - Total: 104
  - Density: 103.2/sq mi (39.84/km^{2})
- Time zone: UTC−7 (Mountain (MST))
  - Summer (DST): UTC−6 (MDT)
- ZIP code: 59761
- Area code: 406
- FIPS code: 30-81250
- GNIS feature ID: 2409617

Wisdom is a census-designated place (CDP) in Beaverhead County, Montana, United States. As of the 2020 census, Wisdom had a population of 104. The ZIP Code of the area is 59761. The town includes three tourist lodgings, service station, grocery, school (K-8), post office and a Forest Service office.

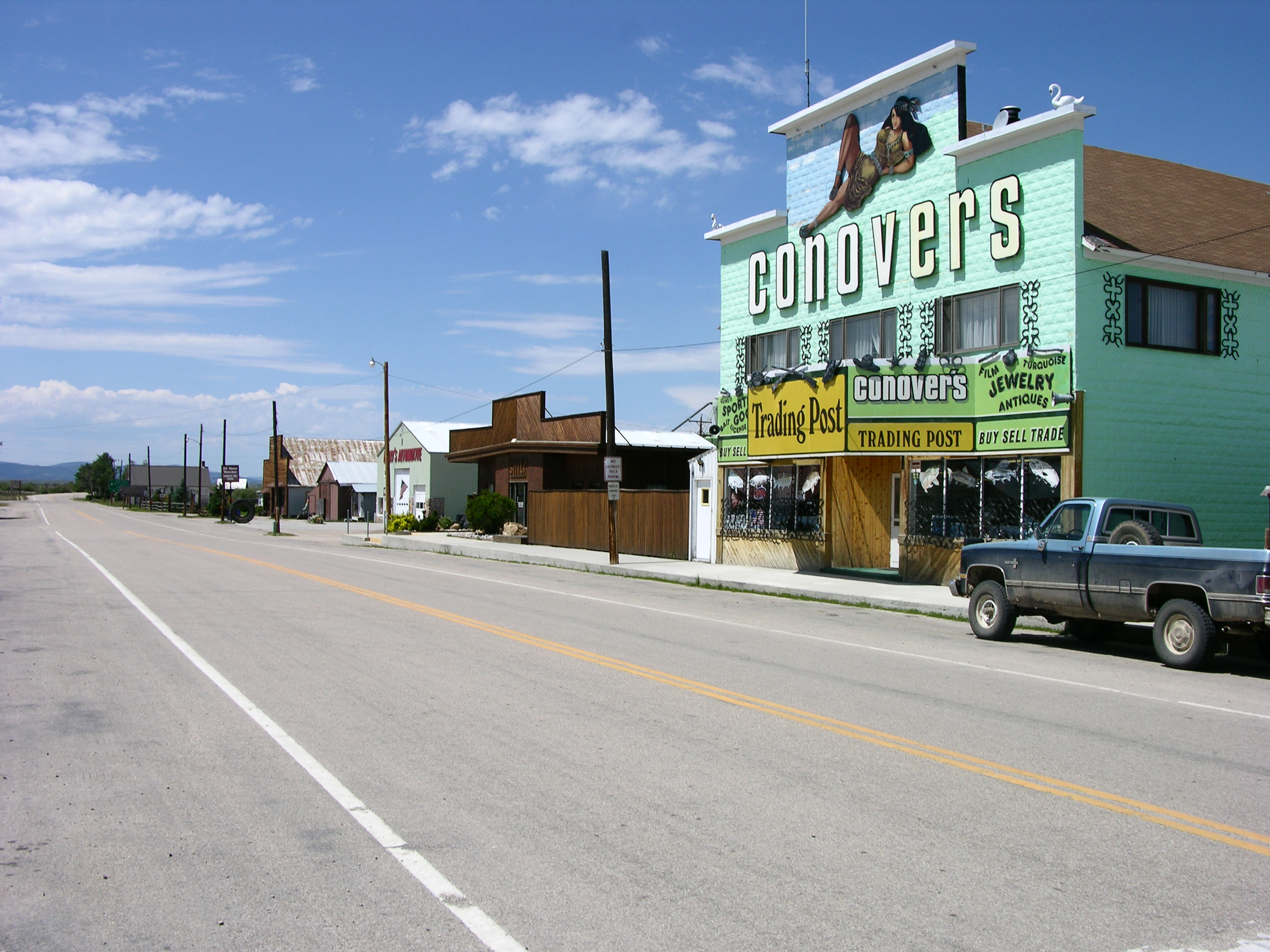
The "Trading Post" store in Wisdom, Montana

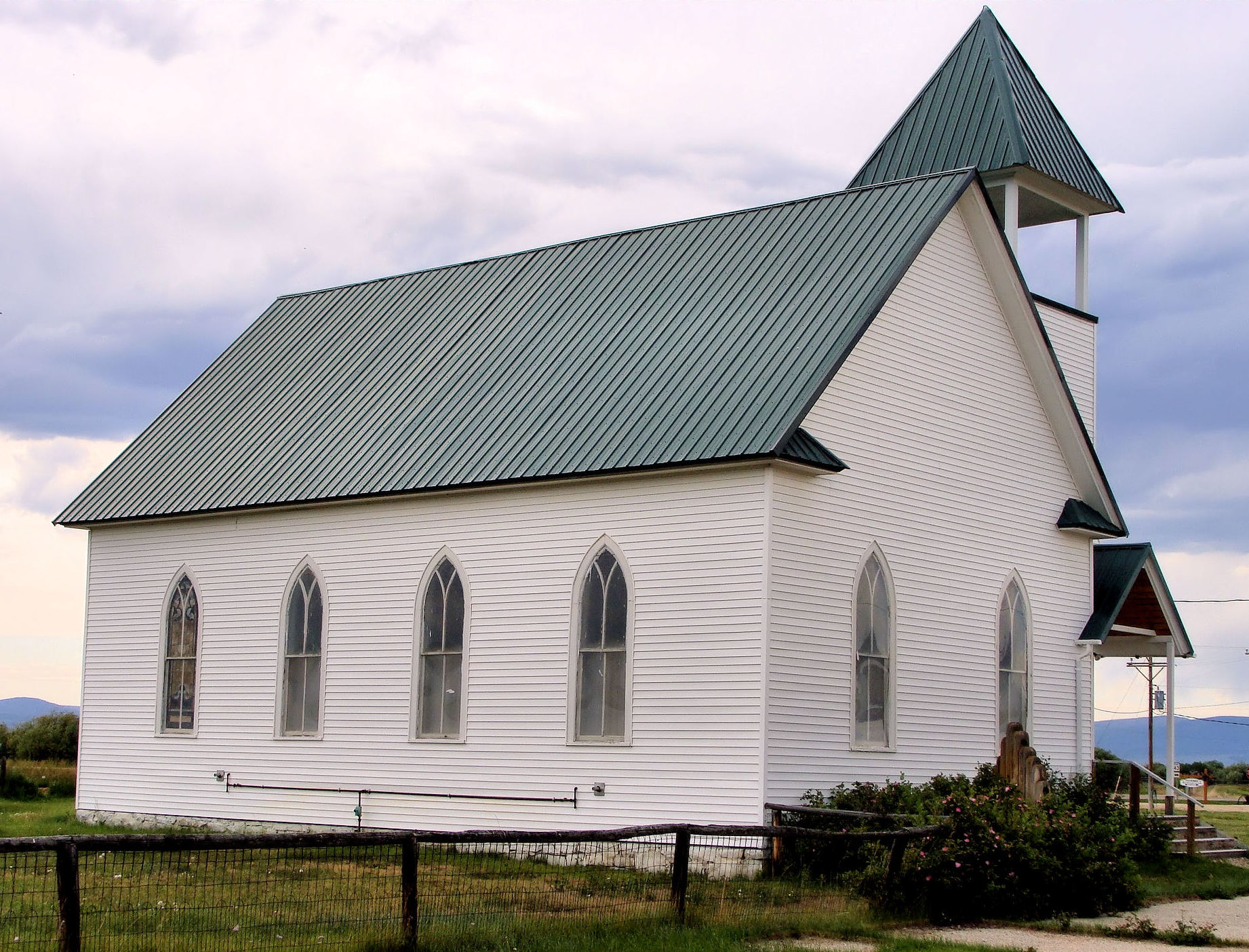
Church of the Big Hole in Wisdom

== History ==
Wisdom was named for the Wisdom River, which is now named the Big Hole River, that passes through the town. The post office opened in 1884.

Big Hole National Battlefield is located ten miles west of Wisdom. The battle was fought in 1877 between the Nez Perce and U.S. Army.

== Geography ==
According to the United States Census Bureau, the CDP has a total area of 0.99 square miles (2.56 km^{2}), of which 0.98 square miles (2.54 km^{2}) is land and 0.0077 square miles (0.02 km^{2}), or 0.82%, is water. Wisdom's average elevation is 6,245 feet (1,903 m), about 1.2 miles above sea level.

Wisdom is located along Montana Highway 43. Tweedy Mountain is nearby as is West Goat Peak.

=== Climate ===
Wisdom, owing to its high altitude and northerly location, has a subalpine climate (Köppen Dfc) with long, cold, dry winters and short summers with very warm afternoons and cold, clear mornings. With over 277 mornings each year below freezing and only July ever completely frost-free, Wisdom is in terms of frequency of frost one of the coldest places in the United States. During major cold waves, Wisdom’s location in an enclosed valley can make for exceptionally low temperatures: −55 °F (−48.3 °C) was reached during a great cold wave on December 23, 1983, and −50 °F or −45.6 °C has been reached during seven years, though not since February 4, 1989. Typically there are 47 mornings falling to or below 0 °F or −17.8 °C, and as many as seven fall as low as −25 °F or −31.7 °C, whilst 69.8 afternoons do not top freezing, a tally twice as large as central Montana areas affected by warm chinook winds.

Minimum temperatures during spring do not typically stay above freezing until well into June, although the average last spring ice day date is April 1 and the first fall ice day November 1. Low winter precipitation limits both snowfall and snow depth: the annual mean fall is 42.3 inches or 1.07 metres, and the mean peak snow cover 11 inches or 0.28 metres, with the most snow on the ground being 32 inches (0.81 m) on January 2, 1943. Snow cover is usually gone by the end of March, and despite occasional light snowfalls in May, snow on the ground in that month has not been recorded since 1953. Precipitation is heaviest during the spring, but the enclosed valley location means most moisture is always captured before reaching Wisdom: the wettest month since records began in 1923 has been May 1981 with 4.32 inches (109.7 mm), whilst the wettest calendar year has been 1967 with 15.74 inches (399.8 mm) and the driest 1974 when only 5.60 inches (142.2 mm) fell.

Although summer nights are chilly and even frosty, days can be very warm or even hot, although only 1.3 afternoons typically rise above 90 °F or 32.2 °C and 100 °F or 37.8 °C has never been recorded: Wisdom’s hottest temperature is 98 °F or 36.7 °C on July 13, 2002, and the hottest minimum 62 °F or 16.7 °C on July 23, 1936. On average only two mornings remain above 50 °F or 10 °C each summer, and Wisdom has never recorded so high a minimum between October 20 and May 4 inclusive. By the end of August mornings fall to freezing in five-eighths of all years, and in seven-eighths by the end of September, with the weather continuing to cool into winter with the first minimum under zero expected on November 10.

Climate data for Wisdom, Montana 1991–2020 normals, 1923-2020 extremes: 6060ft (1847m)
Month	Jan	Feb	Mar	Apr	May	Jun	Jul	Aug	Sep	Oct	Nov	Dec	Year
Record high °F (°C)	53 (12)	57 (14)	68 (20)	80 (27)	89 (32)	95 (35)	98 (37)	96 (36)	90 (32)	81 (27)	66 (19)	58 (14)	98 (37)
Mean maximum °F (°C)	43.3 (6.3)	45.0 (7.2)	53.4 (11.9)	66.8 (19.3)	75.5 (24.2)	82.8 (28.2)	88.8 (31.6)	87.7 (30.9)	82.7 (28.2)	71.8 (22.1)	55.3 (12.9)	43.1 (6.2)	89.9 (32.2)
Mean daily maximum °F (°C)	26.3 (−3.2)	29.5 (−1.4)	38.9 (3.8)	48.8 (9.3)	59.2 (15.1)	67.4 (19.7)	78.1 (25.6)	77.3 (25.2)	67.8 (19.9)	53.1 (11.7)	35.9 (2.2)	25.3 (−3.7)	50.6 (10.4)
Daily mean °F (°C)	14.7 (−9.6)	16.2 (−8.8)	25.6 (−3.6)	34.9 (1.6)	43.8 (6.6)	51.4 (10.8)	57.8 (14.3)	55.6 (13.1)	47.8 (8.8)	37.0 (2.8)	23.2 (−4.9)	14.1 (−9.9)	35.2 (1.8)
Mean daily minimum °F (°C)	3.1 (−16.1)	3.0 (−16.1)	12.4 (−10.9)	21.0 (−6.1)	28.4 (−2.0)	35.4 (1.9)	37.6 (3.1)	33.9 (1.1)	27.7 (−2.4)	20.9 (−6.2)	10.5 (−11.9)	2.9 (−16.2)	19.7 (−6.8)
Mean minimum °F (°C)	−27.8 (−33.2)	−26.5 (−32.5)	−10.4 (−23.6)	5.3 (−14.8)	15.1 (−9.4)	24.3 (−4.3)	28.6 (−1.9)	24.3 (−4.3)	14.2 (−9.9)	2.6 (−16.3)	−12.9 (−24.9)	−23.4 (−30.8)	−35.7 (−37.6)
Record low °F (°C)	−52 (−47)	−52 (−47)	−35 (−37)	−20 (−29)	6 (−14)	16 (−9)	20 (−7)	11 (−12)	1 (−17)	−23 (−31)	−34 (−37)	−55 (−48)	−55 (−48)
Average precipitation inches (mm)	0.59 (15)	0.59 (15)	0.77 (20)	1.12 (28)	1.75 (44)	2.12 (54)	1.20 (30)	0.79 (20)	1.09 (28)	0.84 (21)	0.77 (20)	0.67 (17)	12.3 (312)
Average snowfall inches (cm)	9.0 (23)	10.4 (26)	8.0 (20)	5.3 (13)	2.7 (6.9)	1.2 (3.0)	0.0 (0.0)	0.0 (0.0)	0.8 (2.0)	1.5 (3.8)	8.5 (22)	10.0 (25)	57.4 (144.7)
Source 1: NOAA
Source 2: XMACIS2 (1999-2020 snowfall, records & monthly max/mins)

Climate data for Wisdom, Montana (1971–2000; extremes since 1923)
Month	Jan	Feb	Mar	Apr	May	Jun	Jul	Aug	Sep	Oct	Nov	Dec	Year
Record high °F (°C)	53 (12)	55 (13)	68 (20)	80 (27)	85 (29)	91 (33)	98 (37)	96 (36)	89 (32)	81 (27)	66 (19)	53 (12)	98 (37)
Mean daily maximum °F (°C)	27.6 (−2.4)	32.6 (0.3)	40.8 (4.9)	50.7 (10.4)	60.6 (15.9)	69.9 (21.1)	78.6 (25.9)	78.2 (25.7)	68.0 (20.0)	55.7 (13.2)	37.5 (3.1)	28.0 (−2.2)	52.7 (11.5)
Mean daily minimum °F (°C)	0.4 (−17.6)	2.5 (−16.4)	11.9 (−11.2)	20.4 (−6.4)	28.0 (−2.2)	35.0 (1.7)	36.6 (2.6)	33.9 (1.1)	26.3 (−3.2)	19.2 (−7.1)	10.8 (−11.8)	1.4 (−17.0)	18.9 (−7.3)
Record low °F (°C)	−52 (−47)	−52 (−47)	−35 (−37)	−20 (−29)	8 (−13)	19 (−7)	20 (−7)	11 (−12)	1 (−17)	−23 (−31)	−34 (−37)	−55 (−48)	−55 (−48)
Average precipitation inches (mm)	0.62 (16)	0.51 (13)	0.67 (17)	0.98 (25)	1.70 (43)	1.78 (45)	1.28 (33)	1.12 (28)	0.99 (25)	0.74 (19)	0.81 (21)	0.70 (18)	11.9 (303)
Average snowfall inches (cm)	5.1 (13)	9.8 (25)	9.7 (25)	3.4 (8.6)	1.0 (2.5)	trace	0.0 (0.0)	trace	0.2 (0.51)	0.4 (1.0)	6.7 (17)	6.0 (15)	42.3 (107)
Average precipitation days (≥ 0.01 inch)	9.5	8.1	10.3	10.8	13.0	11.9	8.6	8.3	7.5	6.9	10.6	10.3	115.8
Average snowy days (≥ 0.1 in)	2.6	2.4	1.9	1.2	0.4	0	0	0	0.1	0.3	1.3	2.1	12.3
Source 1: National Oceanic and Atmospheric Administration
Source 2: National Weather Service, Great Falls, MT

== Demographics ==
Historical population
Census	Pop.	Note	%±
2000	114		—
2010	98		−14.0%
2020	104		6.1%
U.S. Decennial Census

=== 2000 Census data ===
As of the 2000 census, there were 114 people, 61 households, and 32 families residing in the CDP. The population density was 120.0 inhabitants per square mile (46.3/km^{2}). There were 88 housing units at an average density of 92.7 per square mile (35.8/km^{2}). The racial makeup of the CDP was 96.49% White, 1.75% Native American, 1.75% from other races. Hispanic or Latino of any race were 1.75% of the population.

There were 61 households, out of which 11.5% had children under the age of 18 living with them, 47.5% were married couples living together, 1.6% had a female householder with no husband present, and 47.5% were non-families. It is unknown how many male householders with no wife present existed. 41.0% of all households were made up of individuals, and 11.5% had someone living alone who was 65 years of age or older. The average household size was 1.85 and the average family size was 2.47.

In the CDP, the population dispersal was 12.3% under the age of 18, 4.4% from 18 to 24, 28.9% from 25 to 44, 43.0% from 45 to 64, and 11.4% who were 65 years of age or older. The median age was 49 years. For every 100 females, there were 103.6 males. For every 100 females age 18 and over, there were 122.2 males. The median income for a household in the CDP was $24,583, and the median income for a family was $41,875. Males had a median income of $27,500 versus $21,406 for females. The per capita income for the CDP was $18,172. There were 11.1% of families and 12.9% of the population living below the poverty line, including no under eighteens and 33.3% of those over 64.

== Education ==
Wisdom schools provides education from kindergarten through 8th grade. In 2021, 7 students were enrolled.
