= Beaverhead County, Montana =

County in Montana, United States

- County
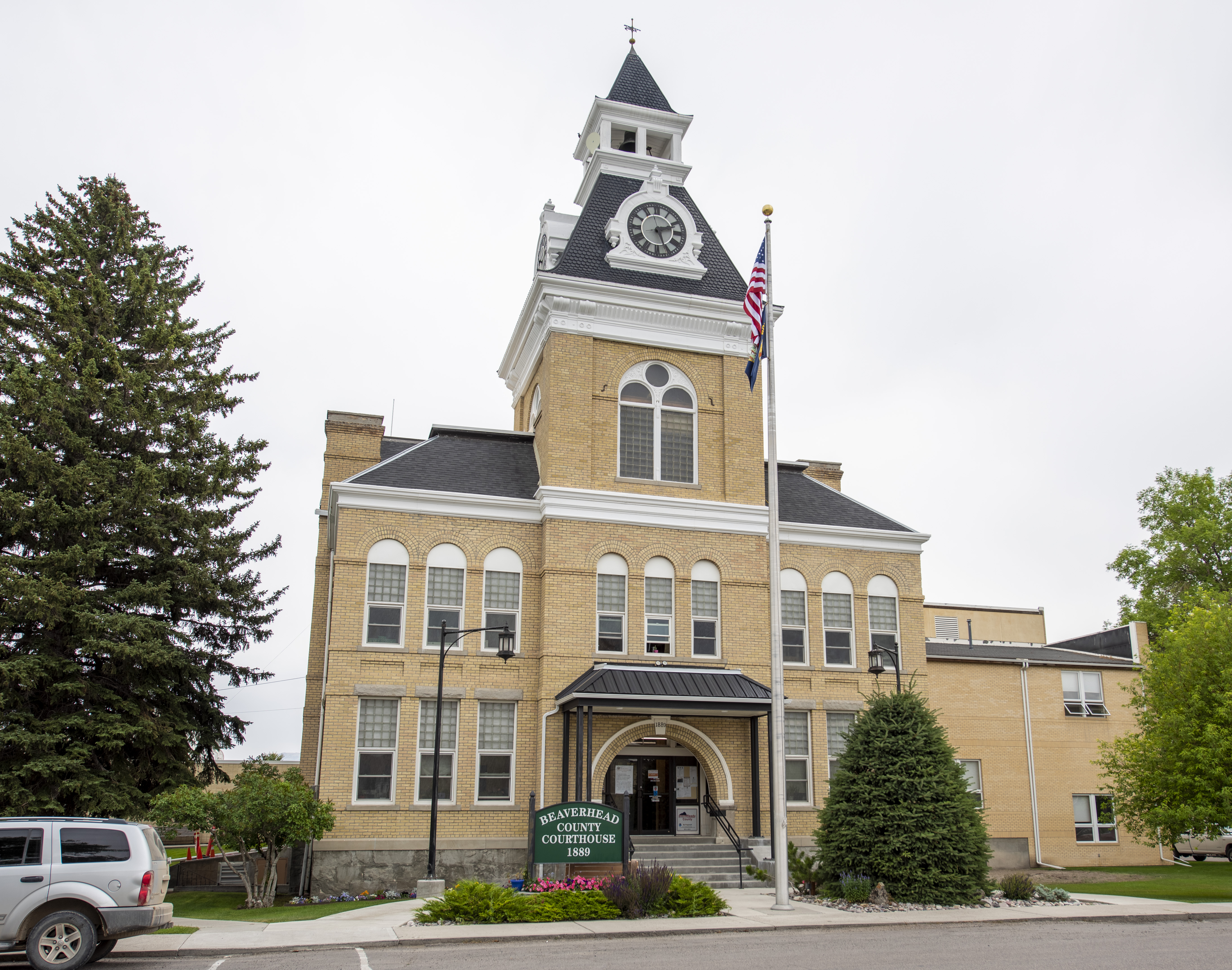
- Beaverhead County Courthouse

- Location within the U.S. state of Montana
- Coordinates: 45°07′N 112°54′W
- Country: United States
- State: Montana
- Founded: 1865
- Seat: Dillon
- Largest city: Dillon

Area
  - Total: 5,572 sq mi (14,430 km^{2})
  - Land: 5,542 sq mi (14,350 km^{2})
  - Water: 30 sq mi (78 km^{2}) 0.5%

Population (2020)
  - Total: 9,371
  - Estimate (2025): 10,043 ▲
  - Density: 1.8/sq mi (0.69/km^{2})
- Time zone: UTC−7 (Mountain)
  - Summer (DST): UTC−6 (MDT)
- Congressional district: 1st
- Website: beaverheadcountymt.gov
- Montana county number 18

Beaverhead County is the largest county by area in the U.S. state of Montana. As of the 2020 census, the population was 9,371. Its county seat is Dillon. The county was founded in 1865.

Much of the perimeter of the county is the Continental Divide, including its entire border with the state of Idaho. The divide heads east into Montana at the county border with Ravalli County, between Lost Trail Pass and Chief Joseph Pass.

== History ==
The county name is derived from a rock formation, which the Shoshone described as being shaped like a beaver's head.

The original county seat was the gold-mining town of Bannack. In 1881 it was moved to Dillon.

== Geography ==
According to the United States Census Bureau, the county has a total area of 5,572 square miles (14,430 km^{2}), of which 5,542 square miles (14,350 km^{2}) is land and 30 square miles (78 km^{2}) (0.3%) is water. It is the largest county in Montana by area. Beaverhead impact structure is in the area. The Big Hole River (formerly called Wisdom River) runs through the county.

=== Adjacent counties ===
- Ravalli County - northwest
- Deer Lodge County - north
- Silver Bow County - north
- Madison County - east
- Fremont County, Idaho - southeast
- Clark County, Idaho - south
- Lemhi County, Idaho - west

=== Major highways ===
- I-15 / US 91
- I-15 BL
- MT 41
- MT 43
- S-278
- S-324

=== National protected areas ===
- Beaverhead National Forest (part)
- Big Hole National Battlefield
- Nez Perce National Historical Park (part)
- Red Rock Lakes National Wildlife Refuge

== Demographics ==
Historical population
Census	Pop.	Note	%±
1870	722		—
1880	2,712		275.6%
1890	4,655		71.6%
1900	5,615		20.6%
1910	6,446		14.8%
1920	7,369		14.3%
1930	6,654		−9.7%
1940	6,943		4.3%
1950	6,671		−3.9%
1960	7,194		7.8%
1970	8,187		13.8%
1980	8,186		0.0%
1990	8,424		2.9%
2000	9,202		9.2%
2010	9,246		0.5%
2020	9,371		1.4%
2025 (est.)	10,043	▲	7.2%
U.S. Decennial Census:

=== 2020 census ===
As of the 2020 census, the county had a population of 9,371.

Of the residents, 19.7% were under the age of 18 and 24.1% were 65 years of age or older; the median age was 43.9 years. For every 100 females there were 102.0 males, and for every 100 females age 18 and over there were 101.1 males. 47.3% of residents lived in urban areas and 52.7% lived in rural areas.

The racial makeup of the county was 90.2% White, 0.3% Black or African American, 1.4% American Indian and Alaska Native, 0.4% Asian, 1.5% from some other race, and 6.1% from two or more races. Hispanic or Latino residents of any race comprised 4.6% of the population.

There were 4,108 households in the county, of which 22.9% had children under the age of 18 living with them and 23.8% had a female householder with no spouse or partner present. About 32.9% of all households were made up of individuals and 14.6% had someone living alone who was 65 years of age or older.

There were 4,918 housing units, of which 16.5% were vacant. Among occupied housing units, 65.1% were owner-occupied and 34.9% were renter-occupied. The homeowner vacancy rate was 1.9% and the rental vacancy rate was 8.2%.

=== 2010 census ===
As of the 2010 census, there were 9,246 people, 4,014 households, and 2,383 families living in the county. The population density was 1.7 inhabitants per square mile (0.66/km^{2}). There were 5,273 housing units at an average density of 1.0 per square mile (0.39/km^{2}). The racial makeup of the county was 94.8% white, 1.4% American Indian, 0.4% Pacific islander, 0.4% Asian, 0.2% black or African American, 1.2% from other races, and 1.6% from two or more races. Those of Hispanic or Latino origin made up 3.7% of the population. In terms of ancestry, 26.5% were German, 23.9% were English, 15.4% were Irish, 7.9% were Norwegian, 6.5% were Scottish, and 3.4% were American.

Of the 4,014 households, 23.8% had children under the age of 18 living with them, 49.9% were married couples living together, 6.4% had a female householder with no husband present, 40.6% were non-families, and 33.0% of all households were made up of individuals. The average household size was 2.19 and the average family size was 2.79. The median age was 42.0 years.

The median income for a household in the county was $38,264 and the median income for a family was $53,036. Males had a median income of $35,568 versus $27,314 for females. The per capita income for the county was $21,110. About 10.8% of families and 15.0% of the population were below the poverty line, including 14.4% of those under age 18 and 6.0% of those age 65 or over.

== Politics ==
Beaverhead is a heavily Republican county. It has not voted for a Democratic Presidential candidate since 1936.

The County government is overseen by a Board of Commissioners. In 2026 an option for a self-government charter was proprosed but received 59% "no" votes.

United States presidential election results for Beaverhead County, Montana
Year	Republican		Democratic		Third party(ies)	
Year	No.	%	No.	%	No.	%
1904	1,021	59.81%	650	38.08%	36	2.11%
1908	878	51.95%	739	43.73%	73	4.32%
1912	708	38.23%	713	38.50%	431	23.27%
1916	1,455	48.39%	1,463	48.65%	89	2.96%
1920	2,049	68.80%	833	27.97%	96	3.22%
1924	1,386	50.55%	766	27.94%	590	21.52%
1928	1,906	62.21%	1,144	37.34%	14	0.46%
1932	1,418	43.09%	1,834	55.73%	39	1.19%
1936	1,304	36.86%	2,153	60.85%	81	2.29%
1940	1,725	51.17%	1,632	48.41%	14	0.42%
1944	1,556	54.94%	1,263	44.60%	13	0.46%
1948	1,583	52.68%	1,356	45.12%	66	2.20%
1952	2,196	70.20%	920	29.41%	12	0.38%
1956	1,955	65.52%	1,029	34.48%	0	0.00%
1960	1,731	56.88%	1,307	42.95%	5	0.16%
1964	1,754	54.29%	1,469	45.47%	8	0.25%
1968	1,896	61.04%	853	27.46%	357	11.49%
1972	2,460	71.99%	775	22.68%	182	5.33%
1976	2,461	69.46%	1,013	28.59%	69	1.95%
1980	2,955	72.02%	842	20.52%	306	7.46%
1984	3,044	75.44%	942	23.35%	49	1.21%
1988	2,668	66.73%	1,274	31.87%	56	1.40%
1992	1,746	41.97%	1,098	26.39%	1,316	31.63%
1996	2,414	60.06%	1,164	28.96%	441	10.97%
2000	3,113	74.19%	799	19.04%	284	6.77%
2004	3,067	72.30%	1,103	26.00%	72	1.70%
2008	3,008	63.15%	1,617	33.95%	138	2.90%
2012	3,289	68.35%	1,371	28.49%	152	3.16%
2016	3,353	69.15%	1,143	23.57%	353	7.28%
2020	3,923	69.30%	1,608	28.40%	130	2.30%
2024	4,058	70.04%	1,543	26.63%	193	3.33%

== Economy ==
Beaverhead County is one of the largest cattle and hay producing areas of Montana. Barrett's Minerals, one of the world's largest talc mines, calls Beaverhead County home. In 2009, Barrett Hospital and Healthcare was the largest private employer in the county.

== Education ==
The University of Montana Western is in Dillon.

== Communities ==
=== City ===
- Dillon (county seat)

=== Town ===
- Lima

=== Census-designated places ===
- Argenta
- Dell
- Dewey
- Glen
- Grant
- Jackson
- Lakeview
- Maverick Mountain
- Wisdom
- Wise River

=== Other unincorporated communities ===
- Apex
- Barretts
- Bond
- Dalys
- Elkhorn Hot Springs
- Ford
- Kidd
- Monida
- Polaris
- Red Rock

=== Former communities ===
- Armstead - flooded by Clark County Reservoir in 1964
- Bannack (presently a National Historic Monument and site of Bannack State Park)
- Hecla
- Lion City

== Notable people ==
- Joseph Poindexter, later Territorial Governor of Hawaii, served as County Attorney here.
- Thomas Savage (1915-2003) spent his childhood and teen years on his family's ranch in Beaverhead County. His experiences there informed his best known novels, The Power of the Dog and The Sheep Queen.

== See also ==
- List of lakes in Beaverhead County, Montana
- List of mountains in Beaverhead County, Montana
- National Register of Historic Places listings in Beaverhead County, Montana
