= Trout and Salmonid Collection at Montana State University =

Trout and Salmonid Collection
- 45°40′0.1302″N 111°2′54.5756″W
- Location: Montana State University Library, Bozeman, Montana, United States
- Type: Special Collection
- Established: 1999

Collection
- Items collected: Works encompassing biology, ecology, angling, politics, economics, and the culinary arts; spiritual, literary and philosophical works; books, periodicals, government publications, and scientific reports; diaries, theses and dissertations.
- Size: ~11,000
- Criteria for collection: Related to study of trout and salmonids

Other information
- Website: www.lib.montana.edu/trout/

The Trout and Salmonid Collection is a special collection of literature and archives in the Montana State University Library's Merrill G. Burlingame Special Collections Library. The collection is also known as The Bud Lilly Trout and Salmonid Collection, named after Bud Lilly who was instrumental in starting the collection. The approximately 20,000-volume collection, established in 2000, is devoted to preserving literary (fiction and non-fiction), scientific, government and media resources related to all aspects of trout and other salmonids. The collection contains materials in many languages and is not restricted by geography. It is considered a world-class collection of international significance relative to the study of trout and salmonids.

== Creation ==
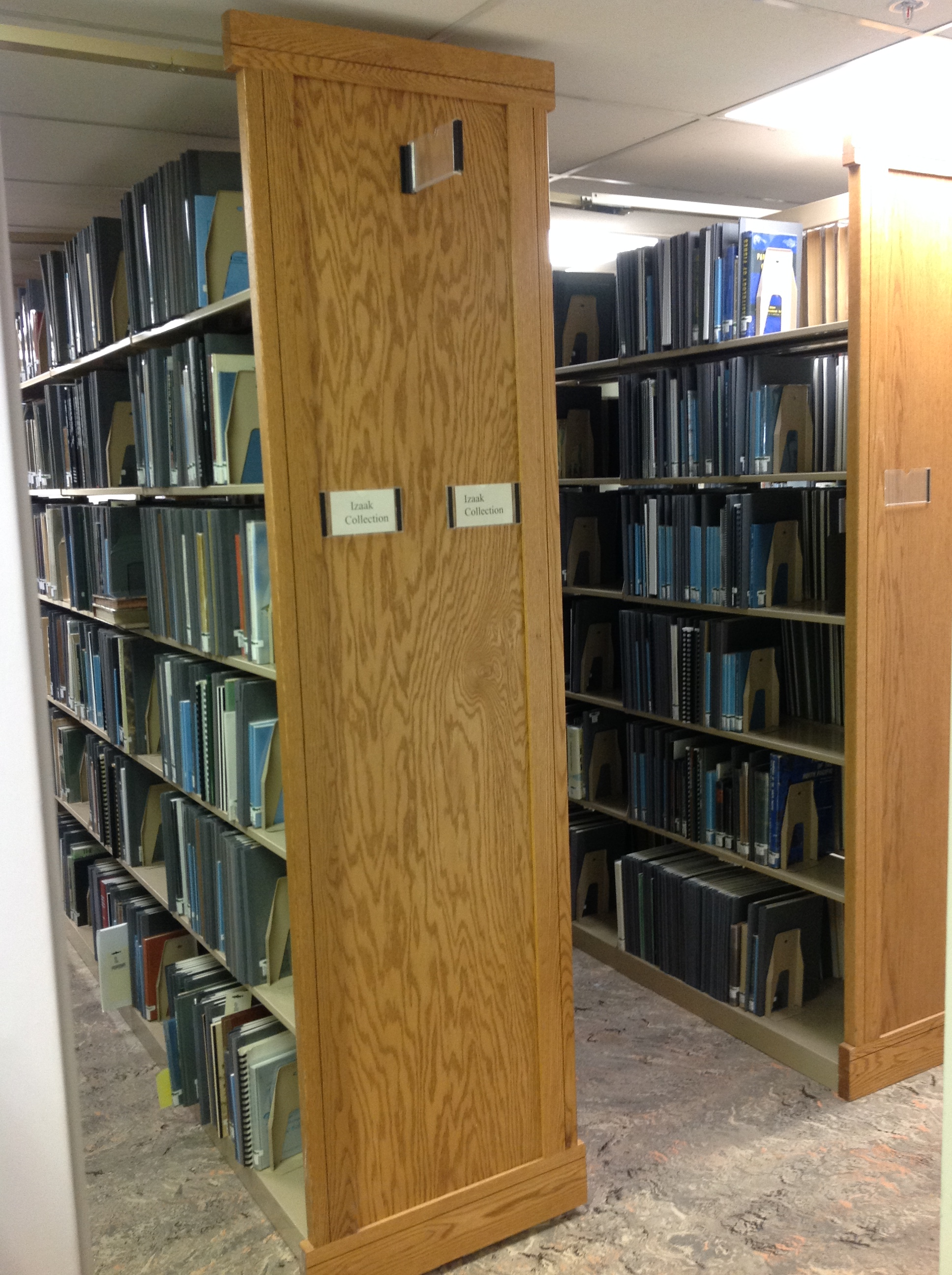
Stacks at the Trout and Salmonid Collection

In 1999, then Dean of the Montana State University Library, Bruce Morton, and local angling legend Bud Lilly conceived the idea of forming a world-class collection of literature on trout and salmonids. Bud Lilly, a 1949 alumnus of the university, stated he "would like to see students and others broaden their perspective of trout beyond the 'how-to' and 'where-to-go' angling books that publishing houses started spawning in the 1960s".Montana State University, because of its historic fisheries science program and proximity to hundreds of miles of blue ribbon fisheries, is often referred to as "Trout U." Lilly, through his connections with the angling industry, organized an initial donation of over 10,000 volumes from an anonymous collector in Montana. From this donation, an initial collection of over 4,000 titles was established. Through the work of special collections librarian James Thull and Montana State University Library Scholar in Residence Paul Schullery, the collection grew to over 10,000 volumes by 2011. As of 2023 the collection holds over 20,000 volumes and more than thirty archival collections.

== Description and scope ==
The collection is organized and cataloged according to the Library of Congress Classification system. The collection holds a broad array of works encompassing biology, ecology, angling, politics, economics, music scores, and the culinary arts; spiritual, literary and philosophical works; books, periodicals, government publications, and scientific reports; diaries, theses and dissertations. The collection is not considered a "rare book" collection but rather a focused research collection. Although the collection does contain originals of rare titles, it also contains many reprints. The collection has been built through donations and purchases from a variety of book sources as desirable titles become available. Government documents related to trout and salmonids are often purchased as well as requested from government agencies when they will benefit the collection.

=== Archives ===
The collection also comprises the personal papers of many luminaries and influential authors, artists, scientists and angling industry insiders associated with trout and salmonids. These archives include:

- Tom McGuane (1939- ) papers 1960s-2010; McGuane is an American writer known for fiction, nonfiction, and screenplays. His non-fiction predominantly focuses on his life outdoors and his interests in fly fishing, bird hunting, bird dogs, and raising horses.
- Robert J. Behnke (1929-2013) papers 1857-2000: Behnke was a fisheries biologist and conservationist and was recognized as a world authority on the classification of salmonid fishes.
- Nick Lyons (1932- ) ephemera collection (corporate records and personal papers 1932-2005): Lyons is an author and publisher of numerous important works on angling by Lyons Press.
- Charles E. Brooks (1921-1986) papers 1921-2002: Brooks was a retired U.S. Air Force officer who became a prominent author on fly fishing in Yellowstone National Park and the Madison River.
- Datus C. Proper (1964-2003) papers 1964-2003: Proper was a career Foreign Service Officer who retired to the Gallatin Valley and became a prominent angling author in the fly fishing press.
- Norman Strung (1941-1991) literary manuscripts and correspondence, 1966-1982: Strung was a 1963 graduate of Montana State University who established himself as a prolific outdoor writer for Field and Stream and author of 15 books on hunting and fishing.
- Alfred T. Pellicane (1949-2001) papers 1962-2000: Pellicane was a New York fly angler who collected angling literature. He drafted but never published a bibliography, entitled Profiles in Angling Literature.
- Harry B. Mitchell (1933- ) papers 1953-1965
- Louis Agassiz (1807-1873) letters 1854-1858
- Sylvester Nemes (1922-2011) papers 1973-2010: Nemes was a WWII Air Corps veteran, author and angler who published numerous seminal works on the history and use of Soft Hackle Flies.
- George F. Grant (1906-1908) papers 1973-1985: Grant was an angler, author and conservationist from Butte, Montana. He was active for many years on the Big Hole River.
- Bud Lilly (1925-2017) papers 1926-2008: Lilly was an angler, former fly shop owner, fishing guide, author and conservationist.
- The Stuart E. Knapp collection on Salmon Poisoning, 1923-1999.

== Books ==
The collection contains both old and rare works on the topic of trout and salmonids as well as important seminal works on all aspects of the topic.

- Giovio, Paolo (1531). Pavli Iovii Comensis medici De romanis piscibus libellus ad Ludouicum Borbonium cardinalem amplissimum. Rome: Basileae in officina Frobeniana.
  - This is the oldest book in the collection. Roughly 12 other libraries in the world hold this volume; six in the US (including two copies held by Harvard), three in France and three in Germany. It is thought to be the first book to ever mention, although it is in passing, fish or fishing in the New World.
- Bachman, J.C. (1988). Fly fishing for trout just off the interstate in Montana. St Paul, MN: Self-published.
  - A rare little self-published book meant for people passing through the state who want to drop a line in the water on a quick stop. Deals with fishing access points along the interstate and includes hand-drawn maps, directions, species, etc. Likely the rarest book in the collection as according to WorldCat it is only held by two libraries.
- Nelson, William (1753). The laws concerning game : of hunting, hawking, fishing and fowling, &c. and of forests, chases, parks, warrens, deer, doves, dove-cotes, conies ... together with the forest laws. London: Henry Lintot.
  - One of the earliest treatises published on fish and game laws and one of the more prominent of the period in terms of details and forward thinking. The collection also include works on US fish and game laws published as early as 1777.
- A Trout and Salmonid Artwork Collection, which holds images of sample artwork found in the MSU Trout and Salmonid Collection.

== Access and use ==
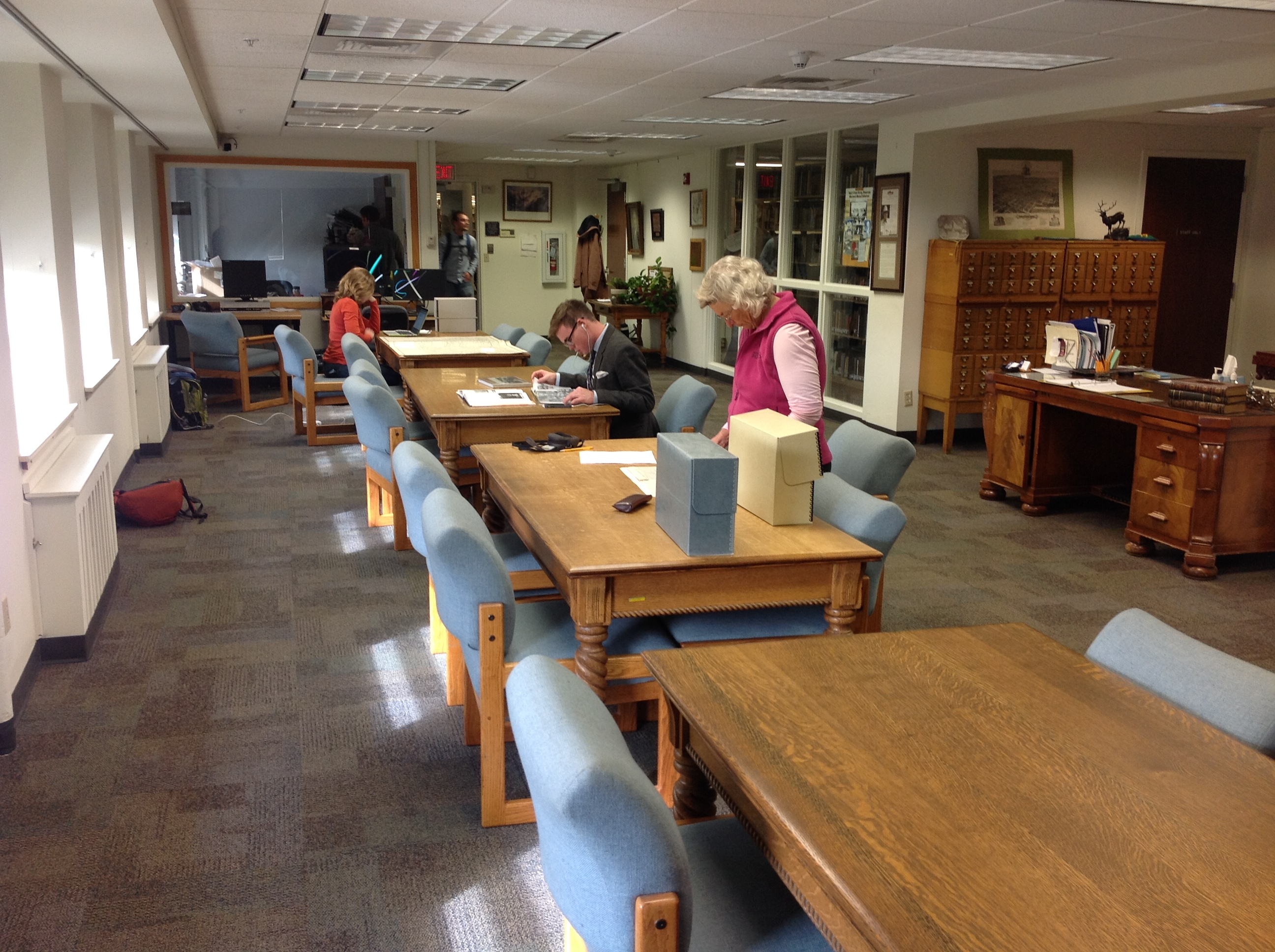
Reading room, Merrill G. Burlingame Special Collections Library

The Merrill G. Burlingame Special Collections is open to the public. Archivists and student workers assist researchers in finding materials and using them in this reading room. The Trout and Salmonid collection is in closed stacks and is not accessible via regular or inter-library loans. The collection is searchable via the Montana State University Library online catalog system, as well as Archives West.

== Related initiatives ==
- Bud Lilly Trout and Salmonid Initiative
  - The initiative represents a series of endowments designed to:
    - Help build the world's most dynamic collection of books, grey literature, and manuscripts devoted to trout and salmonids.
    - Fund an annual lecture series for speakers renowned for their contributions to topics on the histories of trout and salmonid species, angling, fisheries management, ecology, literature, anthropology, business and economics, and politics.
    - Build a faculty endowment to sustain the development and management of the Trout and Salmonid Collection and work with other MSU faculty, researchers, students, and members of the general public, coordinating acquisitions of books for the collection, special collections reference work, attending trout–related conferences and creating worldwide websites to connect interested groups to MSU resources.
- Angling Oral History Project.
  - The project collects, preserves, and disseminates histories, stories and opinions of anglers, authors, artists, politicians and outfitters.
- Trout and Salmonid Lecture Series. Every year since 2011 the MSU Library has hosted a Trout and Salmonid Lecture Series featuring speakers from various sections of angling and preservation.
  - 2011, video uploaded on April 24, 2017: “Trout and Fly, Work and Play, in Medieval Europe,” by Dr. Richard Hoffman.
  - January 26, 2012: “Fly-fishing the 41st Parallel and Other Travels in Search of Native Trout of the World," by James Prosek, an author, artist, and fly-fisherman.
  - April 22, 2013: “Where are we as stewards of great trout rivers and lakes?” by Nathaniel Reed, environmentalist and former assistant secretary of the interior for fish, wildlife and national parks.
  - March 5, 2014: “Native Fish Conservation in Yellowstone National Park,” by Dan Wenk, past superintendent of Yellowstone National Park.
  - April 23, 2015: “Saving the World: One Trout at a Time,” by Chris Wood, president and CEO of Trout Unlimited.
  - May 5, 2016: “Does Fishing Mean Anything?” by Thomas McGuane, angling enthusiast and award-winning author.
  - March 30, 2017: “How Healthy are the World’s Rivers?” by Jeremy Wade, an extreme angler, writer, and the host of Animal Planet’s River Monsters.
  - April 3, 2018: “Wild Trout in Montana” by Martha Williams, current director of United States Fish and Wildlife Service and past Montana Fish, Wildlife, and Parks Director.
  - April 2, 2019: “The Sensual Fish,” by Henry Hughes, poet and professor at Western Oregon University.
  - The lectures for 2020-2021 were cancelled due to the COVID-19 pandemic.
  - September 22, 2022: “The waters belong to everyone: the Montana stream access case,” by Jim Goetz, a Bozeman, Montana attorney who was instrumental in passing the Montana Stream Access Law.
  - September 14, 2023: “The History of Western Fly Fishing in Five Flies,” by Dr. Jen Brown, an environmental historian, author, and Associate Professor of History at Texas A&M University- Corpus Christi.

== See also ==
- Bibliography of fly fishing
