= Datus =

Datus may refer to:

- Datu (plural), a title for rulers of some Indigenous peoples of the Philippine archipelago
- Datus (Greece), an ancient Greek city in Macedonia

== People ==
- Datus (bishop of Ravenna), or Dathus (fl. 2nd century)
- Augustinus Datus, or Agostino Dati (1420–1478), Italian orator, historian, philosopher, and grammarian
- Jay Datus (1914–1974), American artist
- Lucius Valerius Datus (fl. 3rd century), Roman eques and Prefect of Egypt 216–217
- Datus Ensign Coon (1831–1893), American newspaper publisher
- Datus Ensign Myers (1879–1960), American artist
- Datus C. Proper (1934–2003), American political analyst, fly fisherman, and writer
