= George F. Grant =

American author and conservationist (1906–2008)

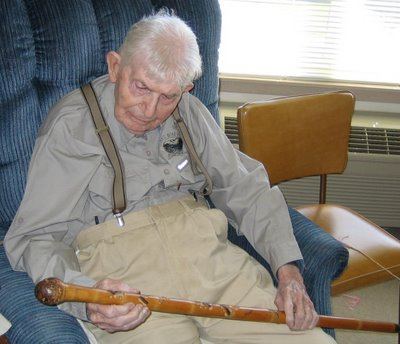
- Grant in 2006
- Born: September 18, 1906
- Died: November 2, 2008 (aged 102)
- Occupation: Fly tying
- Known for: Big Hole River conservation, Woven flies

George F. Grant (September 18, 1906 – November 2, 2008) was an American angler, author and conservationist from Butte, Montana. He was active for many years on the Big Hole River.

== Biography ==
George F. Grant began an innovative style of fly tying in the early 1930s and patented a unique method in 1939 (U.S. Patent No. 2,178.031). Grant uses a similar but different technique to Francis Potts' for weaving hackles. Grant was one of the first anglers to realize that large trout primarily consumed nymphs below the surface and that if one wanted to consistently catch large trout, they needed to imitate and learn to fish this insect-stage. Grant's nymphs imitated primarily large stoneflies such as the giant salmonfly (Pteronarcys californicus), which grows up to two inches in length. In 1973, the Federation of Fly Fishers awarded Grant the Buz Buszek Memorial Award-an award plaque presented annually to that person who has made significant contributions to the arts of fly tying.

In 1947, Grant married Annabell Thomson, and opened his own tackle shop that same year. Grant's Fly Shop was in operation until 1951. Shortly after closing his shop, he began working for Treasure State Sporting Goods. Throughout those years, Grant and his wife Annabell enjoyed spending time wading the Big Hole River, Grant proud that his "dyed in the wool tomboy" wife could fly cast like a pro.

In 1967 Grant retired, lived summers on the Big Hole River, fished nearly every day, and began writing. Grant also edited the newsletter River Rat for Montana Trout Unlimited, writing many of the articles himself. He also wrote many essays published in local newspapers.

In addition to Grant's conservation work on the Big Hole, he campaigned in the mid-1970s for the cleanup of the Clark Fork River which was heavily polluted by the Anaconda Copper Mining Corporation's mining and smelting activities in the Butte-Anaconda region.

This was long before the creation of the Superfund Law and during a time when the Clark Fork River was largely devoid of aquatic life for 120 miles from its headwaters near Butte to its confluence with the Blackfoot River, near Missoula.

Grant fished primarily the Big Hole River of southwest Montana, near his hometown of Butte. His dedication to this river led him to become an active conservationist. Grant led an effort to defeat the Bureau of Reclamation's proposed "Reichle Dam" from 1965 to 1967. Grant's leadership involved the national organization Trout Unlimited in its first major conservation battle. Today, the 150-mile long Big Hole River is one of America's last free-flowing rivers.

While George is most noted for his fly tying and conservation efforts - one of his greatest contributions was supporting his sister, Marcella Pitts, and raising his nephew, Francis C. Johnson. Fran opened Fran Johnson's Sport Shop in Butte Montana in 1965, and operated it until his death in 1985. George, Marcella, Fran, and his younger brother Howie, lived on the Big Hole River near Dewey during the Depression. George and Fran also operated a small Fly and Tackle shop named Trout Shop, located in West Yellowstone, in the years following WWII.

Grant established the River Rat Chapter of Trout Unlimited in 1972. His political leadership through this group and Montana Trout Unlimited led to passage of the Montana Streambed Protection Act in 1975. Grant also helped promote early efforts to insure anglers public access to streams and rivers, which in 1985 culminated in the Montana Stream Access Law. This local () Montana Trout Unlimited group is now called the George Grant Chapter.

In 1988 Grant established the Big Hole Foundation to focus conservation efforts on the river he had saved through his earlier conservation activities. Grant funded the organization's start-up through the sale of his split cane rod collection, his angling book collection, and through donations solicited from a nationwide cohort of supporters.

Grant's contributions were recognized in a public television film documentary made by the Montana Department of Fish, Wildlife and Parks titled Three Men, Three Rivers in 1988. This video is a source for instructors in the Boy Scouts of America () Fly Fishing Merit Badge.

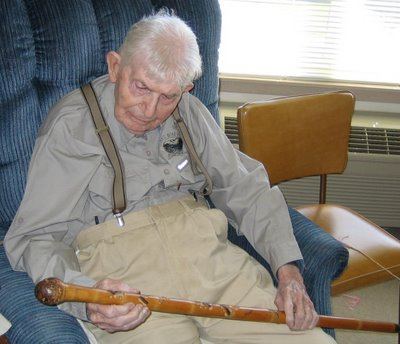
George Grant on his 100th Birthday, September 2006

== Works ==
Grant authored two books:

- Master Fly Weaver (1971); special edition reprinted in 1981.
- Montana Trout Flies (1972); special edition reprinted in 1981.

A collection of Grant's newspaper essays was published as Grant's Riffle (1997).

Grant's personal papers from 1973 to 1985 are held by the Trout & Salmonid Collection at Montana State University in the Merrill G. Burlingame Special Collections Library, Montana State University Library, Bozeman, Montana.

== Sources ==
- Pat Munday, George Grant and the Conservation of the Big Hole River Watershed Montana: The Magazine of Western History (Summer 2002): 20–37.
- George F. Grant, ed., The Upper Clark Fork River, a special edition of the River Rat (July/August 1976).
- Bill Rooney review of Three Men, Three Rivers in American Forests (September/October 1994).
- Wilkinson, Todd (2001). "Keeping Their Rivers: George Grant, Dan Bailey, Bud Lilly". In Wetmore, Jeff; Jones, Allen Morris (eds.). Flylines-The Best of Big Sky Journal Fishing. Bozeman, Mt: Bangtail Press. ISBN 0-9653336-5-5.
- Valla, Mike (2013). "George F. Grant (1906-2008)". The Founding Flies-43 American Masters Their Patterns and Influences. Mechanicsburg, PA: Stackpole Books. pp. 210–216. ISBN 9780811708333.
- Grant, George (Spring 1981). "Montana Odyessy" (PDF). The American Fly Fisher. 8 (2). Manchester, VT: American Museum of Fly Fishing: 24–27. Archived from the original (PDF) on 2014-11-29.
- Grant, George (Summer 1981). "Bunyan Bugs" (PDF). The American Fly Fisher. 8 (3). Manchester, VT: American Museum of Fly Fishing: 12–14. Archived from the original (PDF) on 2014-11-29.
