= Steve Strong =

Steve Strong may refer to:

- Stephen Cepello, American artist and former wrestler who competed in Hawaii
- Steve DiSalvo, American wrestler who competed for the World Wrestling Council and had short stints in WCW and the WWF
- Benoît Brisefer, a Belgian comics character named Steven Strong in English publications
