= Harriette Cushman =

American poultry specialist (1890-1978)

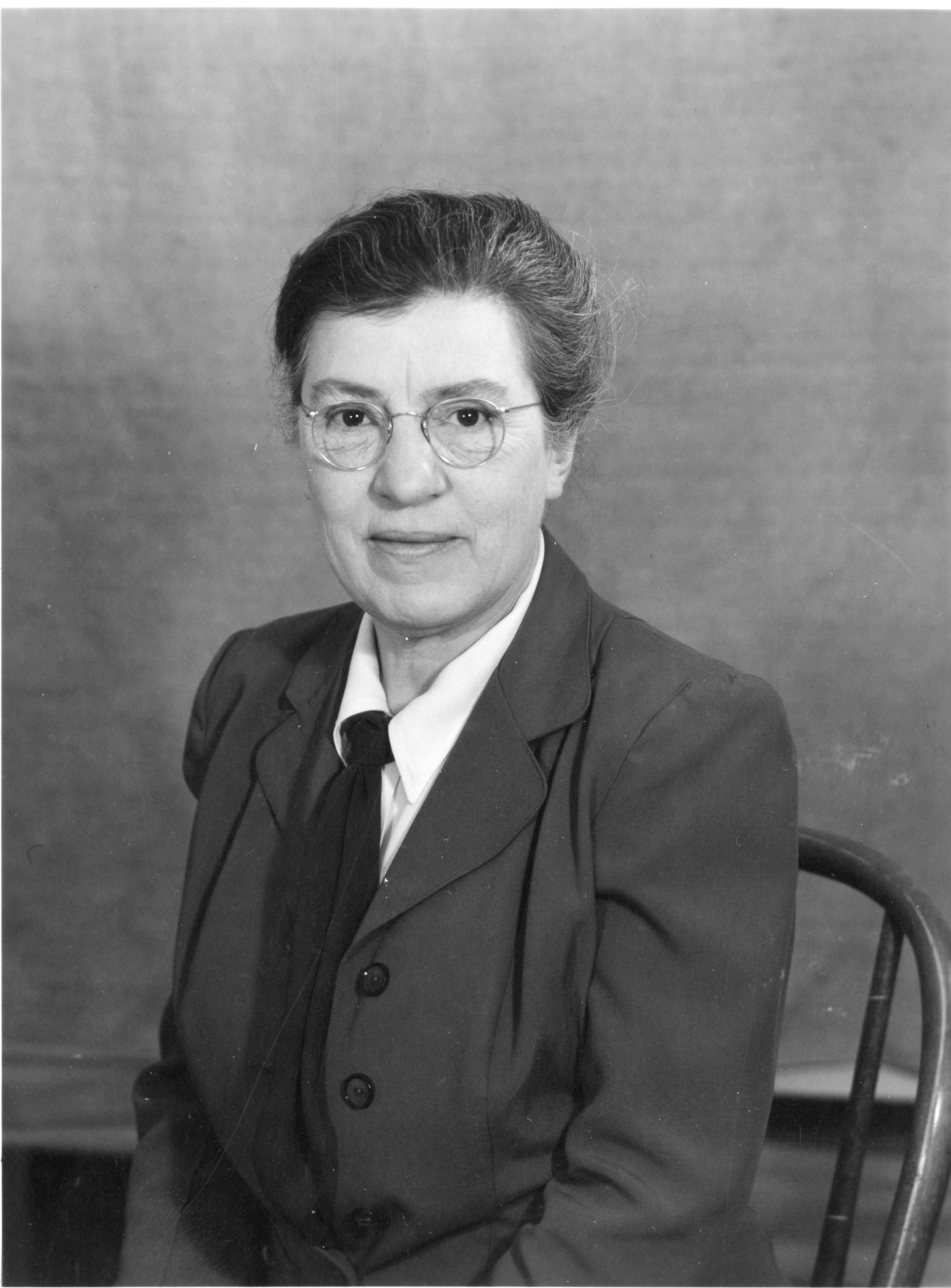
- Cushman, c. 1940s
- Born: Harriette Eliza Cushman; December 6, 1890; Birmingham, Alabama
- Died: 1978 (aged 87–88); Bozeman, Montana
- Education: Cornell University, B.S. (1914) Rutgers University, Poultry Specialist degree (1918)
- Occupation: Poultry specialist
- Employer: Extension Service
- Known for: First female Extension Service poultry specialist in the United States

Harriette Eliza Cushman (1890–1978) was the first female Extension Service poultry specialist in the United States, a lifelong supporter of the arts, an environmental advocate, and an honorary member of the Blackfoot tribe.

== Early life ==
Harriette Cushman was born in Birmingham, Alabama, on December 6, 1890. She grew up in New York and eventually earned a degree in Chemistry and Bacteriology from Cornell University in 1914. In 1918, Cushman earned a poultry specialist degree from Rutgers University and began pursuing a career as a poultry specialist.

== Poultry career in Montana ==
Cushman was hired as the poultry specialist by the Extension Service at Montana State College (now Montana State University) in 1922, where she worked until her retirement in 1955. Upon arriving in Montana, Cushman contacted county agricultural agents, home demonstration agents, and poultry raisers in their farm homes and “enough problems were unearthed to keep one busy for a lifetime". Harriette discovered that poultry production in Montana suffered from poor production, management, and marketing. As the poultry specialist, Cushman traveled the state instructing growers on how to improve the quantity and quality of their flocks and eggs. Cushman also created the cooperative marketing pools that helped drive poultry production in Montana and massively improved marketing efforts, particularly for eggs, in the state. These wholesale cooperatives of the 1920s were the first of their kind in the nation and helped Montana Montana poultry growers negotiate premium prices. Cushman's efforts to improve poultry production protected the industry in Montana during the Great Depression and kept it profitable despite the economic downturn.

Cushman also introduced poultry production into 4-H clubs in Montana. Finally, Cushman promoted and spread flock production on Indian reservations. Through raising poultry, she aimed to decrease the poverty and lack of economic opportunity that she saw in these areas.

Much of Cushman's contribution to the poultry industry focused on education. She wanted to instruct Montana farmers and the general public on how to better raise poultry as well as the positive qualities of Montana eggs themselves. To wit, Cushman organized egg shows in 1923, 1924, 1925, and 1926 to promote raising high-quality eggs and market them to the public. She also devised methods of consumer education during the 1930s, including grading demonstrations, 4-H demonstrations, cooking schools, and leaflets and pamphlets. Cushman also assisted farmers across the state with poultry techniques and new technological knowledge.

== Personal life ==
While Cushman enjoyed her job as a poultry specialist, she was also passionate about writing. She wrote hundreds of poems over the course of her lifetime that covered subjects from chickens to Christmas. Cushman also focused on the success of Indian students at Montana State College. Her work with the Blackfeet Nation and other Indian tribes in Montana meant that she was invested in education and assistance for Indian students. In 1969, Cushman sent out invitations to her future funeral and asked her friends to donate to the Indian Center instead of spending money on mourning. She also willed her estate to Montana State University to provide funds to the Indian Center and a scholarship fund for outstanding American Indian students.

== Awards and recognition ==
Cushman received many awards, both during her life and posthumously. In 1954, she was named a fellow of the Montana Institute for the Arts. In 1959, she was inducted into 4-H honorary society Mu Beta Beta. In 1969, Cushman received the Epsilon Sigma Phi “Ruby Award” for distinguished service from the Cooperative Extension Service. In 1963, Montana State College awarded Cushman an honorary doctorate of Doctor of Agriculture. In 1973, she received the Blue and Gold award for “her lifetime service to Montana."

== Later years ==
Following her retirement in 1955, Cushman worked to promote Native education and fought for environmental awareness and protection. She lobbied against strip mining for coal in eastern Montana in 1973, just five years before she died in 1978. She also composed poetry and supported the arts in Montana. She donated her papers to Montana State University, which are now held by Special Collections and Archival Informatics at the Montana State University Library.

== Publications ==
- Halcrow, Harold G., and Harriette Eliza Cushman. Guides to Poultry Profits in Montana. Bulletin (Montana Agricultural Experiment Station); 443. Bozeman, Mont.: Montana State College, Agricultural Experiment Station, 1947.
