= Glen, Montana =

Unincorporated community in Montana, United States

- Census-Designated Place
- Interactive map of Glen, Montana
- Coordinates: 45°28′44″N 112°41′31″W
- Country: United States
- State: Montana
- County: Beaverhead

Area
  - Total: 0.29 sq mi (0.75 km^{2})
  - Land: 0.29 sq mi (0.75 km^{2})
  - Water: 0 sq mi (0.00 km^{2})
- Elevation: 4,987 ft (1,520 m)

Population (2020)
  - Total: 28
  - Density: 96.2/sq mi (37.14/km^{2})
- FIPS code: 30-31375
- GNIS feature ID: 2804252

Glen is a census-designated place in Beaverhead County, Montana, United States. As of the 2020 census, Glen had a population of 28. Glen has a post office with a ZIP code of 59732.

Glen started out in 1878 as Willis Station, named for Ozias Willis, the first postmaster. The name was shortened to Willis, then became Reichle, and finally became Glen in about 1950.

Glen lies on U.S. Route 91, south of Melrose and north of Dillon. The Big Hole River runs past the east side of the town. Built in 1915, Browne's Bridge near town is listed on the National Register of Historic Places and provides a fishing access area. The river is renowned as a fly fishing destination. Brownes Lake is also nearby and provides a boat ramp and camping.

== Demographics ==
Historical population
Census	Pop.	Note	%±
2020	28		—
U.S. Decennial Census

== Education ==
Glen provides elementary education at Reichle Elementary. High school is at Beaverhead County High School.
