= Acoustic Atlas =

Western US natural sounds archive

- Commercial?: No
- Type of project: Audio archive
- Location: Montana State University Library, United States
- Key people: Jeff Rice; Kenning Arlitsch; Doralyn Rossmann; Steve Hunts; Jim Espeland
- Established: February 1, 2013
- Website: acousticatlas.org

Acoustic Atlas is a repository of sound recordings from the Western United States, including sounds made by animals, ambient recordings of environments, and interviews related to the topic of natural sounds. The collection is hosted by the Montana State University Library, and it is a collaboration between the library and Yellowstone National Park. The project focuses on the collection and dissemination of natural sounds of Montana and the Greater Yellowstone Ecosystem, along with habitats and species from throughout the contiguous Western United States.

== Purpose and scope ==
The Acoustic Atlas was founded in 2013 by Montana State University Library to create an audio archive to document regional ecosystems and biodiversity amid the impact of growing human populations in the Intermountain West region of the United States. The collection also includes Hawaii. The archive includes more than 3000 online audio recordings of a range of animal sounds and environmental soundscapes. Sounds in the collection are provided by recordists who are contractors, volunteers, researchers, and federal agencies such as the National Park Service. All recordings are available to the public; many sounds are available for download and in the public domain.

The mission of the Acoustic Atlas is to archive rare and under-represented recordings of species and environments and "to document natural soundscapes that are increasingly impeded by human activity and development."

== Types of recordings ==
The Acoustic Atlas includes relatively short recordings of sounds made by wildlife; longer ambient soundscapes that capture the collective sounds of natural environments; and interviews with scientists and other experts on subjects related to natural sounds. These recordings are organized into categories based on taxonomic class, features of the environment (including water, weather, and geology), or dynamic chemical processes such as fire or photosynthesis. Human-sourced sounds are included when they occur incidentally in environmental recordings and are typically classified as anthropogenic noise.

The collected and organized recordings of animal calls, such as deer and birds, can show differences in "dialects" between populations in different regions. Some of the interviews discuss the practice of making recordings of wildlife, such as a recordist talking about holding ants in his teeth to get a recording of their sounds.

Some sounds are recorded in places of specific historic significance, such as the Trinity site at White Sands Missile Range in New Mexico.

=== Sub-collections ===
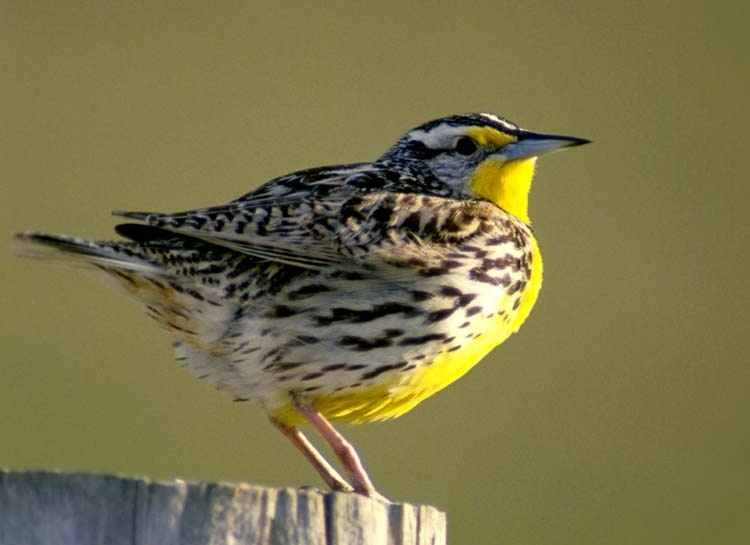
The Ivan Doig collection includes the call of a western meadowlark.

The archive's sub-collections include the sounds of terrestrial vertebrate species, species and soundscapes of Yellowstone National Park, and recordings from the grassland ecosystems of Montana. Since 2017, the archive has been developing a collection of ambisonic recordings made at locations within Montana and other Western states.

The Soundscapes of Ivan Doig includes soundscape recordings and interviews from the lands and peoples featured in some of the American author's 16 novels. This sub-collection includes the Wind from Eden Podcast and The History of Weather in Doig Country.

=== Yellowstone National Park ===
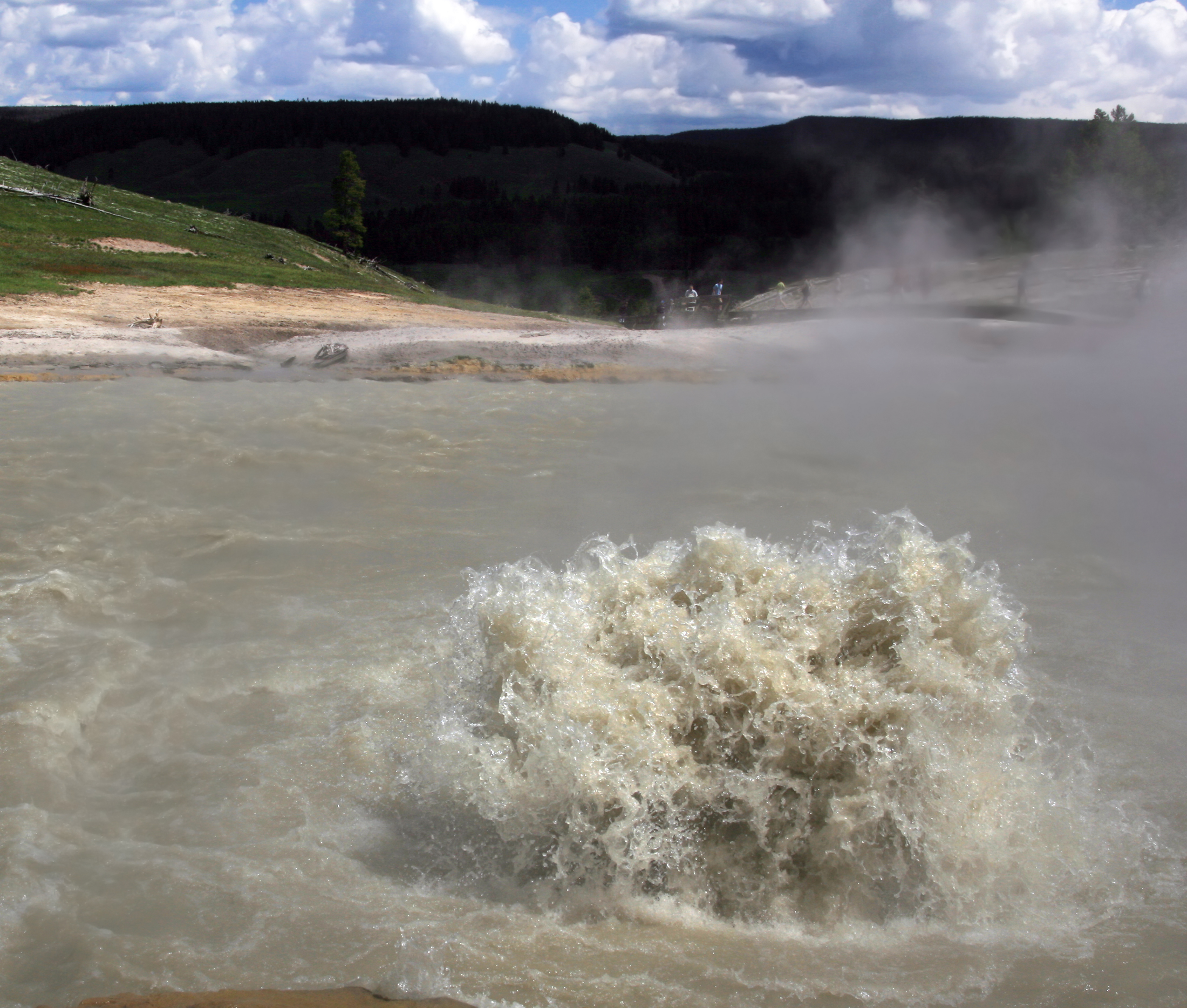
The Yellowstone Sound Library has samples of the sounds of geothermal areas boiling.

In 2013, the Acoustic Atlas began collaborating with Yellowstone National Park to record and archive sounds from the park. This collaboration supports the creation of new field recordings, along with a podcast series that was jointly produced by Yellowstone National Park and the Acoustic Atlas from 2017 to 2019. Audio producer Jennifer Jerrett recorded many of the sounds in this collection, both natural and human. The project was partly funded by the Yellowstone Association and Yellowstone Park Foundation.

== Uses ==
In 2018, the mapping software company Esri worked with the Acoustic Atlas to develop the ArcGIS StoryMap "Sounds of the Wild West: An audio tour of Montana's four major ecosystems." The Esri team incorporated both GIS data and sound in this platform.

Sounds from the archive have been used in the film Walking Out (2017), an exhibit at the Natural History Museum of Utah in 2019–2020, radio programs on WBUR and Montana Public Radio, and a New York Times Magazine multimedia exhibit about sounds around the world.

Many of the sounds are also available for independent producers and song composers to use.
