= This House of Sky =

1978 book by Ivan Doig

This House of Sky: Landscapes of a Western Mind
- Author: Ivan Doig
- Published: 1978
- Website: web.archive.org/web/20230223215328/https://www.ivandoig.com/houses.html

This House of Sky: Landscapes of a Western Mind is a 1978 nonfiction book by Ivan Doig. A memoir of the author's early life in Montana, it was a finalist for the National Book Award. It was Doig's first book, written in Seattle and followed by several fiction and nonfiction books. The memoir was based on interviews with his father and others, as well as archival research at the University of Washington. It was listed #4 the top 100 Western nonfiction books by the San Francisco Chronicle.
