= Ivan Doig =

American writer

Ivan Clark Doig
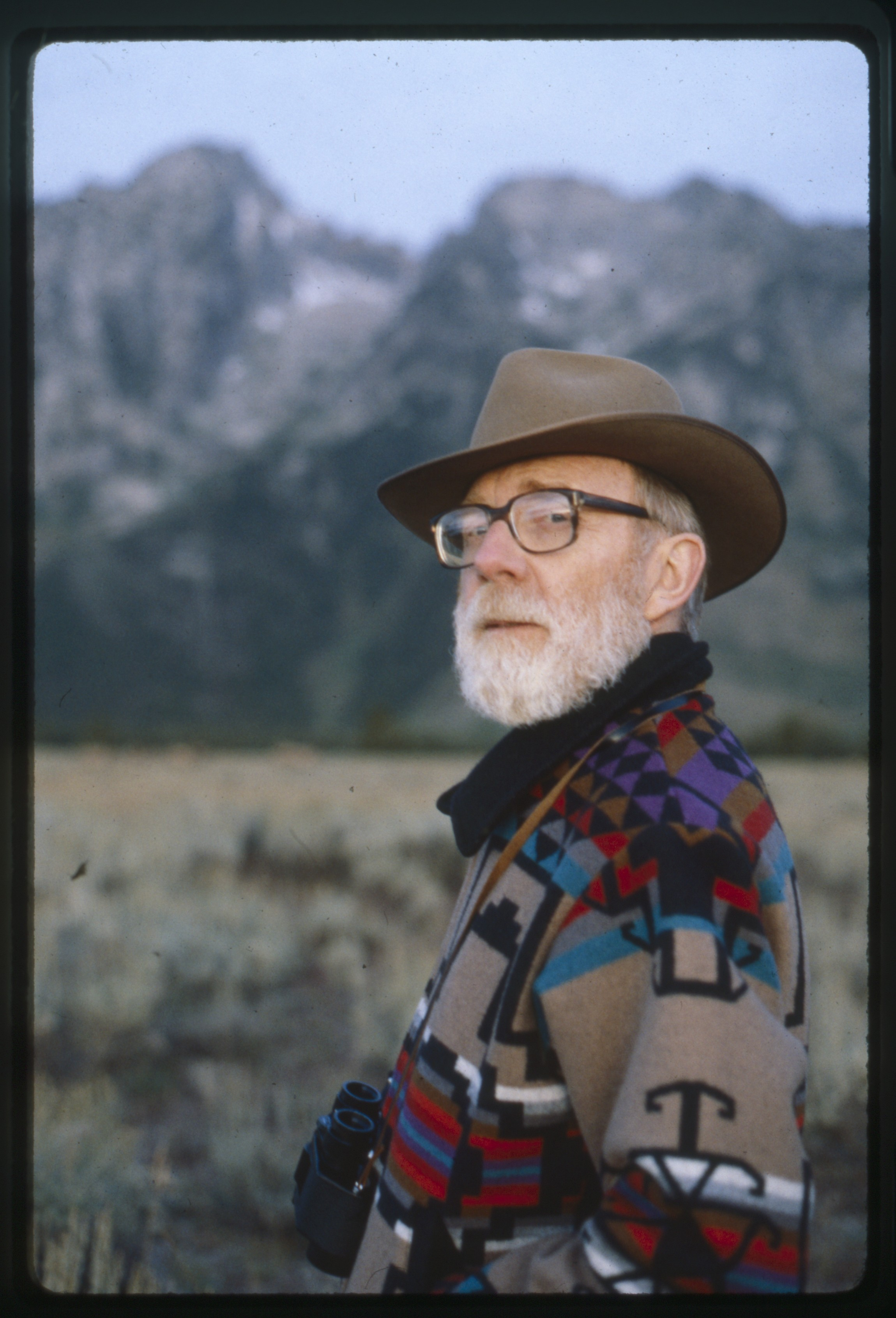
- Teton range, Wyoming - Closeup of Ivan Doig at base of mountains (Photo by Carol Doig)
- Born: June 27, 1939; White Sulphur Springs, Montana, U.S.
- Died: April 9, 2015 (aged 75); Seattle, Washington, U.S.
- Education: Northwestern University; University of Washington (PhD)
- Occupations: Author; journalist; novelist
- Spouse: Carol Muller Doig

Signature
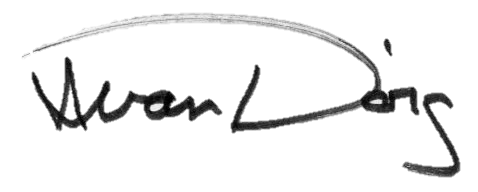

Ivan Doig (/ˈaɪvən ˈdɔɪɡ/; June 27, 1939 – April 9, 2015) was an American author and novelist, widely known for his sixteen fiction and non-fiction books set mostly in his native Montana, celebrating the landscape and people of the post-war American West.

With settings ranging from the Rocky Mountain Front to Alaska's coast, Puget Sound and Oregon, the Chicago Tribune noted in 1987 that Doig wrote of "immigrant families, dedicated schoolteachers, miners, fur trappers, town builders" and of "the uncertainties of friendship and love, and colossal battles of will, set amid the vast unpredictabilities of a land noted for sudden deadly floods, agonizing droughts, blizzards and forest fires." Doig himself would later say "I come from the lariat proletariat, the working-class point of view." In particular, Doig "believed that ordinary people deserve to have their stories told". This House of Sky: Landscapes of a Western Mind, Doig's 1977 memoir, was finalist for the National Book Award for Contemporary Thought. In 2007 Doig won the University of Colorado's Center of the American West's Wallace Stegner Award. Doig's 2006 novel The Whistling Season became a New York Times best-seller. He won the Western Literature Association's lifetime Distinguished Achievement award and held the distinction of the only living author with works of both fiction and non-fiction listed in the top 12 of the San Francisco Chronicle poll of best books of the 20th century. Doig's life and his works are the focus of the documentary film by Montana PBS and 4:08 productions, Ivan Doig: Landscapes of a Western Mind.

In 2006, Sven Birkerts described Doig as "a presiding figure in the literature of the American West."

I don't think of myself as a 'Western' writer". To me, language—the substance on the page, that poetry under the prose—is the ultimate 'region,' the true home, for a writer.
If I have any creed that I wish you as readers, necessary accomplices in this flirtatious ceremony of writing and reading, will take with you from my pages, it'd be this belief of mine that writers of caliber can ground their work in specific land and lingo and yet be writing of that larger country: life.

— Ivan Doig

== Early life ==
Doig was born in White Sulphur Springs, Montana to Charles "Charlie" Doig, ranch hand and Berneta Ringer Doig. After the death of his mother on his sixth birthday, he was raised briefly (1947 - 1949) by his father and his father's second wife, Fern White, who had been hired as a ranch cook, and later by his father and his maternal grandmother, Elizabeth "Bessie" Ringer. Doig moved with his father and grandmother on a series of jobs, the ranch equivalent of sharecropping, subsequently moving to Dupuyer, Montana to herd sheep close to the Rocky Mountain Front. As a child, Doig read comics, sports pages and magazines like Life, Colliers and The Saturday Evening Post.

Doig graduated salutatorian in a class of 21 students from Valier High School in Valier, Montana. He won a full-tuition scholarship to Northwestern University, where he earned a bachelor's degree in 1961 and a master's degree in journalism in 1962. His master's thesis was on the subject of televised congressional hearings on organized crime. He later earned a Ph.D. in American history at the University of Washington, writing his dissertation on John J. McGilvra (1827–1903).

Important first-hand influences on his writing included his high school English and Latin teacher, Frances Tidyman; Sam Jamison, who taught him reporting at Northwestern; and Ben Baldwin, who taught him broadcast news.

After he earned his degree in 1962, Doig was drafted into the Air Force Reserve. He was released from active duty in 1963. Doig lived with his wife Carol Doig, née Muller, a university professor of English, in Seattle, Washington until his death from multiple myeloma in 2015.

He was related to Fully Informed Jury Association co-founder, Don Doig.

== Career in writing ==
Before becoming a novelist, Doig wrote for newspapers and magazines as a free-lancer and worked for the United States Forest Service. Doig served as an editorial writer for the Lindsay-Schaub newspaper chain in Decatur, Illinois, and served as assistant editor of The Rotarian magazine in Evanston, Illinois.

The western landscape and people play an important role in Doig's fiction, with much of it set in the Montana country of his youth. His major theme is family life in the past, mixing personal memory and regional history. The first three Montana novels—English Creek, Dancing at the Rascal Fair, and Ride with Me, Mariah Montana—form the "McCaskill trilogy", covering the first century of Montana statehood from 1889 to 1989.

== Personal life ==
Ivan met his future wife, Carol Muller, at the Medill School of Journalism at Northwestern University while the two were students. They married on April 17, 1965. The two did not have any children. Carol assisted Ivan in writing and editing his books and was a longtime professor of journalism.

== Later years ==
In 2001, Ivan was diagnosed with MGUS (monoclonal gammopathy of unknown significance). In 2006, he was diagnosed with “smoldering myeloma,” which can remain dormant for years. In November, doctors told Ivan that his high levels of proteins meant that his myeloma was progressing. Ivan kept a detailed record of his medical journey in journals now held by Montana State University in the Ivan Doig archive. He died from multiple myeloma on April 9, 2015.

== Ivan Doig Archive ==
In October 2015, Carol Doig donated her husband's extensive holding of notes, photos and records of his writing to the Montana State University Library Merrill G. Burlingame Special Collections. Montana State University was chosen over offers from Stanford University and the University of Washington based in part on the promise of the MSU Library to digitize the entire collection in less than one year, as well as on MSU's proximity to Doig's childhood home and the encouragement of Montana authors Rick Bass, Tom McGuane and Jamie Ford.

The Ivan Doig digital collection consists of manuscripts, proofs and galleys, typed and handwritten writing fragments, pocket notebooks, note cards, diaries, journals, photographs, audio/visual material, and memorabilia created or collected by Ivan Doig. The physical collection is preserved within Montana State University Library's Merrill G. Burlingame Special Collections. The digital collection is available online.

This library includes a collaboration with Acoustic Atlas, Soundscapes of Ivan Doig, with recordings and interviews from the lands and peoples featured in his novels.

== Bibliography ==
=== Novels ===
- The Sea Runners (1982)
- English Creek (1984) (Note: Briefly reviewed in the January 21, 1985 issue of The New Yorker, pp.93-94.)
- Dancing at the Rascal Fair (1987)
- Ride with Me, Mariah Montana (1990)
- Bucking the Sun (1996)
- Mountain Time (1999)
- Prairie Nocturne (2003)
- The Whistling Season (2006)
- The Eleventh Man (2008)
- Work Song (2010)
- The Bartender's Tale (2012)
- Sweet Thunder (2013)
- Last Bus to Wisdom (2015)

=== Nonfiction ===
- News: A Consumer's Guide (1972) - a media textbook co-authored by Carol Doig
- This House of Sky: Landscapes of a Western Mind (1978) - memoirs based on the author's life with his father and grandmother (nominated for the National Book Award)
- Winter Brothers: A Season at the Edge of America (1980) - an essayistic dialog with James G. Swan
- Heart Earth (1993) - memoirs based on his mother's letters to her brother Wally

=== Edited volumes ===
- Streets We Have Come Down: Literature of the City (1975)
- Utopian America: Dreams and Realities (1976)

———————

Bibliography notes

== Awards ==
- Finalist, National Book Award, This House of Sky (1979)
- Christopher Award, This House of Sky (1979)
- Pacific Northwest Booksellers Award for Literary Excellence – 1979, 1981,1983, 1985, 1988, 1994, 2007
- Doctor of Letters, Montana State University (1984)
- National Endowment for the Arts fellowship (1985)
- Western Heritage Award, Best Western Novel, English Creek (1985)
- Doctor of Letters, Lewis and Clark College (1987)
- Western Literature Association's Distinguished Achievement Award (1989)
- Evans Biography Award Heart Earth (1993)
- Mountains & Plains Booksellers Association (MPBA) 'Spirit of the West' award (1997)
- Pacific Northwest Writers Association Achievement Award (2002)
- Center of the American West's Wallace Stegner Award (2007)
- One Read book Whistling Season for Daniel Boone Regional Library, Missouri (2008)
- Willamette Writers' Lifetime Achievement Award (2014)
