= Montana State University Library =

American academic library

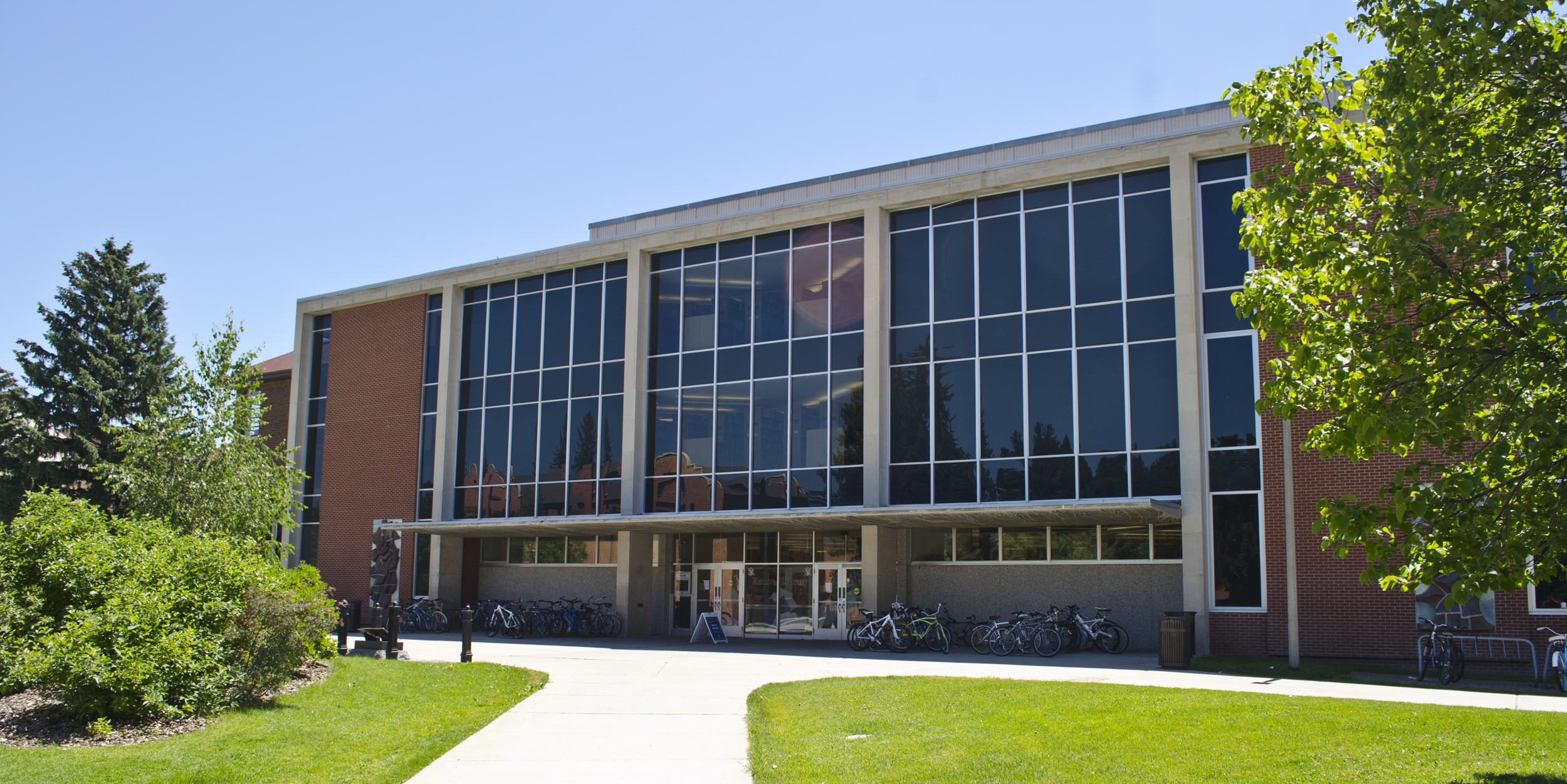
- 45°40′00″N 111°02′55″W
- Location: Bozeman, Montana, US
- Type: Academic library
- Established: January 1894

Collection
- Items collected: Books 523,937; E-Books 230,104; Gov Docs 114,000; Microforms-Audio-Video 2,210,828; Serial Subscription 15,615; Archives 3,651 ft (1,113 m) linear

Other information
- Budget: $9,307,161 FY 2022
- Director: Doralyn Rossmann
- Employees: 50
- Website: www.lib.montana.edu

The Montana State University Library (MSU Library) is the academic library of Montana State University, Montana's land-grant university, in Bozeman, Montana, United States. It is the flagship library for all of the Montana State University System's campuses. In 1978, the library was named the Roland R. Renne Library to honor the sixth president of the university. The library supports the research and information needs of Montana's students, faculty, and the Montana Extension Service.

== History ==
In January 1894, about seven months after Montana College of Agriculture and Mechanic Arts was founded, the college began acquiring and housing a formal library collection for its students and faculty research use. For the first two years of the library's existence, students or instructors served part-time to provide library services. In 1896, Mabel Ruth Owens became the first full-time professional librarian to oversee the library's operations and collection development. In 1927, the library was moved to the second floor of Montana Hall.

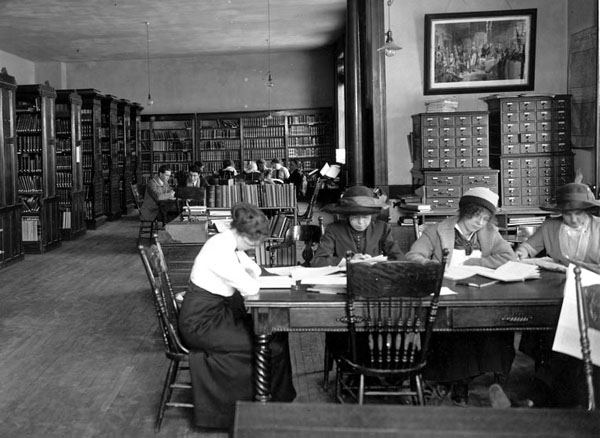
Library in 1904

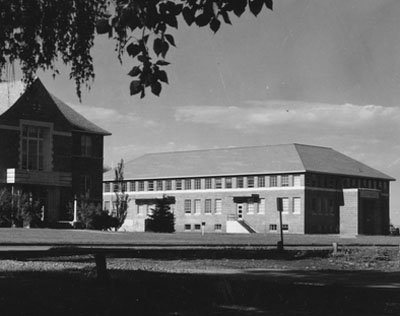
Library in 1950

In 1949, the library, its collection and research services were moved to a newly constructed 8,894 sq ft (826.3 m^{2}) library facility. After the transfer of nearly 100,000 volumes from various locations around campus the library officially opened its doors on January 9, 1950.

Shortly thereafter, the then University Librarian Lesley M. Heathcote described the new facility as "not especially inspiring to look at" and embarked on expanding both the library building and its collections. In August 1960, construction began on a new 125,000 square foot addition adjacent to the west side of the 1950 building. The basement and first floor of the new addition were opened on January 3, 1962 and the entire four-story new addition was completed for occupancy in November 1966. On October 14, 1978, the Montana State University library was officially named for Roland R. Renne, the university's sixth president. The Montana State University Renne Library Building is 112,000 square feet in size and has a seating capacity of 1,100 and a total staffing of 74 part-time and full-time employees.

In 2002, a significant three-year remodeling and seismic bracing were completed. The remodel included providing additional individual and group student study space, adding a new coffee bar and installing MSU alumnus Rudy Autio's ceramic sculpture Kosmos. A remodeling in 2011 transformed the entire first floor into an Information Commons. The newly reconfigured first floor opened up the area and added: movable furniture, multiple computer stations, portable classroom equipment, module group study rooms, increased power supply access for mobile devices, an expanded Writing Center, and Library Commons Technical Support staff to assist students and faculty with technical expertise. The Commons was designed and implemented to meet the needs of academic research faculty and students in the collaborative 21st-century information technology environment.

The library has over 100 computers, many scanners and printers for walk-in use, and flexible module setting, tables and configurable group-study work areas. Laptops, handhelds and digital cameras are available for student checkout and there are numerous power-stations available for recharging handheld devices. Included in the Library Commons along with the Brewed Awakening Coffee Bar and Writing Center, are Browse and Reading Areas of current issues of magazines, daily newspapers, new book acquisitions and two sections of recommended books, one by university faculty and the other by library staff.

The Montana State University (MSU) Library website gives students, faculty and the Montana community online access to Ask A Librarian online chat, the library catalog, digital collections, reserves, interlibrary loan, student group-room reservations, and online retrieval of e-books and academic journals.

== Collections ==
Montana State University Library's collections include: books, e-books, digital media, multimedia, government documents, special collections, university archives, microform, and electronic and print academic, literary, and scientific journals and magazines.

=== Digital collections ===
There are several types of digital collections at Montana State University Library. One type includes collections held within the library's Archives and Special Collections that have been digitized for both online patron access and archival purposes. Collections currently available include the Thomas Brook photographs, the Ivan Doig papers, Montana State University photographs, Montana Works Progress Administration records, early Montana Extension Service Bulletins, Frank Craighead Grizzly Materials, and John Heminway papers.

A second type of digital collection includes those that are unique born-digital and reformatted digitally scanned print research materials focused on a Montana State University's degree program such as the Department of Earth Sciences' Advanced Snow Science Degree in partnership with International Snow Science Workshop (ISSW), American Avalanche Association and Canadian Avalanche Center.

A third type of digital collection includes those collections culminating from a partnership grant to develop and distribute online research materials to faculty, students and the regional public. Examples of academic scholarly partnerships include the Range Science Information System (RSIS), an academic scholarly partnership project between Montana State University Library, the University of Idaho, and the University of Wyoming, and the Indian Peoples of the Northern Great Plains Digital Collection, which was a partnership grant from the Institute of Museum and Library Services (IMLS) with Little Big Horn College Library, MSU-Northern Library, MSU-Bozeman Library, MSU-Billings Library, and the Museum of the Rockies.

The library is home to the Acoustic Atlas, a browsable collection of habitat and species sounds from throughout the Western United States. The Acoustic Atlas includes the Yellowstone Collection, a curated compilation of field recordings as well as a podcast series highlighting America's first national park. The audio collection offers a freely-accessible online archive of natural sounds, interviews and radio stories focused on the Greater Yellowstone Ecosystem.

=== ScholarWorks ===
ScholarWorks is an open access institutional repository developed and maintained by the MSU Library for the collection, storage and online retrieval of Montana State University's intellectual work and scholarly output focused on Montana State University's mission of teaching, original research and community education initiatives.

=== Archives and Special Collections ===
The Merrill G. Burlingame Special Collections contains primary sources that include original manuscript materials, historical documents, and photographs covering collections on the Greater Yellowstone Ecosystem; Native American People of Montana and the Great Plains region; Montana and western United States agriculture, ranching, engineering and architecture; the Trout and Salmonid collection, and regional writers. Access to the Merrill G. Burlingame Special Collections is through the Burton K. Wheeler Reading Room.

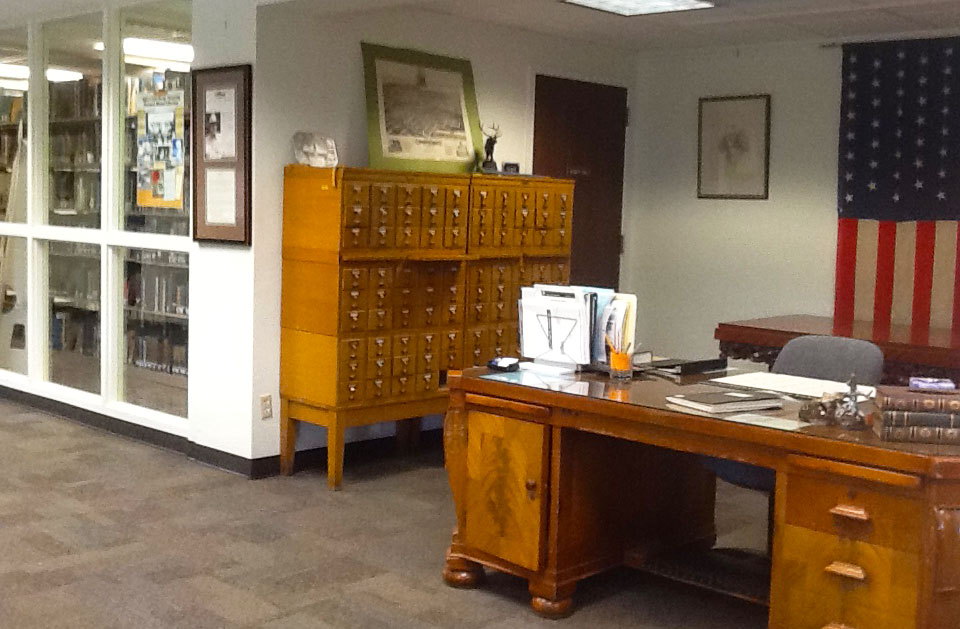
The Burton K. Wheeler Reading Room

- Ivan Doig papers: Manuscripts, proofs and galleys, typed and handwritten writing fragments, pocket notebooks, note cards, diaries, journals, photographs, audio/visual material, and memorabilia created or collected by Ivan Doig. The entire collection is also available online.
- Greater Yellowstone Ecosystem: Diaries, log books, correspondence, military records, scientific research, scrapbooks, stereographs and photographs created by early park employees and visitors from Yellowstone National Park's inception in 1872 through the late 20th century. Examples of individual collections include:
  - Gallatin National Forest Ranger Log Books, 1906–1967
  - Yellowstone Park Company Records
  - Frank Jay Haynes Family Papers
  - Lt. Gustavus C. Doane's 2nd U.S. Cavalry historical exploration journals of 1870 and 1876
  - Frank Craighead papers on grizzly research in the GYC
- Trout and Salmonid Collection: Over 11,000 books, periodicals and grey literature with ephemera and research materials including:
  - Bud Lilly Papers, 1926–2008
  - Dr. Robert J. Behnke Research Papers
- Prominent Montanans: Correspondence, professional and personal papers, publications, photographs, literary manuscripts, military papers, diaries, journals, gubernatorial, senatorial and congressional papers. Examples of individual collections include:
  - Senator Burton K. Wheeler Papers, 1922–1975
  - F. Jay Haynes Photographs
  - Roland Roger Renne Gubernatorial Campaign Papers, 1963–1966
  - Merrill G. Burlingame Papers, 1880-1980
- Native Americans: Correspondence, photographs, reservation records, telegrams, treaties, allotment plats, hearing papers, diaries and Indian Claims Commission research papers. Examples of individual collections include:
  - Crow Agency 1876–1877 Fraud Hearings and 1928 Reservation Plats
  - Fort Peck Indian Reservation Boarding School Student Roster, 1888–1892
  - Verne Dusenberry Papers, 1927–1966
  - James Willard Schultz Papers and Photographs
- Montana Agriculture, Ranching, Engineering & Architecture: Ranch business records, personal papers, ranching and farming organizations' records, photographs, scrapbooks, diaries and range science research materials of Montana ranchers, farmers, agricultural industry professionals and agricultural scientists starting from the 1870s through end of the 20th century. Examples of individual collections include:
  - August "Gus" Hormay Papers, 1900–1999
  - Strode Family – Stirrup Ranch, 1896–1969
  - Castle Mountain Cattle and Sheep Company, 1877–1971
  - 2,800 individual drawing sets and personal papers of architects' projects starting from 1828 through 1980
- University Collections: Contains manuscript, records, artifacts, and photographs of Montana State University.

== Budget ==
The fiscal year 2020 total budget for Montana State University Library is $9,051,839. Included in that total are materials expenditures of $5,770,550 and personnel expenditures of $3,085,448. The Montana State University Archival collection total is 3,651 linear feet.

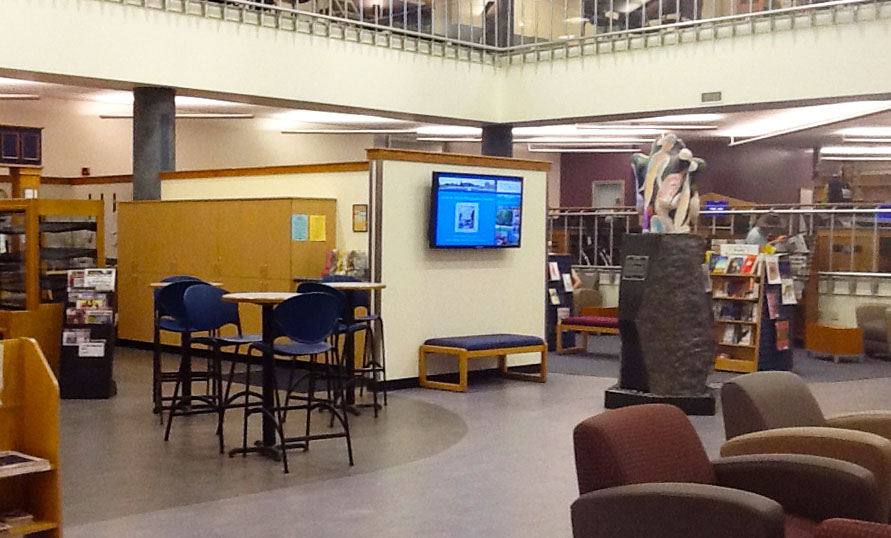
Library first floor and Brewed Awakening coffee Shop

== Special events ==
Montana State University Library's hosted special events include:

- Tribal College Librarians Institute (TCLI).
- Paws to De-stress Program
- In 2018 Montana State University Library hosted the international Open Repositories Conference.

== Awards ==
- 2003 Montana Library of the Year award from the Montana Library Association
- 21st place on the 100 Most Social Media Friendly College & University Libraries for 2013

== Memberships ==
Academic and research library memberships for Montana State University Library include:

- Archives West
- Association of College and Research Libraries
- Coalition for Networked Information
- Council on Library and Information Resources
- Digital Library Federation
- Dryad (repository)
- DuraSpace
- HathiTrust
- Lyrasis
- Minitex
- NISO
- OCLC Research Library Partnership
- ORCID
- Scholarly Publishing and Academic Resources Coalition (SPARC)
