= Bucking the Sun =

1996 novel by Ivan Doig

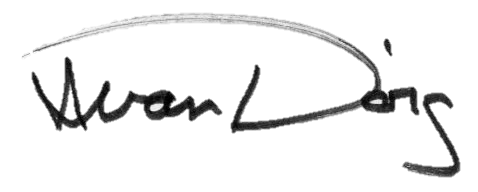

Bucking the Sun is a novel by American author Ivan Doig, published in 1996. It is the fourth book in Doig's Two Medicine Country series. The title refers to "working against the glare of sunrise or sunset".

== Plot ==
The Duff family are homesteaders who move from their alfalfa farm to work on the Fort Peck Dam, a New Deal project.

== Reception ==
Timothy Foote of The New York Times described the novel as "a neat, excruciating Agatha Christie country-house murder set down in sprawling Montana." Kirkus Reviews gave the book a mixed review: "The Duffs are believable but not memorable; Steinbeck this writer is not. Doig's real achievement is to chronicle—with empathy and precise, lyrical authority, down to the last load of gravel hauled in a sturdy Ford truck—the magnificent Fort Peck project and the desperate times out of which it arose."
