= Stephen Cepello =

American artist, professional wrestler

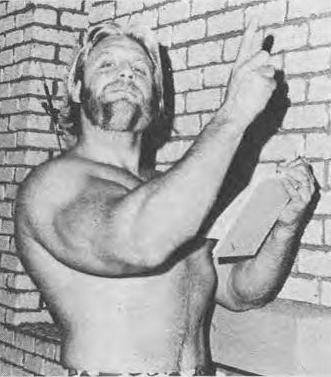
- Cepello, circa 1978

Personal information
- Born: Stephen Cepello; June 29, 1949 (age 77) Arizona, United States

Professional wrestling career
- Ring name: Steve Strong
- Billed height: 6 ft 4 in (193 cm)
- Billed weight: 282 lb (128 kg)
- Billed from: California
- Trained by: Mac McFarland
- Debut: 1973
- Retired: 1980

Stephen Cepello (born June 29, 1949) is an American artist and former professional wrestler. As a wrestler, he was best known by his ring name, "The California Terminator" Steve Strong. After retiring from wrestling to focus on his art career, he was selected to paint the official Governor's Mansion and Minnesota State Capitol portraits of former wrestler and Governor of Minnesota Jesse Ventura.

== Early life ==
Cepello was raised in Arizona, where he began painting at age seven. He attended the Kachina School of Art in Phoenix. He attended college in Phoenix and played on the basketball team, earning an induction to the school's athletic hall of fame.

== Professional wrestling career ==
Strong began wrestling in 1973, competing for Stu Hart's Stampede Wrestling promotion. Much of his career was spent in Hawaii. He competed for NWA Hawaii as both a singles wrestler and as a member of several tag teams. Several championships had been inactive due to the promotion itself being inactive from July 1974 until June 1977, and the promotion held tournaments to determine the new champions when the titles were revived in July 1977. Strong competed for the NWA Hawaii Heavyweight Championship and advanced to the final round of the tournament before losing to Bill Francis. He also made it to the final round of a tournament for the NWA Hawaii Tag Team Championship along with partner Steve Lawler but ultimately lost to Sam Steamboat and Billy White Wolf. Strong was then paired with Jesse Ventura, as the promoter thought that their similar heights and muscular physiques made them a good match. On July 28, Strong teamed with Ventura to win the tag team championship. They held the belts until November, when they dropped them to John Tolos and Bill Francis. In January 1978, Strong gained momentum in his rivalry with Francis, defeating him for the NWA Hawaii Heavyweight Championship and, with partner Chris Markoff, for the NWA Hawaii Tag Team Championship as well. Strong lost the heavyweight title to Tolos the following month but held the tag team belts until Bill and Russ Francis won the championship on April 26 that year. On June 14, Strong teamed with former rival Tolos to win the belts for the final time. They defeated Big John Studd and Buddy Rose and held the title for two months before dropping it to Mr. Fuji and Karl Von Steiger on August 16.

== Art career ==
Cepello appeared in the music video for Michael Nesmith's "Cruisin'", which was included in the 1981 collection titled Elephant Parts. Nesmith mistakenly stated in 1989 that Hulk Hogan played the role, but he corrected his statement in 2003. He has also appeared in several movies. In 1981, he played Ivory King in Tarzan, The Ape Man. That year, he also had a role in Looker, which was directed by Michael Crichton. In 1985, Strong appeared in Grunt! The Wrestling Movie, portraying a character known as The Mask.

Cepello has painted two portraits of former tag team partner and Governor of Minnesota Jesse Ventura. One, which was painted for the Governor's Mansion, shows Ventura riding a horse while holding an American flag. The other, a portrait of Ventura resting his hand on Musée Rodin's The Thinker, is displayed in the Minnesota State Capitol. The latter picture has been the subject of scrutiny, as Cepello stated before the unveiling that it would contain a reference to Ventura's wrestling career. Some viewers have stated that they see the letters WWF, a reference to the World Wrestling Federation, hidden in the folds of Ventura's sleeve, while others believe that Ventura's tie contains a hidden face.

He has also done commercial artwork, which has including the logo for Dave Draper's Bomber Blend whey protein. While living in Hawaii, he also painted and sold seascape paintings. Cepello, whose work has included many portraits of animals, is also active in working to preserve marine wildlife.

== Championships and accomplishments ==
- 50th State Big Time Wrestling
  - NWA Hawaii Heavyweight Championship (1 time)
  - NWA Hawaii Tag Team Championship (3 times) – with Jesse Ventura (1 time), Chris Markoff (1 time), and John Tolos (1 time)
