= Jay Datus =

American painter

Jay Datus (March 24, 1914 –1974) was an American artist known primarily for his mural painting in Arizona.

== Early life ==
Jay Datus was born Jesse Datus Smith, Jr., in Jackson, Michigan, to Jesse Datus Smith and Marguerite Wood Smith. The family moved about, living gpt a short time in Chicago and eventually moving to Worcester, MA, the home of his mother. Datus attended Sever Street Preparatory School and Classical High School in Worcester. He graduated from Classical High and the Worcester (MA) Museum School of Fine Arts in 1931. He then attended Yale School of Fine Arts from 1931 to 1934, studying with Eugene Savage. He briefly studied portraiture with Wyman Adams in New York and London. It is during this time that presumably Jesse, Jr. changed his name to Jay Datus for professional reasons (the 1930 census records list him as J. Datus so Jay Datus might have been a natural progression).

Datus moved back to Chicago in the mid-1930s where he opened his first studio. He did murals for private homes and some portraits. He participated in two exhibits at the Art Institute of Chicago in 1936 and 1937. He married Martha (Marty) Berry in 1936. She too was an artist, but specialized in landscapes.

=== The Mural at the Arizona State Library ===
At the age of 23, Datus won the honor to paint the murals in the Arizona State Library for a WPA project. Datus and his wife traveled to Arizona from Illinois where they remained for most of the two years it took to complete the project. Before beginning the actual painting, Datus spent extensive time studying the various subjects. For example, working closely with Mulford Winsor, the Arizona State Librarian at the time who had done some research on the topic, Datus carefully included Apache smoke signals in the smaller panels, but only after further consultation with other Apaches. He was extremely concerned that his paintings were accurate in every detail although he did take some liberties in combining some groups. Datus presented his research notes and descriptions of each panel to the State Library when he was done. These were to be the basis for a brochure about the mural, but they were never published. The September 1944 issue of Arizona Highways featured these murals.

Following the completion of the murals, Datus and Marty returned to Illinois. However, Marty died after a short illness October 15, 1940. He did have a one-man show at the O’Brien Galleries in Chicago for one week, November 26 – December 7, 1940, which included ten portraits and four cartoons for the Pageant of Arizona Progress mural. By mid January 1941, Datus finished work on some sketches for a proposed mural for the Illinois Bell Building in Chicago and asked Mulford Winsor for a letter of recommendation. Datus did not win that completion.

== World War II - 1947 ==
In March 1941, Datus joined the Cook County, IL National Guard (he had told Mulford Winsor that he had a rather low draft number and felt that he would be called up soon). Starting off as a private in the Army Field Artillery, by November, he was a corporal stationed at Camp Forrest, Tennessee. Again he asked Mulford Winsor for a recommendation for admission to Officers’ Training School (it had become a standing joke between the two that that was the primary reason Datus would write after leaving Arizona). Datus was successful and started OCS at Fort Sill, Oklahoma in February 1942, graduating in May 1942 as part of the 12th OCS class of that year. He was subsequently commissioned as a 2nd Lieutenant. It is unclear when he shipped out and with what unit. While serving in the South Pacific though, Datus briefly managed to draw portraits on scraps of paper or tent canvas.

When WWII ended, Datus returned to Chicago where he eventually married Edette Kable June 14, 1946, an employee in the paint store Datus frequented. During this time, Datus did do some commercial work, a set of twelve pictures, which were used on gas station and grocery store calendars for at least two years. Datus also adopted Edette's young daughter, Cynthia.

== Later years 1948 – 1974 ==
Datus apparently had never forgotten the beauty of Arizona. Thus, in 1948, he, his wife, and daughter returned to Arizona and settled permanently in Phoenix. On what is now the northeast corner of 30th Street and Clarendon, Datus established the Kachina School of Art and his home.

However, teaching was not Datus' only contribution to the art world of Phoenix and Arizona. He served on the Heard Museum Board of Directors from 1957 to 1959, was director of the Fine Arts displays at the Arizona State Fair, and worked diligently to develop the now Phoenix Art Museum being a board member of the Phoenix Fine Arts Association. In the 1950s and early 1960s, Datus painted portraits of many of the prominent people living in Phoenix. The State of Arizona commissioned him to do the portraits of the 1963 Speaker of the Arizona House: Wilber B. "Bill" Barkley, and the 1955-56 President of the Arizona Senate: Clarence Carpenter. He also painted other works, many of which were displayed in art shows throughout the valley. But these portraits and other small works merely provided the money to fund his true love: murals.

These murals predominately graced the walls of banks such as First National, First Federal Savings, Western Savings, and other commercial buildings in Arizona. His largest mural, Foundations of Confidence, was installed in the lobby of the First National Bank main branch (411 N. Central Ave, Phoenix, AZ). At the time, 1956, it was purported to be the largest mural in the southwest. Apparently a gentleman from the Midland (TX) Savings and Loan Association saw this mural and commissioned Datus to do one for their new building. That mural, Cowboys to Skyscrapers, was installed in mid 1959. However, its existence is not known. While the First National Bank building still exists, the mural was removed a number of years ago when the previous owner, Arizona Public Service, sold the building. That mural currently rests in the vault of the Arizona Museum of Natural History awaiting restoration as does the Kiva at Awatovi which formerly hung in the First Federal Savings building on 20th St. and Camelback. The Route of the Aviatrix which once hung in First National Bank's fly-in branch at Sky Harbor Airport now rests in a Wells Fargo Bank vault.

=== Kachina School of Art ===
The Kachina School of Art offered day and evening programs for adults and children for over 25 years. Courses and programs covered a wide range of medium and were taught by both Datus and other renowned local artists such as Paul Coze and Lotan Lotan. Over the years, the students of Jay Datus contributed to the art world of Phoenix and the country for he wrote almost a weekly art column ("The Paint Box") in the Arizona Republic for five years.

He instituted correspondence art courses in 1965/65. The intent was to provide the “same individual art instruction program that is taught in [the] resident school.” The books for these courses, Master Artists Training Course, took ten years to complete.

For a number of years, the Kachina School of Art held an annual ball, The Beaux Arts Ball which became one of the premier social events of spring in Phoenix. In July 1952, Datus addressed the Phoenix City Council and proposed that the funds raised at this event would be used to purchase art from the Arizona State Fair entries which would then be donated to the City of Phoenix Art Collection. These became known as the Kachina Civic Art Collection and hung in the Phoenix Civic Community Center (this pre-dates the Phoenix Art Museum). Today, this collection is part of the Phoenix Municipal Art Collection and owned by the City of Phoenix.

Datus had a summer studio near Heber, AZ, called the Buckskin Acres and Art Community which also offered courses. Datus died in October 1974. His wife and daughter continued to run the correspondence art courses for several more years.

==== A Sampling of Students of the Kachina School of Art ====
- Julie Frye
- Adin Shade
- Bill Lundquist
- Eleanor Brown Staley
- Michael DuVal Finnell (1947–1999)
- Karen Quam Russell
- Jay Kemp
- Carol Kemp
- Joyce Killebrew
- Stephen Cepello
- Drake Seaman (1935–2000)
- Dagne Hanson (1931–2014)
- Keith Steiger
- A. Ajamie AKA BB Wood (student, then instructor - online correspondence course, circa 1976)

== Notable works ==
=== Murals ===
Unfortunately, many of the buildings where Datus' murals were installed no longer exist so many of these works are either in storage or missing. Following the Savings and Loan scandals in the late 1980s, some works were auctioned by Resolution Trust in the early 1990s which further complicates tracking them down.

==== Murals in Situ ====
- "Pageant of Progress", Arizona State Library at 1700 W. Washington, Phoenix, AZ
- Children of the World Desert Schools Credit Union 10770 W Bell Rd, Sun City, AZ (formerly First Federal Savings)
- The Seven Golden Cities of Cibola Wells Fargo Bank at 150 N. Stone Ave, Tucson, AZ (formerly the Southern Arizona Bank & Trust Building) (1958–1960)
- Walnut Canyon Visitor Center (Arizona)

==== Murals no longer mounted, but original location cited ====
- The Smoki Dancers First National Bank Prescott, AZ (1956) [currently held by the Smoki Museum of American Indian Art & Culture]
- 900 AD (4 pieces ) Fashion Square, Scottsdale, AZ First Federal Savings & Loan
- Painting the Kiva Mural at Awatovi 20th St. & Camelback, Phoenix, First Federal Savings & Loan
- The Fishers & the Seagulls Financial Center, First Federal Savings & Loan, Phoenix
- Monument Valley Downtown Office, Western Savings & Loan, Phoenix
- The Quest of Coronado 82nd St. & McDowell, Scottsdale, AZ, First National Bank
- The Snow Geese Fly Free 5th St. & Mill Ave, Tempe, AZ, First National Bank
- Myth as Forgotten History The Wax Museum Scottsdale, AZ
- Foundations of Confidence Main Office, Phoenix, First National Bank
- Copper, Cattle & Cotton Main Branch, Tucson, AZ
- Cowboys to Skyscrapers First National Bank Midland Savings & Loan, TX

=== Portraits ===
- Clarence Carpenter, 1955–56, President of the Arizona Senate
- Wilber B. “Bill” Barkley, 1963, Speaker of the Arizona House
- Hubert O. Merryweather, 1953–54, President of the Arizona Senate
- Kathryn Gammage, wife of Grady Gammage, President of Arizona State University (mezzanine of Gammage Memorial Auditorium, Tempe, AZ)
- Dr. Glenn Frank, former president, University of Wisconsin-Madison (1941)
- Irving Maurer, president 1924–1942, Beloit College, Beloit, Wisconsin

H. Thomas Cain, Curator Heard Museum 42 years. Arizona State University professor of anthropology.

==== “Missing Portraits” ====
- The Matadors The Adams Hotel, Phoenix, Owned by a private party.
- Portraits of Pioneers Park Central branch, First National Bank, Phoenix
- The Zuni Water Carriers 18th St. & Camelback branch, First National Bank, Phoenix
- The Old West Christown Office, 5830 N. 19th Ave, Phoenix, First Federal Savings & Loan
- Indian Ceremonials Youngtown, AZ Office, First Federal Savings & Loan

== Bibliography ==
1. Collins, Mary. "Local Artist has Three-Way Success Story Going for Him." Arizona Republic, Mar. 8, 1964.
2. Datus, Jay. "On Art In Banks." Arizona Architect Oct. 1959. Vol 3:2, 8–9.
3. Datus, Jay. Master Artists Painting Course vol. 1 & 2. n.d.
4. Downey, Norma. Interview by Donna J. Reiner, Apr. 22, 2004.
5. Correspondence between Jay Datus and Mulford Winsor located in the Arizona State Archives.
6. "Former City Resident Paints Eight Murals For Arizona." Evening Gazette, (Worcester, MA), Mar. 11, 1939.
7. "Life of Artist's Wife Busy". Arizona Republic, June 16, 1962, F8.
8. "Muralist Jay Datus Dies: Founder of Kachina School." Arizona Republic, Oct. 29, 1974, C3.
9. Reiner, Donna J. "He Lost His Heart to Arizona." Under the Dome: A Newsletter from the Arizona State Capitol Museum. Summer, vol.3:3, 2000.
10. Reiner, Donna J. "Jay Datus." an unpublished biography.
11. The Murals in the First National Bank of Arizona's Head Office Building in Phoenix. First National Bank of Arizona, 1956.
12. "This Week Magazine." Arizona Republic, Jan. 30, 1966: 17.
13. "You Are Invited to View the Murals at the Southern Arizona Bank." Tucson Daily Citizen, May 21, 1960:3.
