= Pat Munday =

American environmentalist, writer

Pat Munday is an American environmentalist, writer, and college professor emeritus living in Butte, Montana. He was awarded the Liebig-Woehler Freundschaft Prize for scholarship in the history of chemistry, and contributions through environmental activism.

== Biography ==
Munday graduated from Drexel University in 1978 with a double BS in Engineering and Humanities. He went on to study at the Rensselaer Polytechnic Institute and graduated in 1981 with an MS in Science, Technology and Values. He received his Cornell University his MA in History in 1987. In 1987 and 1988 he was a visiting researcher and Fulbright Scholar at the Universität Hamburg, Institut für Geschichte der Naturwissenschaften, Mathematik und Technik. After that Munday went on to receive his PhD from Cornell in the History and Philosophy of Science and Technology in 1990, where his dissertation was titled Sturm und Dung: Justus von Liebig (1803-73) and the chemistry of agriculture.

=== Environmental activism ===
After graduating from Cornell Munday took a teaching position with Montana Tech of The University of Montana where he teaches courses on technology and society; professional ethics; the politics of technical decisions; and culture, technology & communication. He is a member of the Big Hole River Foundation and the George Grant chapter of Montana Trout Unlimited.

As President of the George Grant Chapter of Trout Unlimited, the group received more than $1 million in funding for a restoration & land acquisition project on German Gulch, a trout fishery near Butte.

He was a charter member and governor's appointee to Montana's Upper Clark Fork River Basin Remediation and Restoration Advisory Council from 1998–2002. The Council advises the Governor of Montana and works to promote public involvement, educational activities, and develop policy involving the State of Montana’s $215 million settlement for damages to natural resources caused by a century of mining and smelting activities. Munday helped establish the Council's newsletter and school resources, an effort that culminated in the establishment of the Clark Fork Watershed Education Program, hosted by Montana Tech of the University of Montana.

Munday delivered radio commentaries on KUFM (FM) for the Clark Fork River Technical Assistance Committee, an EPA Technical Advisory Committee for the Clark Fork River Superfund process.

He was the Big Hole River Foundation's representative in the Big Hole River Conflict Resolution Committee, a state-appointed committee to resolve recreational conflicts through deliberative dialogue and policy suggestions to the state. Following a collapse of the state-appointed committee, a group led by Munday created a plan that was accepted by the state; the Seven Day Rest-Rotation Rule aimed to minimize conflict between the angling public and outfitters and guides.

As the Big Hole River Foundation's interim Executive Director, the group received Resources for Community Collaboration/William & Flora Hewlett Foundation to inaugurate land use planning in the four counties governing land along the Big Hole River. This effort culminated in a four-county plan designed to better manage riverine habitat.

== Publications ==
Munday is the author of Montana's Last Best River: The Big Hole and its People. (Lyons Press, 2001, ISBN 978-1585743315), currently the only published work on this 2,800-square-mile (7,300 km^{2}) watershed. He published related articles including "George Grant and the Conservation of the Big Hole River Watershed".

Munday's earlier publications stemmed from his PhD thesis, "Sturm und Dung: Justus von Liebig (1803-73) and the Chemistry of Agriculture," completed under the direction of his Doktorvater Dr. L. Pearce Williams of Cornell University's Science & Technology Studies program. This early series of publications included "Social Climbing Through Chemistry: Justus von Liebig's Rise from the niederer Mittelstand to the Bildungsbuergertum, Ambix 37 (1990): 1-19 and "Politics by other means: Justus von Liebig and the German translation of John Stuart Mill's Logic", British Journal for the History of Science 31 (1998): 403-18. Munday's work on Liebig was cited heavily in the Liebig biography by University of Leicester professor William H. Brock, Justus von Liebig: The Chemical Gatekeeper (Cambridge University Press, 1997).

Munday's later publications were on a range of topics including a study of raven-human interspecies communication, an analysis of human vs. machine translation, a study of the historical cultural relationship between mining and earth mother goddesses, and a study of Hui Muslim culture in north-central China.

== Honors and awards ==
Munday's work on Liebig resulted in his being awarded the inaugural Liebig-Woehler Freundschaft Preis in 1994, which he shared with Dr. Emily Heuser.

In addition to Munday's Fulbright Award while a PhD candidate with Cornell, he received two additional Fulbright Awards as a senior faculty member with Montana Tech. The first was a 2012 Fulbright Scholar Aware to Southwest University in Chongqing, China, where he taught two graduate courses, delivered guest lectures at several other Chinese universities, and at the U.S. Consulate in Chengdu. The second was a 2017 Fulbright Scholar Award to Ningxia University in Yinchuan, China, where he taught two undergraduate courses, delivered guest lectures at several other Chinese universities, and at the U.S. Embassy in Beijing.
