= August Ludwig Hormay =

American ecologist

August Ludwig "Gus" Hormay (1980)
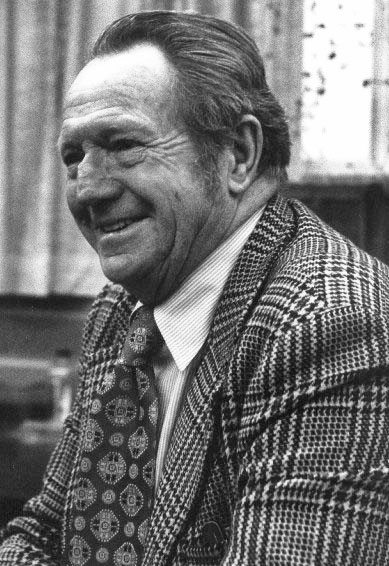
- Born: May 10, 1907; San Francisco, California
- Died: 1999; San Francisco, California
- Citizenship: United States
- Education: Bachelor of Science in Forestry (1930)
- Alma mater: University of California – Berkeley
- Occupation: Rangeland Management Scientist
- Employer(s): United States Forest Service (USFS) and Bureau of Land Management (BLM)
- Known for: Developing Rest-Rotation Grazing System
- Spouse: Anna Darida Hormay

August Ludwig Hormay (1907–1999) developed and applied the concept of the rest-rotation grazing management system in areas of the Western United States. Rest-rotation rangeland management system uses deferred grazing to manage increased plant reproduction and maintenance, while providing grazing lands for both livestock and wildlife. Gus Hormay's rest-rotation management system was developed to increase a healthy plant community, watershed, soil and wildlife habitat, while at the same time increasing livestock production. It has been in use in various forms since the mid-1960s as a rangeland management tool.

== Early life ==
August Ludwig Hormay was born Gustav Hormay on May 10, 1907, to a cabinet-maker father and homemaker mother in San Francisco, California. Gus Hormay grew up in a rural area just outside the city of San Francisco and spent much of his childhood around local truck farms and dairy farms and in the Sierra Nevada Mountains. He studied architecture and industrial arts in high school and graduated from Lick-Wilmerding School of Mechanical and Industrial Arts, 1921–24. Hormay became interested in forestry while attending college and went on the obtain a University of California Berkeley B.S. Forestry, 1926–1930.

While at University of California Berkeley, Hormay was appointed the Bidwell Fellow of Forestry 1930–1931 and started his laboratory and field research with bitterbrush (Purshia tridentata) that spanned the next fifty years.

== Professional career ==
Gus Hormay started working professionally in rangelands ecology in 1931 with the United States Forestry Service and in 1966 he expanded his rest-rotation work with the Bureau of Land Management. After his formal retirement in the 1980s, he continued his work in rangelands wildlife management as a consultant until his death in 1999. Gus Hormay worked as a range conservationist at the California Pacific South West Forest & Range Experiment Station, Forest Service USDA Berkeley, California from 1931 to 1966. In 1942, as part of his research, Hormay set-up several long-term experimental station research plots in Modoc, Lassen, and Plumas National Forests. While analyzing the data from his laboratory and field research with Bitterbrush (Purshia tridentata), he postulated his rest-rotation method and further developed a theory and practical application system for its use within multiple use rangelands management.

Hormay's rest-rotation grazing management system employed various combinations of year-long rest, deferment, early season grazing, and full season grazing in a 3- to 5-year cycle. In the early years of its research and development, it was often referred to as the Hormay Grazing System. Hormay first applied his theory to the Harvey Valley cattle allotment in California's Lassen National Forest in 1952. His work was nationally recognized in 1957 with a United States Department of Agriculture's Superior Service Award. After eight years of monitoring the system, he published the experimental results in 1961.

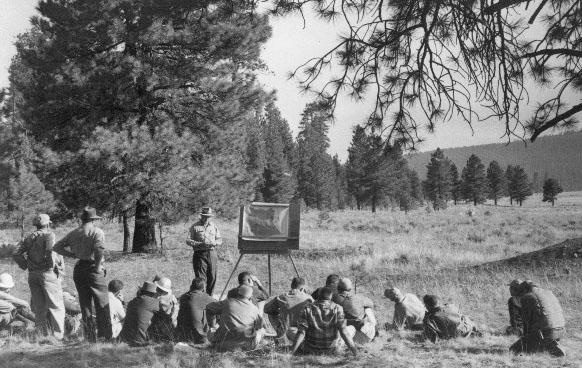
Hormay Teaching Rest Rotation in 1956

In 1966 Hormay started working for the United States Bureau of Land Management (BLM) to advise and train both BLM employees and independent livestock and land management owners how to implement and use the rest-rotation grazing system with multiple use lands. By 1974, BLM demonstration areas using rest-rotation within both federal and state agencies, ranchers and stockmen, various rangeland resource users and environmentalists, were involved with the training and outreach for multiple-use land management program and it was spread across the Intermountain West grazing allotments and rangelands.

During the years 1966–1977, he remained headquartered at California Pacific South West Forest and Range Experiment Station in Berkeley, California, continued his research work with Bitterbrush (Purshia tridentata) experiments, and wrote several scientific articles on the rest-rotation grazing system and how to apply it, including Principles of Rest-Rotation Grazing and Multiple-Use Land Management, September, 1970. In 1971 he was awarded the United States Department of the Interior's Distinguished Service Award and in 1972 Gus received the Society of Range Management’s Outstanding Achievement and Service Awards.

After his official retirement, Gus continued working as a Rangelands Management Consultant and worked on such projects as:

- Professional witness for the 1980 lawsuit of Hinsdale vs. BLM where the District of MT Billings found in favor of plaintiffs (Hinsdale).
- Range Management Consultant for the Aunt Molly Fishing Access Refuge, 1985–1986
- Designed and received the 1992 BLM Partners in Spirit Award with the rest-rotation grazing system with Ray Marxer, manager of the historic 250,000-acre Matador Cattle Co. in Montana for the Matador Sage Creek Refuge, 1974–1997
- Consultant design for the rest-rotation grazing system with MFWP of the 55,000-acre Mount Haggin Wildlife Management Area, about 10 miles southwest of Anaconda, Montana. Managed by the Montana Department of Fish Wildlife and Parks (MFWP).

== Achievements ==
=== Field research ===
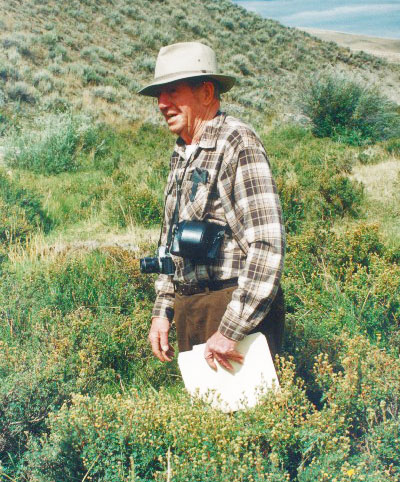
Gus Hormay, Age 90, Doing Field Work

Hormay left a living legacy of his work in the Matador National Demonstration Area on Matador's Sage Creek Allotment south of Dillon, Montana. The Nature Conservancy's Matador Ranch's national rest-rotation experimental demonstration area has been under rest-rotation range management system since 1974 when Hormay first installed the system while working for the Bureau of Land Management. It is a long-term concrete example of rest-rotation multiple-use land management. In 1992, Hormay and the Matador's Sage Creek Allotment received the Partners in Public Spirit Award, and in 1999, at the age of 92, Gus Hormay was still visiting the rest-rotation test plots on the Matador's Sage Creek Allotment and documenting the success of his initial experiment he had started twenty-five years earlier.

=== Awards ===
Awards given to Gus Hormay for his rest-rotation work across the western United States.

1. U.S. Department of Agriculture, Superior Service Award, 1957
2. U.S. Department of Interior, Distinguished Service Award, June 1971
3. Frederic G. Renner Award, Society for Range Management, February, 1973
4. Range Manager of the Year Award, California Section of the Society for Range Management, 1983
5. Society of American Foresters Award, May 13, 1983
6. Bureau of Land Management, Partners in Public Spirit Award, January 15, 1992

=== Publications ===
Publications by August L. Hormay:

- August Ludwig Hormay and A Fausett (1942). Standards for judging the degree of forage utilization of California annual-type ranges. Berkeley, California Forest and Range Experiment Station.
- August Ludwig Hormay (1942). A key for identifying some important annual range grasses in the immature stage. Berkeley, Calif., U.S. Department of Agriculture, Forest Service, California Forest and Range Experiment Station.
- August L Hormay (1942). Moderate Grazing Pays on California Annual-Type Ranges. United States Forest Service.
- A L Hormay (1943). Observations on species composition in northeastern California meadows as influenced by moisture supply. Berkeley, California Forest and Range Experiment Station.
- August Ludwig Hormay (1943). Bitterbrush in California. Berkeley, Calif., U.S. Department of Agriculture, Forest Service, California Forest and Range Experiment Station.
- August Ludwig Hormay (1944). Moderate grazing pays on California annual-type ranges. Washington, D.C., U.S. Dept. of Agriculture, Forest Service.
- M W Talbot and August Ludwig Hormay (1945). First-season records of cattle weights from a pine-timber range and a mountain meadow range. Berkeley, Calif., U.S. Department of Agriculture, Forest Service, California Forest and Range Experiment Station.
- August Ludwig Hormay (1946). Moderate grazing pays on California annual-type ranges. Washington, D.C., U.S. Dept. of Agriculture, Forest Service.
- Hormay, A. L. (1949). Getting Better Records of Vegetation Changes with the Line Interception Method, Journal of Range management, Vol.2, No. 2, April, 1949.
- Hormay, A.L. and Bentley, J.R. (1949). The Land-variability Factor in Cattle-grazing Experiments, Proceedings of the Berkeley Symposium on Mathematical Statistics and Probability, Univ. of Calif. Press, 1949, 465–467.
- Hormay, August L. (1956). How Livestock Grazing Habits and Growth Requirements of Range Plants Determine Sound Grazing Management, Journal of Range Management, Vol. 9, No. 4, July, 1956.
- A L Hormay and M W Talbot (1956). Increasing forage and livestock production on northeastern California mountain summer ranges. Berkeley, Calif., U.S. Dept. of Agriculture, Forest Service, California Forest and Range Experiment Station.
- August Ludwig Hormay and A B Evanko (1958). Rest-rotation grazing: a management system for bunchgrass ranges. Berkeley, California Forest and Range Experiment Station.
- August Ludwig Hormay (1960). Moderate grazing pays on California annual-type ranges. Washington, D.C., U.S. Dept. of Agriculture.
- A L Hormay and M W Talbot (1961). Rest-rotation grazing: a new management system for perennial bunchgrass ranges . Washington, D.C. U.S. Dept. of Agriculture, Forest Service.
- Hormay, A. L. (1966). Principles of Rest-Rotation Grazing and Multiple-Use Land Management, US Dept. Agr. Bureau of Land Management, 1966.
- August Ludwig Hormay (1970). Principles of rest-rotation grazing and multiple-use land management. Washington, Forest Service, U.S. Dept. of Agriculture.
- August Ludwig Hormay (1970). Outline summary of discussions: on rest-rotation grazing system.
- August Ludwig Hormay (1972). Principles of rest-rotation grazing and multiple-use land management. Washington, D.C., U.S. Department of the Interior, Bureau of Land Management : U.S. Department of Agriculture, Forest Service.
- August Ludwig Hormay (1987, 1970). Principles of rest-rotation grazing and multiple-use land management. Washington, D.C., U.S. Dept. of the Interior, Bureau of Land Management U.S. Dept. of Agriculture, Forest Service.

== See also ==
- Agriculture
- Ecology
- Habitat conservation
- Holistic management
- List of ecoregions in North America (CEC)
- Natural Resource
- Rangeland
- Sustainable agriculture
- Sustainable land management
- Wildlife Management
- Wildlife Management Area
