= Norman Strung =

English professor

Norman Strung (October 21, 1941 - October 17, 1991) was an U.S. English professor, outdoor guide, magazine editor and free-lance writer, focusing on outdoor recreational activities involving fishing and hunting.

== Life ==
Born in New York in 1941, Strung eventually moved to Bozeman, Montana, where he received his Bachelor of Science from Montana State University and married Priscilla Hoerschgen, both in 1963. Strung then attended the University of Montana in Missoula between 1963 and 1964, returning to Montana State immediately afterwards to begin teaching English. His early career involved teaching at the college while also working as an outdoor guide for both hunting and fishing. Strung was a free-lance writer for most of this time as well, contributing to many various outdoor publications throughout his life. This includes being an associate editor for Field and Stream, consultant for the Hunting and Fishing Library of America, and outdoor editor for Mechanix Illustrated.

== Writing career ==
While teaching English at Montana State University from 1964 to 1967, Strung fully began his writing career. Around June 1966, Strung provided correspondence for the Field and Stream article, "The Month the Madison Goes Wild," starting his work in magazine articles. Strung then began writing for books as well, coauthoring The Fisherman's Almanac and Family Fun Around the Water in 1970. Most of Strung's following work continued to focus on the outdoors and fishing, and by the end of his life he had authored, coauthored, or edited at least 15 different books. Strung also operated under two different pseudonyms, "Bart Yaeger" and "Asouff Barkee" for a large amount of his magazine work. Strung also acted as a ghostwriter for one author, Walter Cook, for several articles, including "Woodland Bison: World's Rarest Trophy" in the Sports Afield magazine.

Norman Strung's Book Publication Record
Book Title	Role	Year
The Fisherman's Almanac	Coauthor	1970
Family Fun Around the Water	Coauthor	1970
The Hunter's Almanac	Author	1971
Camping in Comfort	Coauthor	1971
The Complete Outdoor Cookbook	Contributor	1971
Winchester Hunter's Handbook	Contributor (1 chapter)	1972-1973
Deer Hunting: Tactics and Guns for Hunting All North American Deer	Author	1973
Spinfishing: The System That Does It All	Author	1973
Misty Mornings and Moonless Nights: A Waterfowler's Guide	Author	1974
Communicating the Outdoor Experience	Author	1975
The Complete Book of Boat Camping	Contributor (1 chapter)	1975
The Experts' Book of Upland Waterfowl	Editor	1975
The Experts' Book of Big Game Hunting	Editor	1976
Whitewater!	Coauthor	1976
The Cutting Edge: An Encyclopedia of Knives	Author	1977
All About Wildfowling in America	Editor	1976
The Complete Fisherman's Catalog	Contributor (1 chapter)	1977
The Complete Hunter's Catalog	Author	1977
Norm Strung's Pocket Guide to the Madison River	Author	1979
To Catch a Trout	Author	1979
Bass Fishing Handbook	Contributor (1 chapter)	1980
Fishing the Headwaters of the Missouri	Author	1981
Eppinger Dardevle Catalog	Contributor	1980
World Book Encyclopedia	Contributor	1982
The Art of Hunting	Author	1984

== Legacy ==
For the remainder of his life, Strung continued his writing career and outdoor pursuits, being heavily involved in the Outdoor Writers Association of America until a cancer diagnosis. This development led Strung to eventually take his own life on October 17, 1991, nearing his 50th birthday. Strung's written work and materials are currently held within the Montana State University Archives and Special Collections, available for public research and study.
