= Big Hole River =

River in Montana, United States

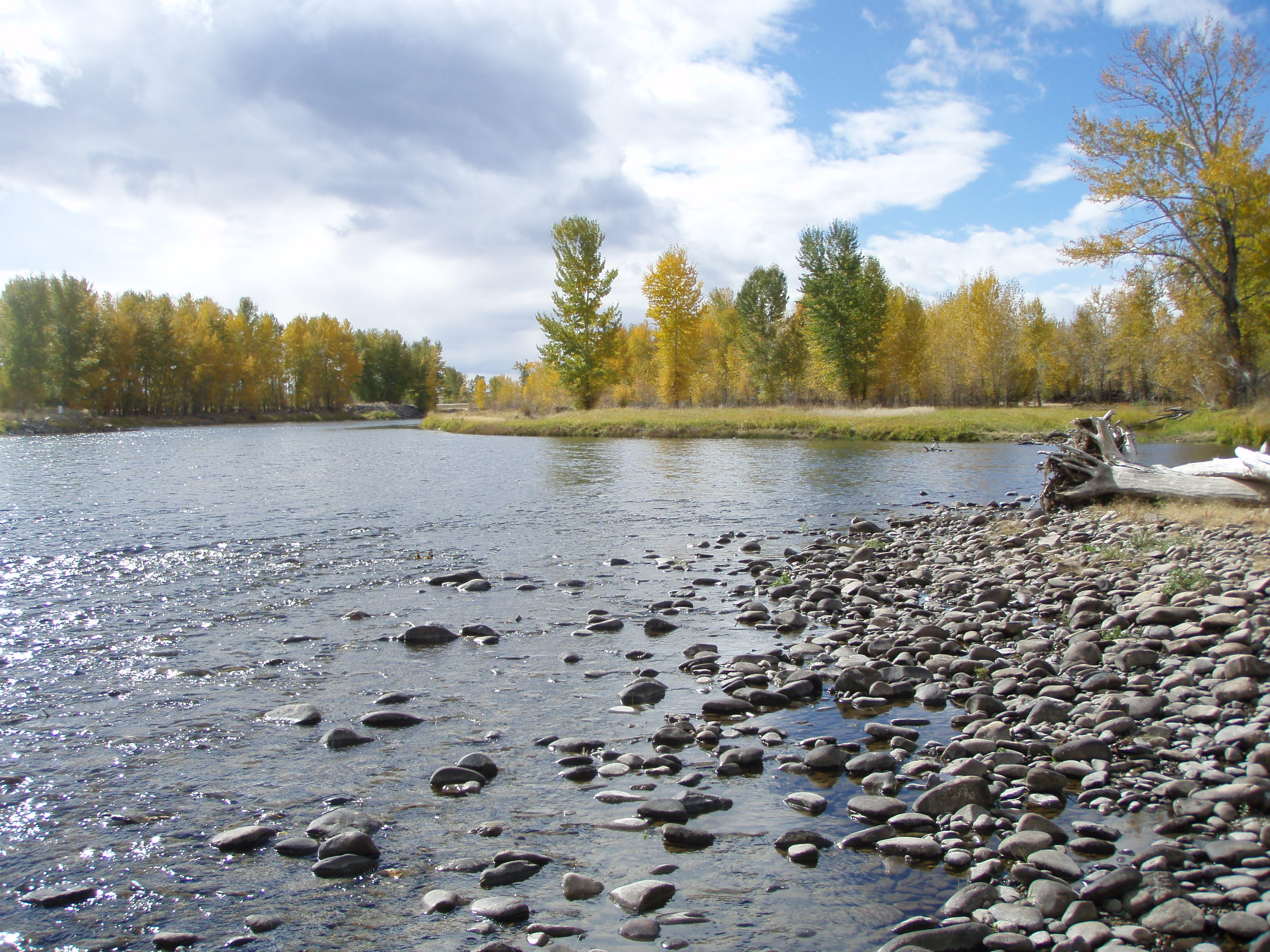
- Big Hole River near Twin Bridges, Montana

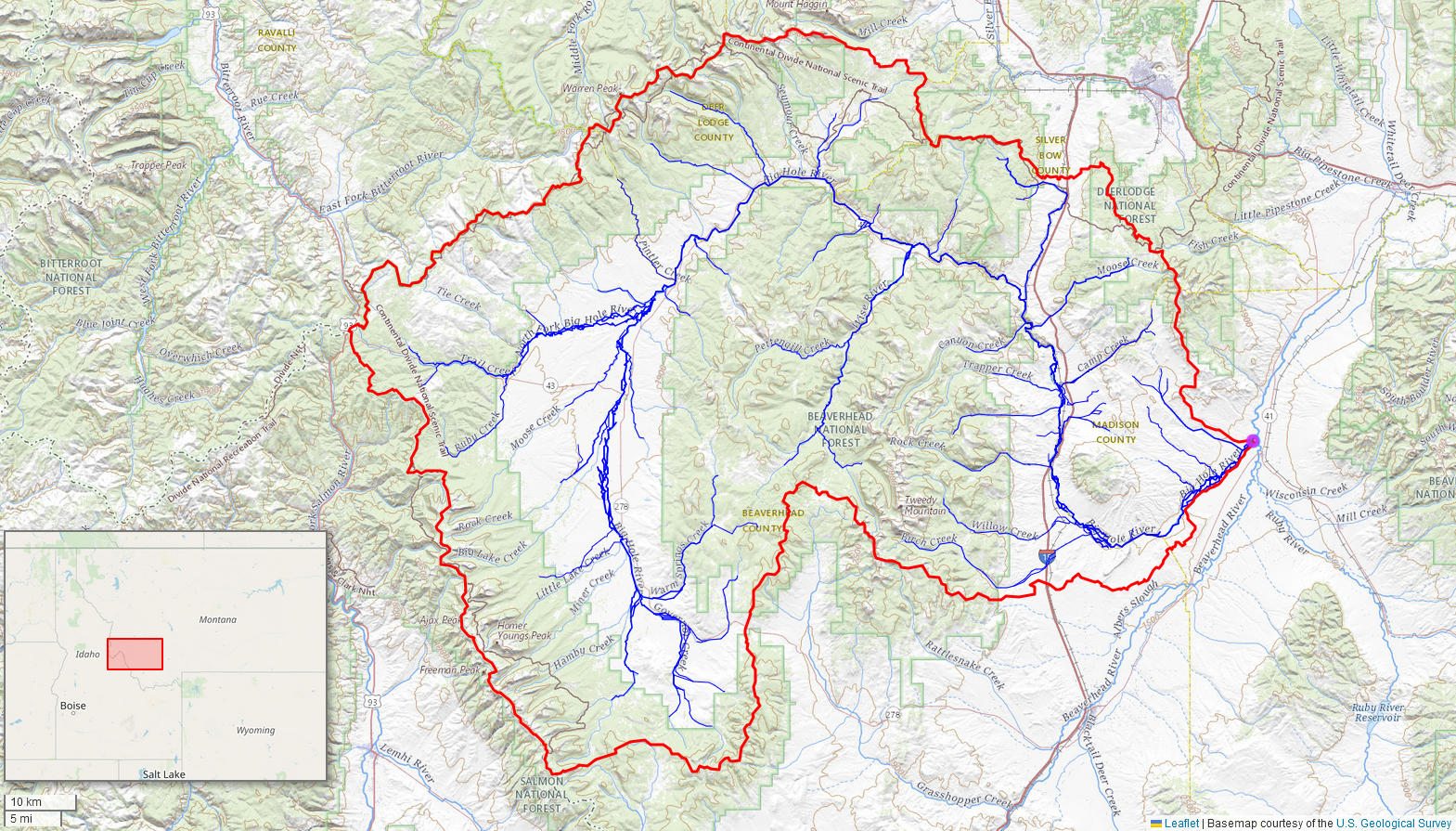
- Map of the Big Hole River watershed

- Location of mouth
- Native name: Sk͏ʷumcné Sewɫk͏ʷs

Location
- Country: United States
- State: Montana

Physical characteristics
- Source
  - location: Skinner Lake, Bitterroot Range, Montana, Beaverhead
  - coordinates: 45°10′22″N 113°30′42″W
  - elevation: 7,372 ft (2,247 m)
- Mouth: Jefferson River
  - location: Twin Bridges, Montana
  - coordinates: 45°34′04″N 112°20′21″W
  - elevation: 4,610 ft (1,410 m)
- Length: 153 mi (246 km)
- Basin size: 2,800 sq mi (7,300 km^{2})
- Discharge
  - location: near Twin Bridges
  - average: 1,250 cu ft/s (35 m^{3}/s)

Basin features
- Tributaries
  - right: Wise River

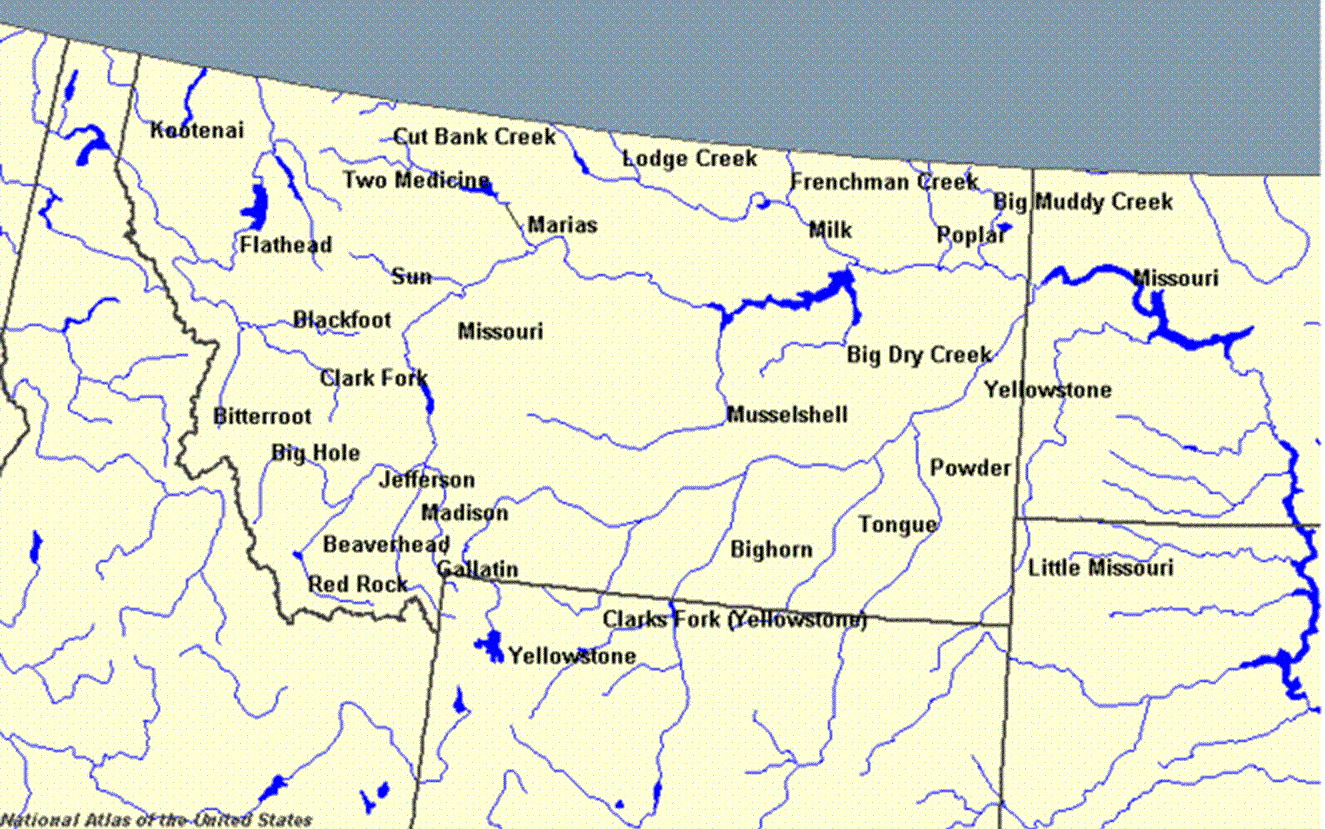
Montana rivers with the Big Hole in the southwest

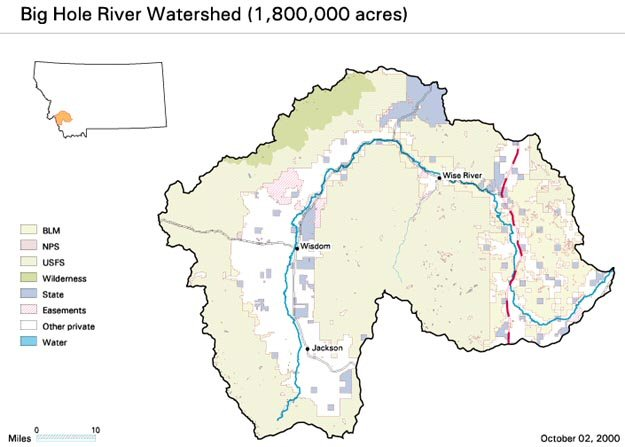
Big Hole River Watershed Map

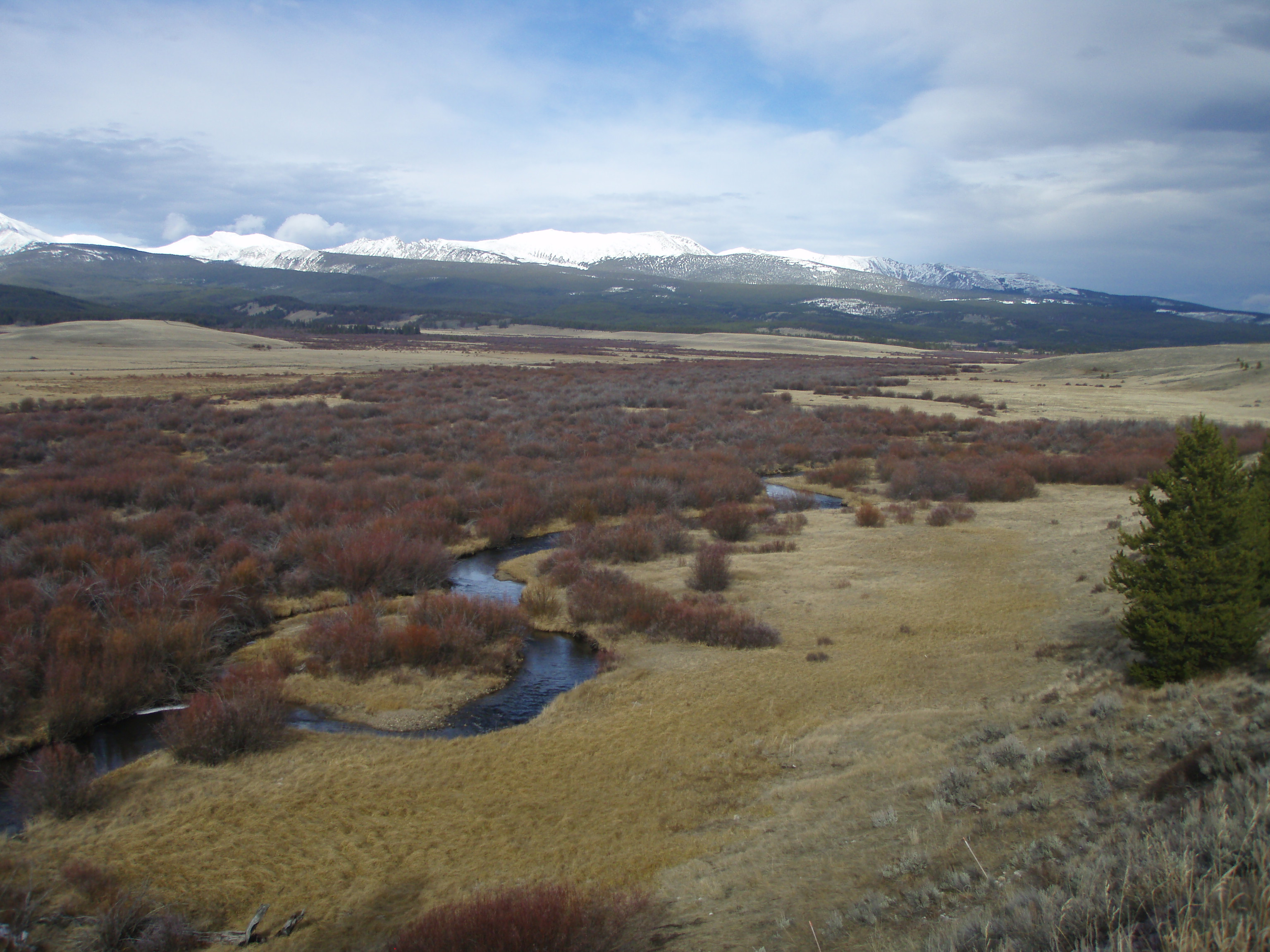
Upper Big Hole River near Jackson, Montana

The Big Hole River is a tributary of the Jefferson River, approximately 153 miles (246 km) long, in Beaverhead County, in southwestern Montana, United States. It is the last habitat in the contiguous United States for native fluvial Arctic grayling and is a historically popular destination for fly fishing, especially for trout.

== History ==
At the time the Lewis and Clark Expedition traveled through the Big Hole River watershed, it was a buffer zone between several rival Native American tribes including the Nez Percé, Shoshone, Coast Salish, and Blackfeet. Lewis and Clark considered navigating up the Big Hole River, which they called the Wisdom River, but chose the slower-flowing Beaverhead River instead. Trappers from both the Hudson's Bay Company, the North West Company and the American Fur Company exploited the region from about 1810 to the 1840s. Miners and homesteaders settled the area between 1864 and the early 1900s. The Montana Salish called the river Sk͏ʷumcné Sewɫk͏ʷs, meaning "waters of the pocket gopher".

In 1877 the U.S. troops under John Gibbon fought the Nez Percé indigenous Americans along the Big Hole River, during the Nez Perce War in the Battle of the Big Hole. The site of the battle along the North fork of the Big Hole is preserved as the Big Hole National Battlefield.

The establishment of Butte, Montana as a mining center and the coming of the Northern Railroad in 1871 assured Big Hole ranchers and farmers of a steady market for their beef, horses, mules, hay and dairy products. Ranches grew along the river from railroad supply points such as Divide, Montana. As a great improvement for preserving the wild hay for winter feeding of cattle, Herbert S. Armitage and David J. Stephens filed for a "Hay-Stacker" patent in 1909, which was awarded in 1910. This device, commonly known as a "beaverslide" remained popular until the 1990s, when it was largely displaced by mechanized equipment for producing large round bales.

== Watershed and course ==
The Big Hole River watershed drains 2,800 sq mi (7,300 km^{2}).

The source of the mainstem Big Hole River is Skinner Lake in the Beaverhead National Forest in the Beaverhead Mountains of the Bitterroot Range at the Continental Divide along the Montana-Idaho border in western Beaverhead County. However, Skinner Lake is in turn fed by Darkhorse Creek, which flows from Darkhorse and Cowbone Lakes, the former at 8,691 feet (2,649 m). The Big Hole River flows northwest and north, past Wisdom and between the Anaconda Range to the northwest and the Pioneer Mountains to the east.

Drone Shot of the Big Hole River

It flows around the north end of the Pioneers where it forms the border between Beaverhead County and Deer Lodge County and then Silver Bow County, then southeast past the town of Wise River, Montana, where it is joined by the Wise River. Near Glen, Montana it turns northeast and joins the Beaverhead River near Twin Bridges to form the Jefferson River, a tributary of the Missouri.

== Ecology and conservation ==
Historic conflicts exist between ranchers in the valley who use the river for irrigation and recreationalists. In the early 1960s, the US Bureau of Reclamation proposed building the Reichle Dam near the town of Glen along the Big Hole River. Conservationist George F. Grant, Trout Unlimited and local ranchers combined forces to oppose the dam, successfully defeating the proposal in 1967.

=== Grayling ===
The Big Hole is the last habitat in the contiguous United States for native fluvial (river-dwelling) Arctic grayling (Thymallis arcticus). Fluvial Arctic grayling lived historically in the United States only in Michigan and the upper Missouri River above Great Falls, Montana. Adfluvial or lake-dwelling Arctic grayling, still thrive across the western half of Montana. The fluvial population comprises the Upper Missouri River distinct population segment (DPS) population. The two populations are commonly called Montana Arctic grayling. The Big Hole River Watershed Committee (BHWC) was formed in 1995 by several Big Hole ranchers and some factions of the conservation community who opposed an ESA listing for fluvial Arctic grayling. The Watershed Committee reached out to local and selected interested entities and developed a viable community-based consensus group to forge solutions to difficult problems that impact the river. The committee was criticized for exclusion of activist voices such as the Center for Biological Diversity and the Montana Wildlife Federation. In response, organizations such as the Big Hole River Foundation were formed, with the goal "to understand, preserve, and enhance the free flowing character of the Big Hole River and to protect its watershed, culture, community and excellent wild trout fishery."

After years of debate by all interests in the Big Hole watershed, in April 2007, the U.S. Fish and Wildlife Service (USFWS) removed the fluvial Arctic Grayling from Endangered Species candidacy, which has resulted in a lawsuit by the Center for Biological Diversity and other interested parties, who have stated the view that the USFWS decision was politically mandated by Julie MacDonald, the former Department of Interior official who has since resigned. An Office of the Inspector General investigation found that "MacDonald has been heavily involved with editing, commenting on, and reshaping the Endangered Species Program's scientific reports." In the case of grayling, MacDonald ignored clear genetic differences between extremely rare fluvial (river) grayling and relatively common lacustrine (lake) grayling. In 2014, The USFWS again affirmed that local conservation efforts are sufficient to protect the grayling, and declined to list the DPS of the grayling as federally endangered.

An environmental DNA assay using tissue samples from grayling in the Bighole River can identify grayling with high specificity against other native and non-native salmonids in Montana.

== Angling the Big Hole ==
The Big Hole river has been a destination for trout fisherman since the late 1880s when The Angler's Guide, an Eastern angling journal advertised the Big Hole as a national destination fishery for grayling and trout while promising daily 40 lb (18 kg) catches. Although the river still holds some native westslope cutthroat trout, their populations are almost non-existent. Instead, the river holds healthy wild populations of brook, rainbow and brown trout which were first introduced into the Big Hole in late 1880s as hatchery operations began in Butte and Bozeman, Montana. Native mountain whitefish are also prevalent in the river. In the 1980s, the state of Montana began stopping general stocking of all Montana rivers. The last hatchery fish were stocked in the Big Hole in 1990. Dozens of guides, outfitters and fishing lodges offer guided fishing on the Big Hole and its tributaries. The river is catch and release for brown trout (Dickey bridge to mouth)

The river is a Class I water from the Fishtrap fishing access site downstream from Wisdom to its confluence with the Jefferson River. This status affects the level of public access for recreational purposes.

Sections of the Big Hole,
Section	Description	Prevalent Species
Skinner Lake (Headwaters), Wisdom, MT to Fish Trap (River Mile 81)	This is the slow moving, high meadow stretch of the Big Hole. It ends at the last public access site on the river: Fish Trap.	The meadow stretch is home to a few remaining native Fluvial Arctic Grayling and a good population of exotic Brook trout. Rainbows and browns are few in this section.
Fish Trap to Melrose	This section is characterized by bouldered pocket water as it flows through a narrow canyon. This is excellent stone fly water. This section has 5 public access sites: Sportsman Park (Mile 78), Dewey (Mile 57), Greenwood Bottoms (Mile 57), Powerhouse (Mile 52) and Maidenrock (Mile 48).	Rainbows dominate brown trout in this stretch 2:1 with approximately 3000 fish per mile.
Melrose to Twin Bridges, MT	This section is characterized by cottonwood bottoms with braided channels and long, slow pools. This is also excellent stone fly water. There are public access sites at Salmon Fly (Mile 38), Brownes Bridge (Mile 32), Kalsta Bridge (Mile 30), Glen (Mile 25), Notch Bottom (Mile 18), Pennington Bridge (Mile 9), High Road (Mile 2).	Browns dominate rainbow trout in this stretch 2:1 with approximately 3000 fish per mile.

== See also ==
- Pat Munday
- List of rivers of Montana
- Montana Stream Access Law
