= Datus C. Proper =

American political analyst and writer (1934–2003)

- Born: Datus C. Proper; April 18, 1934; Des Moines, Iowa
- Died: July 27, 2003; Bozeman, Montana
- Education: Cornell University (B.A. in English, 1956), George Washington University (M.A., 1978)
- Occupations: Political analyst, writer
- Employer: U.S. State Department
- Known for: What the Trout Said

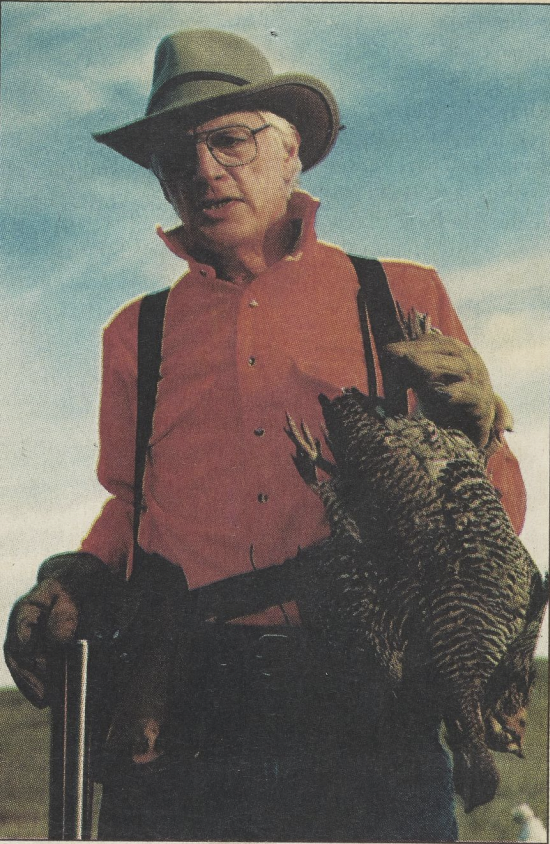
Datus C. Proper

Datus C. Proper (1934–2003) was a political analyst with the U.S. State Department Foreign Service, an outdoor writer, and a fly fisherman.

== Early life and education ==
Datus C. Proper was born on April 18, 1934, to William Glisan Proper and Marjorie Carryer Proper in Des Moines, Iowa. Proper spent most of his childhood moving around, living in Iowa, Nebraska, and Northern Minnesota. He then lived in Yellowstone National Park, where his father was stationed as an officer for the park. Proper eventually came to earn a scholarship to Phillips Exeter Academy in New Hampshire. When he graduated, he moved on to Cornell University, where he earned a bachelor's degree in English in 1956.

== Foreign Service career ==
After Proper graduated from Cornell University, he joined the U.S. State Department. As a Foreign Service officer and political analyst, he traveled to Angola, Brazil, Portugal and Ireland. During these travels, Proper took advantage of the opportunity to hunt and fish. While with the State Department, Proper also received an M.A. from George Washington University and completed a course of study at the National War College in 1978. State Department records of Proper exist for many parts throughout his career, one of which describes a protest against the Vietnam War in 1970, and how the government intended to retaliate against concerned employees.

Proper retired from the State Department 1987. Following his retirement, Proper and his family moved to the Gallatin Valley in Montana, where he began a full-time career as a writer.

== Writing career ==
During Proper's time with the State Department, he wrote and published a number of sporting articles as well as his first book, What the Trout Said. After becoming a full-time writer, Proper was a regular contributor to Field and Stream Magazine and wrote hundreds of articles for other outdoors publications. Proper focused on other subjects as well, writing about his experiences in Portugal and on training dogs for sport and pheasant hunting. Proper also wrote several more books, all of which used essays from previous magazine articles paired with additional pieces of writing.

== Personal life ==
Proper met his future wife, Anna Therese Collins, in Ireland while he was serving in the country with the U.S. State Department. In 1975, the couple married, and they had two sons. The couple shared a loving relationship, making their home together in Bozeman, Montana.

== Later years ==
Just before his death, Proper completed a rough draft of a new book on hunting. On July 27, 2003, Datus Proper drowned while fishing in the Hyalite Creek outside of Bozeman, Montana. According to authorities, he slipped on rocks and hit his head.

== Selected publications ==
- Proper, Datus C. Running Waters. Guilford, CT: Lyons Press, 2001.
- Proper, Datus C. Pheasants of the Mind : A Hunter's Search for a Mythic Bird. Limited ed. Bozeman, MT: Wilderness Adventures Press, 1994.
- Proper, Datus C. The Last Old Place : A Search through Portugal. New York: Simon & Schuster, 1992.
- Proper, Datus C. What the Trout Said about the Design of Trout Flies and Other Mysteries. 1st ed. New York: Alfred A. Knopf, 1982.
