= Bud Lilly =

American fly fisherman (1925-2017)

- Born: Walen Francis Lilly II; August 13, 1925; Manhattan, Montana
- Died: January 4, 2017; Bozeman, Montana
- Education: Montana State University, bachelor's degree in Applied Science; University of Montana, master's degree in education (1951)
- Occupation: Fly fisherman
- Known for: Fly fishing guide and owner of "The Trout Shop" in West Yellowstone

Bud Lilly (1925-2017) was the owner of the Trout Shop in West Yellowstone, Montana as well as an accomplished baseball player, fly fishing guide, and conservationist.

== Early life and career in education ==
Walen Francis “Bud” Lilly II was born on August 13, 1925, in Manhattan, Montana, to Violet Collins, a homemaker, and Walen Lilly, a barber. Bud graduated from Manhattan High School in 1942. After serving in the United States Armed Forces, he enrolled in Montana State University in Bozeman in 1946 and earned a bachelor's degree in Applied Science. In 1951, Lilly earned his master's degree in education from the University of Montana in Missoula. He then became a public school math and science teacher in Bozeman and Deer Lodge until his retirement in 1970. He briefly also worked as a teacher in Scottsdale, Arizona. Lilly has continued to promote trout education by donating and being a large supporter of the Trout & Salmonid Special Archives collection in Montana State University's Library.

== Involvement in baseball ==
Bud's father, Bud Sr., was a fan of baseball and taught Bud to play. At age five, Bud received his first bat and glove, and he began playing in sandlot games. At age twelve, Lilly began playing organized baseball, playing in both American Legion and town-team baseball. He rapidly gained more experience. At fourteen, he became the youngest player on the Gallatin Valley Men's Team, an independent baseball team whose players ranged in age from fourteen to fifty. Bud played second base.

While on the Gallatin Valley Men's Team, Lilly played in an exhibition game against “a Negro League traveling team," including Satchel Paige, a pitcher who was later inducted into the Baseball Hall of Fame and became the oldest rookie in Major League baseball. Lilly managed to get a hit on a pitch from the famed player and make it to first base, but got out when he attempted to steal second.

In 1940, two men from the Cincinnati Reds scouted the team. He was not given an offer at the time. In 1942, the men returned to watch Bud play again. They offered him a minor-league contract to play with the Cincinnati Reds farm team, the Salt Lake City Bees. Instead, with World War II ravaging the country, Lilly joined the military.

== Military career ==
In 1942, Lilly joined the U.S. Armed Forces and travelled to Butte, Montana to train in the V-12 program for U.S. Navy Officers. After two years in the program, Lilly received his commission and “reported to St. John’s Cathedral in New York." He then journeyed to Bainbridge, MD to go through Navy boot camp.

Lilly trained in Miami from May–July 1945 on destroyers, sub-chasers, and PT boats. Following this training, he shipped out to Italy on the way to invade Japan with the U.S. Forces. During his service, Bud Lilly was assigned to the USS General R.M. Blatchford. At the age of twenty, he was third in command, after the captain the officer, meaning that if both the captain and officer had been killed, he would gain command of the ship. Because of this, Lilly knew how to handle the ship and knew navigation by celestial stars & objects. He visited Hiroshima, Japan after its bombing by U.S. forces. In 1946, Lilly left the military and returned to Montana to continue his education.

== Fly fishing and The Trout Shop ==
Bud Lilly's father was an avid flyfisher, however growing up he claims to not be a "sophisticated" fly fisherman. In West Yellowstone, he saw the many fisherman who would visit with "rods made by famous rodbuilders, [...] and they taught [him] about fly tying, catch & release, and dry fly fishing."

During his time as a public school teacher, Lilly began working another job in West Yellowstone and washed cars for extra cash. While in West Yellowstone, he had heard of a tackle shop for sale. In 1952, Lilly purchased the shop and "Bud Lilly's Fly Shop" was born. The shop gathered information about local fishing conditions, provided a space for fishermen to congregate, and offered fly fishing services and items like tackle and flies. Purchased for $4,500, Lilly estimates that he made millions of dollars off of the shop; a lot of this money was used to give back into conservation efforts. Lilly says, "If you're going to save it, we have to contribute."

Lilly also sent out promotional literature and catalogues for fly-fishing and taught fly-fishing lessons. He became a fishing guide on the Madison, Gallatin, and Yellowstone rivers, guiding for over 35 years. Some of his clients included Tom Brokaw, Jimmy Carter, and British Ambassador Sir Peter Ramsbotham. He also advocated for catch-and-release fishing and created a club at his shop to encourage the practice in Montana that gave fishermen silver buttons for releasing trout of various lengths. In addition, he supported women's involvement in fly fishing by offering “women-only fishing trips” and assisting in creating “women’s fly-fishing clubs”.

“I was always engaged by the instant of the strike,” he wrote in his autobiography, published in 1988. “It doesn’t matter how many thousands of trout I’ve taken since. I still have the same excitement when I put a fly over a trout and a miracle happens.”

The shop also published several editions of a merchandising catalogue and a fishing map of the area in tandem with California businessman David Bascomb. When Lilly's first wife, Patricia, grew ill in 1981, Lilly decided to sell the shop in 1982, although the shop still bore his name during the tenure of the next few owners.

== Personal life ==
Bud Lilly married Patricia Bennett on March 15, 1947. The couple had three children: Gregory, Michael, and Annette. After Patricia died in 1984 of lung cancer, Lilly then married Esther Simon. The couple had two children: Christopher and Alisa.

== Work in conservation ==
Bud Lilly also had an active career in conservation work. He was a director of the Greater Yellowstone Coalition, a director of the Whirling Disease Foundation, a director-at-large for the American Wildlands, a board member of the Montana Land Resilience, a member of the National Federation of Fly Fishers, and a member of the Greater Yellowstone Coalition. He has also worked with Trout Unlimited, which he helped found, since its inception in 1962. Lilly also served as the organization's first president.

Following his work with the Trout Shop, Lilly continued his conservation activism. Lilly's main causes were protecting trout and restoring waterways through preventing overgrazing and extensive logging near headwaters and major bodies of water. He also worked to modify standard practices concerning stocking of hatchery fish and campaigned for increasing wild trout populations in Montana. He was “credited as one of the pioneers of the catch-and-release movement,” which he began in the 1950s, “long before it became the norm." He initially heard about catch and release from Michigan fishermen, and made it his cause, reasoning that the popularity of fly-fishing in Montana might deplete the stocks of trout. He also created a catch-and-release club in his shop, selling fishermen silver buttons that boasted of their releases of trout of various lengths.

Lilly was affiliated with Trout Unlimited in the late 1950s, and helped to found Montana Trout Unlimited in 1964.

== Awards and recognition ==
Lilly received an honorary doctorate from Montana State University. He was also inducted into the Federation of Fly Fishers Hall of Fame and awarded the Heritage Award for lifetime achievement from the American Museum of Fly Fishing. Bud also helped assemble the almost 10,000-volume collection of books, manuscripts and personal papers at Montana State University known as the Bud Lilly Trout and Salmonid Initiative. Bud Lilly's papers as well as oral interviews can be found in the Archives & Special Collections section of Montana State University's Library.

== Later years ==
After his mother's death in 1994, Lilly remodeled “The Angler’s Retreat,” a lodge in Three Forks, Montana, to create an eighteen-room retreat for fly fishers in Montana. He also founded the Western Rivers Club, an organization he created to “keep his former customers in touch”. Lilly volunteered as a Montana Ambassador, a state-sponsored program to encourage tourism and recreation in the state, and worked as a river keeper for Baker Springs, a land development company near his hometown of Manhattan, Montana.

In his later years, Lilly's vision deteriorated due to macular degeneration, but he continued to fish frequently with friends. He also founded the Warriors and Quiet Waters Foundation, which “brings disabled vets to Montana to introduce them to fly fishing and the therapeutic power of ever-flowing waters”. Bud Lilly died in Bozeman, Montana on January 4, 2017 from heart failure at the age of 91.

== Publications ==
- Lilly, Bud., and Paul. Schullery. A Trout's Best Friend: The Angling Autobiography of Bud Lilly. 1st ed. Boulder, Colo.: Pruett, 1988.
- Lilly, Bud., and Paul. Schullery. Bud Lilly's Guide to Fly Fishing the New West. Portland, OR: Frank Amato Publications, 2000.
- Lilly, Bud., and Paul. Schullery. Bud Lilly's Guide to Western Fly Fishing. Deluxe ed. New York, NY: Nick Lyons Books, 1987.
- Bud Lilly's Trout Shop. Bud Lilly's Trout Shop: Fly Fishing Catalogue., 1980.
- Bud Lilly's Trout Shop. Bud Lilly's Tackle Catalogue and Handbook for Western Trout Fishing.
