= Leigh (surname) =

Leigh is a surname, and may refer to:

== A ==
- Abby Leigh, American artist
- Abisogun Leigh, Nigerian academic and administrator
- Adele Leigh (1928–2004), English operatic soprano
- Alex Leigh (born 1978), English fashion model
- Alice Leigh-Smith (born 1907), Croatian-born nuclear physicist
- Andrew Leigh (born 1972), Australian politician, lawyer and academic
- Angela Leigh (1927–2004), ballet dancer in Canada
- Anthony Leigh (died 1692), English comic actor
- Arethusa Leigh-White (1885–1959), British guiding and girl scout leader
- Augusta Leigh (1783–1851), only daughter of John "Mad Jack" Byron
- Augustus Austen Leigh (1840–1905), Provost of King's College, Cambridge
- Austin Leigh, British stage and film actor
- Ava Leigh (born 1985), English reggae singer

== B ==
- Barbara Leigh (born 1946), American actress and fashion model.
- Barbara Leigh-Hunt (1935–2024), English actress
- Benjamin W. Leigh (1781–1849), American lawyer and politician from Virginia
- Bianca Leigh, American actress
- Blake Leigh-Smith (born 1990), Australian motorcycle racer
- Bradshaw Leigh, American audio engineer
- Brendon Leigh (born 1999), British esports driver

== C ==
- Carma Leigh (1904–2009), American librarian
- Carol Leigh (1951–2022), American writer and activist
- Carolyn Leigh (1926–1983), American lyricist and composer
- Carolyn Leigh (artist) (born 1945), American artist, author and art dealer
- Chandos Leigh, 1st Baron Leigh (1791–1850), British landowner
- Charles Leigh (American football) (1945–2006), American football player
- Charles Leigh (physician) (1662–1701), English physician and naturalist
- Charles Leigh (British Army officer) (1748–1815), British general
- Charles Leigh (librarian) (1871–1940), English academic librarian
- Charles Leigh (merchant) (died 1605), English merchant and voyager
- Charles Leigh (1686–1749), British politician
- Cherami Leigh (born 1988), American actress and voice actress
- Chyler Leigh (born 1982), American actress
- Claude Moss Leigh (1888–1964), English businessman
- Conrad Heighton Leigh (1883–1958), English artist and illustrator
- C. S. Leigh (1964 – reported dead 2016), British-American film director

== D ==
- Damon Leigh, English professional wrestler
- Danni Leigh (born 1970), American country music singer
- David Leigh (journalist), British investigative journalist
- David Leigh (scientist) (born 1963), British chemist
- David Leigh (swimmer) (born 1956), British swimmer
- Dawda Leigh (born 1986), Norwegian footballer
- Dennis Leigh (footballer) (born 1949), English footballer
- Dianne Leigh (born c. 1941), Canadian country music performer
- Dorian Leigh (1917–2008), American model
- Dorma Leigh (1890–1969), British dancer, actress and playwright
- Dorothy Leigh (died c.1616), English writer
- Doug Leigh, Canadian figure skating coach
- Douglas Leigh (1907–1999), American advertising executive and designer

== E ==
- Ed Leigh (born 1975), British television presenter
- Edward Leigh (born 1950), British politician
- Edward Leigh (writer) (1602–1671), English politician and lay writer on religious topics
- Edward Leigh (cricketer, born 1913) (1913–1994), English cricketer
- Edward Chandos Leigh (1832–1915), English barrister and cricketer
- Edward Leigh, 5th Baron Leigh (1742–1786), English collector
- Edwin Leigh (1815–1890), American educationalist
- Egbert Leigh (born 1940), American evolutionary ecologist
- Egerton Leigh (1815–1876), British soldier and politician
- Egerton Leigh (priest) (1702–1760), English Anglican cleric and landowner
- Sir Egerton Leigh, 1st Baronet (1733–1781), British colonial jurist
- Sir Egerton Leigh, 2nd Baronet (1762–1818), English evangelical minister
- Elinor Leigh, British actor of the 17th century
- Elizabeth Medora Leigh (1814–1849), daughter of Augusta Leigh
- Ernest Leigh (1895–1960), British gymnast
- Eva Leigh, American author of romantic fiction and erotica
- Eva Leigh (artist) (1895–1981), English artist
- Evan Leigh (1810–1876), English engineer and manufacturer of cotton spinning equipment
- Eve Leigh (born 1984), American playwright in the United Kingdom, daughter of Abby Leigh and Mitch Leigh

== F ==
- Francis Leigh (MP for Oxford) (c.1579–1625), English barrister and politician
- Francis Leigh (died 1644), English politician
- Francis Leigh (MP for Kent) (c.1651–1711), English Member of Parliament and lawyer
- Francis Leigh (MP for Kildare) (fl. 1663–1692), Irish Jacobite politician
- Francis Leigh, 1st Earl of Chichester (1598–1653), English Royalist courtier
- Francis Leigh, 3rd Baron Leigh (1855–1938), British landowner
- Frank Leigh (1876–1948), British stage and film actor
- Fred W. Leigh (1871–1924), English lyricist of music hall songs

== G ==
- Geoff Leigh (born 1945), English musician
- Geoff Leigh (politician) (born 1952), Australian politician
- George Leigh (by 1530 – 1578), English politician
- Gerard Leigh or Legh (d. 1563), English lawyer and author of a treatise on heraldry
- Gilbert Leigh (1851–1884), British politician.
- Graham Leigh (born 1975), American football quarterback
- Greg Leigh (born 1994), English footballer
- Gustavo Leigh (1920–1999), Chilean general

== H ==
- Harry Leigh (1888 – after 1912), English footballer
- Hazel Vaughn Leigh (1897–1995), American philanthropist and civic leader
- Helen Boughton-Leigh (1906–1999), American alpine skier
- Henry Hilton Leigh (1832–1911), Irish-Peruvian business magnate and philanthropist
- Henry Sambrooke Leigh (1837–1883), English writer and playwright
- Henry Leigh-Bennett (1852–1903), English politician
- H. Eugene Leigh (1860–1937), American racehorse trainer, owner and breeder
- Howard Leigh (broadcaster) (born 1951), Australian boxing announcer
- Howard Leigh, Baron Leigh of Hurley (born 1959), British businessman and life peer
- Humphrey de Verd Leigh (1897–1980), British Royal Air Force officer

== I ==
- Ian Leigh (born 1962), English football goalkeeper
- Irene Leigh, British dermatologist
- Isabel Leigh (c.1496–1573), English courtier

== J ==
- Jack Leigh (1948–2004), American photographer and author
- Jacob Leigh (born 1967), British film scholar
- James Leigh (cricketer) (1862–1925), English cricketer
- James Mathews Leigh (1808–1860), British art educator, writer and dramatist
- Janet Leigh (1927–2004), American actress
- Jeff Leigh (1950–2012), New Zealand cricketer
- Jen Leigh, American news anchor
- Jennifer Leigh (born 1983), American professional poker player
- Jennifer Jason Leigh (born 1962), American actress
- Jesse Leigh, American actor
- John Leigh (MP for Hythe) (fl.1421–1432), English Member of Parliament for Hythe
- John Leigh (died 1612), English politician
- John Leigh (Yarmouth MP) (c.1598–c.1666), English politician
- John Leigh (18th-century actor) (1689–1726), Irish actor and dramatist
- John Leigh (doctor) (1812–1888), English doctor and public health administrator
- John Leigh (Wisconsin politician) (1827–1893), American politician
- John Leigh (New Zealand actor) (born 1965), New Zealand actor
- Sir John Leigh, 1st Baronet (1884–1959), British mill-owner, newspaper proprietor and politician
- John Leigh (ambassador), diplomat from Sierra Leone
- Joie Leigh (born 1993), English field hockey player
- Joseph Leigh (1841–1908), British industrialist and politician
- Julia Leigh (born 1970), Australian novelist, film director and screenwriter
- J. Paul Leigh, American economist

== K ==
- Katie Leigh (born 1958), American voice actress

== L ==
- Laurie Leigh (born 1932), English actress
- Leigh Leigh (1975–1989), Australian murder victim, see Murder of Leigh Leigh
- Leslie William Leigh (1921–1980), Sierra Leonean police officer
- Lewis Leigh (footballer) (born 2003), English footballer
- Lora Leigh (born 1965), American romance novelist

== M ==
- Makenzie Leigh (born 1990), American actress
- Margaret Leigh (1894–1973), English writer
- Mary Leigh (1885–1979), English political activist and suffragette
- Megan Leigh (1964–1990), American actress
- Mercedes Leigh (born 1867), American actress
- Mickey Leigh, American musician and writer
- Mike Leigh (born 1943), British screenwriter and director
- Mike Leigh (sailor) (born 1984), Canadian competitive sailor
- Mildred Leigh (1902–1997), American teacher and administrator
- Mitch Leigh (1928–2014), musical theatre composer
- Molly Leigh (1685–1748), English property owner, alleged witch
- Monroe Leigh (1919–2001), American political philosopher and diplomat

== N ==
- Nelson Leigh (1905–1985), American film actor
- Neville Leigh (1922–1994), British civil servant

== O ==
- Octavius Leigh-Clare (1841–1912), British barrister and politician
- Odie Leigh, American indie folk musician

== P ==
- Percival Leigh (1813–1889), English satirist and comic writer
- Peter Leigh (1939–2024), English footballer

== R ==
- Ralph Leigh (1915–1987), British academic, authority on Rousseau
- Ray Leigh (1928–2025), British architect and designer
- Richard Leigh (author) (1943–2007), co-author of The Holy Blood and the Holy Grail
- Richard Leigh Jr (1784–1841), English cricketer
- Richard Leigh (cricket patron), 18th-century English businessman and cricket patron
- Richard Leigh (martyr) (c.1557–1588), English Catholic martyr
- Richard Leigh (officer of arms) (died 1597), English herald, Clarenceux King of Arms
- Richard Leigh (poet) (1649/50–1728), English poet
- Richard Leigh (songwriter) (born 1951), American country music songwriter
- Richard Leigh known as Beaver Dick, English-American trapper, scout and guide
- Richard H. Leigh (1870–1946), United States Navy officer
- Robert Leigh (physicist), Canadian physicist
- Robert K. Leigh (1852–1925), Hong Kong architect and civil engineer
- Robert Devore Leigh (1890–1961), American educator, political scientist and library scientist
- Robert Holt Leigh (1762–1843), British Member of Parliament and baronet
- Roberta Leigh (1926–2014), British writer of romance fiction and children's stories
- Roger Leigh (1840–1924), English politician
- Roger Allen Leigh, British plant scientist
- Roger Leigh-Wood (1906–1987), English athlete
- Ronald Leigh-Hunt (1920–2005), British film and television actor
- Rowland Leigh (1902–1963), Anglo-American lyricist, librettist and screenwriter
- Rowland Leigh (MP) (died by 1604), English Member of Parliament
- Rowley Leigh (born 1950), British chef, restaurateur and journalist

== S ==
- Samuel Leigh (bookseller) (c.1780–1831), British bookseller and publisher
- Samuel Leigh (missionary) (1785–1852), British missionary to Australia and New Zealand
- Sanford R. Leigh (born 1934), American civil rights activist
- Simone Leigh (born 1967), American artist
- Sonia Leigh (born 1978), American country music singer-songwriter
- Spencer Leigh (actor) (born c. 1963), English actor
- Spencer Leigh (radio presenter) (born 1945), British radio presenter and author
- Stephen Leigh (born 1951), American science fiction and fantasy writer
- Steven Vincent Leigh (born 1964), American actor and martial artist
- Stanley Leigh (1901–1986), British gymnast
- Suzanna Leigh (1945–2017), British film actress
- Syd Leigh (born 1893), English footballer

== T ==
- Terri Leigh (born 1981), Canadian television anchor
- Theophilus Leigh (died 1785), English academic administrator
- Thomas Leigh (Lord Mayor) (c.1504–1571), English merchant
- Thomas Leigh, 1st Baron Leigh (1595–1672), English Royalist politician
- Thomas Pemberton Leigh, 1st Baron Kingsdown (1793–1867), British barrister, judge and politician
- Thomas Leigh-Goldie (1807–1854), British Army officer
- Tom Leigh (RAF officer) (1919–1944), Australian Royal Air Force officer
- Tommy Leigh (footballer, born 1875) (1875–1914), English footballer
- Tommy Leigh (footballer, born 2000), English footballer
- Trafford Leigh-Mallory (1892–1944), air chief marshal
- Tristan Leigh (born 2003), American football player

== V ==
- Vera Leigh (1903–1944), British SOE agent
- Victoria Leigh Soto (1985–2012), a teacher who died protecting her students during the Sandy Hook Elementary School shooting
- Vivien Leigh (1913–1967), British actress

== W ==
- Walter Leigh (1905–1942), English composer
- Walter Leigh (footballer) (1874–1938), English footballer
- Wentworth Leigh (1838–1923), Anglican priest
- William Leigh (1550–1639), English priest
- William Leigh (Dean of Hereford) (1752–1808), Anglican priest
- William Leigh (judge) (1783–1871), American jurist
- William Colston Leigh Sr. (1901–1992), American founder of the W. Colston Leigh Bureau
- William Gerard Leigh (1915–2008), British soldier and polo player
- William Henry Leigh (merchant) (1781–1818), merchant and colonial official in Sierra Leone
- William Henry Leigh, 2nd Baron Leigh (1824–1905), British politician
- William Robinson Leigh (1866–1955), American artist and illustrator
- Willie Leigh (1907–1972), English snooker and billiards player

== Z ==
- Zebulon Lewis Leigh (1906–1996), Canadian aviator

== See also ==
- Austen-Leigh
- Leigh-Pemberton
- Legh (surname)
- Lea (surname)
- Lee (surname)
