= Montana State University Archives and Special Collections =

US archival institute

Coordinates: 45.66662°N 111.04866°W

The Montana State University Archives and Special Collections, also known as the Merrill G. Burlingame Archives and Special Collections, is located in Bozeman, Montana. The archives is on the second floor of the Renne Library on the Montana State University-Bozeman campus and consists of materials relating to the history of the American West, trout and salmonids, the Greater Yellowstone Ecosystem and other topics.

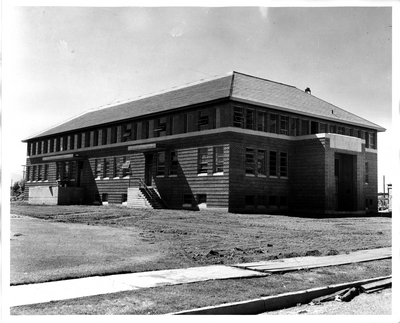
Montana State College Library, circa 1950

== About ==
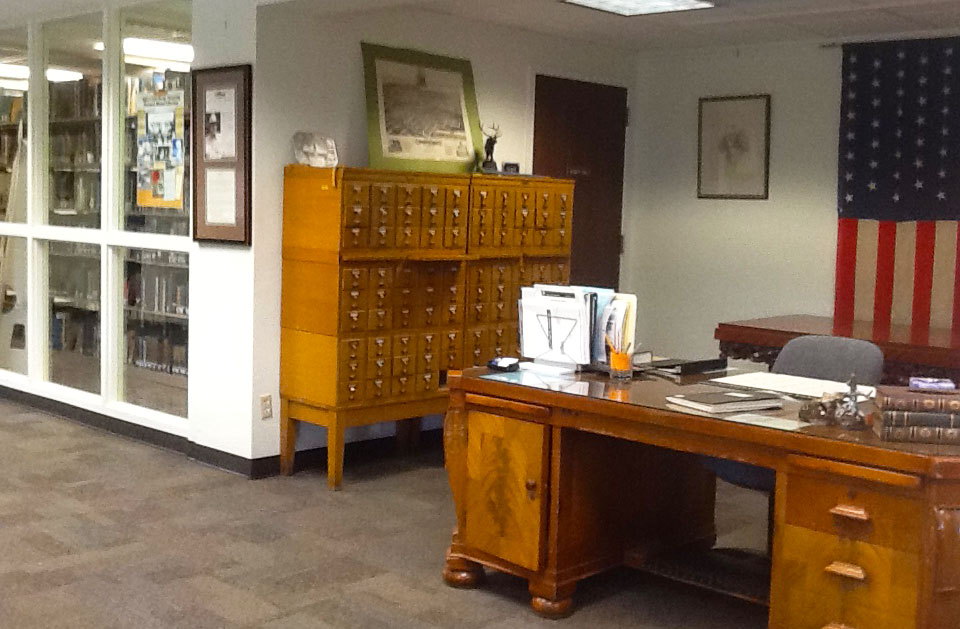
Montana State Library Archives and Special Collections Reading Room

The Merrill G. Burlingame Special Collections is located in the Montana State University Library in Bozeman, Montana. Merrill G. Burlingame and Minnie Paugh were instrumental to the creation and development of the archive, establishing a solid foundation of research and collection of regionally important materials. Minnie Paugh (1919–2003) was a reference librarian and instructor at Montana State College (now Montana State University), where she helped establish the university's Archives and Special Collections. She was a prolific researcher and writer, contributing to several Montana history books. Paugh also generated a collection of oral histories, consisting of notes, tapes, interviews, photographs, and historical ephemera. Her interests included indigenous tribes of the North American West, particularly those in Montana, Yellowstone National Park, and the agricultural and ranching history of Montana. Paugh made significant contributions to the area of Montana history, the development of Montana State University's Archives and Special Collections, and the creation of an extensive Montana oral history collection held at Montana State University. Paugh's work is housed at the Montana State University Archives and Special Collections, including books, unpublished materials, and family histories. In addition to her own materials, the Merrill G. Burlingame Archives and Special Collections contains many collections that Paugh personally worked on and contributed to. Similarly, Merrill G. Burlingame (1901–1994) was a prolific researcher and historian who published numerous works essential to the development of the archive. Burlingame was a history professor at Montana State College and an active member in the creation of the Museum of the Rockies. These included journal publications and books on topics such as politics in Montana, the military in Montana, and general history of the American West.

The areas of collection at the MSU Archives and Special Collections include eleven broad areas of collection.

- Agriculture
- Architecture and Engineering
- Montana and the American West
- Native Americans
- Montana State University History
- People of Montana
- Trout, Salmonids, and Angling
- Politics and Government
- The Greater Yellowstone Ecosystem
- Women's and Gender Histories
- Regional Writers and Narratives

In addition to physical holdings, the MSU Library also produces and manages digital collections, which include the complete digitization of the Ivan Doig Archive, the Montanan Yearbooks collection, and the 1972 Montana Constitutional Convention Oral History collection.

== Notable collections ==
There are numerous collections of note held at the Montana State Archives and Special Collections, including collections on Yellowstone National Park, environmental history and ecology of the North American West, Native Americans, Western writers, and more.

- Trout and Salmonid Collection
- Jack Ellis Haynes and Haynes Inc. Records
- F. Jay Haynes Papers
- Ivan Doig Archive
- Burton K. Wheeler Papers
- Fort Ellis and Gustavus C. Doane Collection
- Yellowstone Park Company Records
- Mildred J. Leigh Papers
- Marian T. Place Papers
- James Willard Schultz Papers
- Thomas Mcguane Papers
