= Leigh-Pemberton =

Leigh-Pemberton or Leigh Pemberton may refer to:

- Edward Leigh Pemberton (1823–1910), Conservative Member of Parliament for East Kent 1868–1885
- James Leigh-Pemberton (born 1956), British banker and the Receiver-General for the Duchy of Cornwall
- John Leigh-Pemberton (1911–1997), British artist and illustrator
- Robin Leigh-Pemberton, Baron Kingsdown (1927–2013), Governor of the Bank of England 1983–1993
- Wykeham Leigh Pemberton (1833–1918), British army officer

== See also ==
- Thomas Pemberton Leigh, 1st Baron Kingsdown (1793–1867), English lawyer and Parliamentarian
- Leigh (surname)
- Pemberton (surname)
