= Henry Leigh =

Henry Leigh may refer to:

- Henry Hilton Leigh (1832–1911), Irish-Peruvian business magnate and philanthropist
- Henry Sambrooke Leigh (1837–1883), English writer and playwright
