= Dale White =

Dale White may refer to:

- Dale White (footballer) (born 1968), English footballer
- Dale R. White (born c. 1971), United States Air Force general
- Tim White (newscaster) (Dale Timothy White), American news anchor and investigative reporter
- Dale White, pen name of Marian T. Place (1910–2006), American author
