= Fairview, Illinois =

- Village
- Location of Fairview in Fulton County, Illinois.

- Location of Illinois in the United States
- Coordinates: 40°38′54″N 90°11′03″W
- Country: United States
- State: Illinois
- County: Fulton
- Township: Fairview

Government
  - Mayor: Tim Harris

Area
  - Total: 4.29 sq mi (11.11 km^{2})
  - Land: 4.22 sq mi (10.92 km^{2})
  - Water: 0.073 sq mi (0.19 km^{2})
- Elevation: 728 ft (222 m)

Population (2020)
  - Total: 426
  - Density: 101.1/sq mi (39.03/km^{2})
- Time zone: UTC-6 (CST)
  - Summer (DST): UTC-5 (CDT)
- ZIP code: 61432
- Area code: 309
- FIPS code: 17-25063
- GNIS ID: 2398859
- Wikimedia Commons: Fairview, Illinois

Fairview is a village in Fulton County, Illinois, United States. The population was 426 at the 2020 census.

== Geography ==
Fairview is located in northern Fulton County. Illinois Route 97 runs along the eastern side of the village, leading north 28 miles (45 km) to Galesburg and south 20 miles (32 km) to Lewistown, the Fulton County seat. Canton, the largest city in Fulton County, is 10 miles (16 km) to the southeast.

According to the 2021 census gazetteer files, Fairview has a total area of 4.29 square miles (11.11 km^{2}), of which 4.22 square miles (10.93 km^{2}) (or 98.27%) is land and 0.07 square miles (0.18 km^{2}) (or 1.73%) is water.

== Demographics ==
Historical population
Census	Pop.	Note	%±
1880	394		—
1890	492		24.9%
1900	501		1.8%
1910	482		−3.8%
1920	572		18.7%
1930	522		−8.7%
1940	528		1.1%
1950	568		7.6%
1960	544		−4.2%
1970	601		10.5%
1980	594		−1.2%
1990	510		−14.1%
2000	493		−3.3%
2010	522		5.9%
2020	426		−18.4%
U.S. Decennial Census

As of the 2020 census there were 426 people, 211 households, and 111 families residing in the village. The population density was 99.32 inhabitants per square mile (38.35/km^{2}). There were 199 housing units at an average density of 46.40 per square mile (17.92/km^{2}). The racial makeup of the village was 97.18% White, 0.00% African American, 0.00% Native American, 0.47% Asian, 0.00% Pacific Islander, 0.70% from other races, and 1.64% from two or more races. Hispanic or Latino of any race were 1.64% of the population.

There were 211 households, out of which 19.0% had children under the age of 18 living with them, 47.39% were married couples living together, 5.21% had a female householder with no husband present, and 47.39% were non-families. 36.97% of all households were made up of individuals, and 13.27% had someone living alone who was 65 years of age or older. The average household size was 2.81 and the average family size was 2.16.

The village's age distribution consisted of 14.5% under the age of 18, 11.4% from 18 to 24, 18.2% from 25 to 44, 32.6% from 45 to 64, and 23.2% who were 65 years of age or older. The median age was 46.5 years. For every 100 females, there were 79.5 males. For every 100 females age 18 and over, there were 81.4 males.

The median income for a household in the village was $57,292, and the median income for a family was $76,875. Males had a median income of $43,472 versus $40,972 for females. The per capita income for the village was $33,033. About 2.7% of families and 6.4% of the population were below the poverty line, including 12.1% of those under age 18 and 7.5% of those age 65 or over.

== Government ==
The town is governed by the Village Board led by Mayor Tim Harris.
