= Excelsior Geyser =

Dormant fountain-type geyser in the Midway Geyser Basin of Yellowstone National Park

Excelsior Geyser Crater
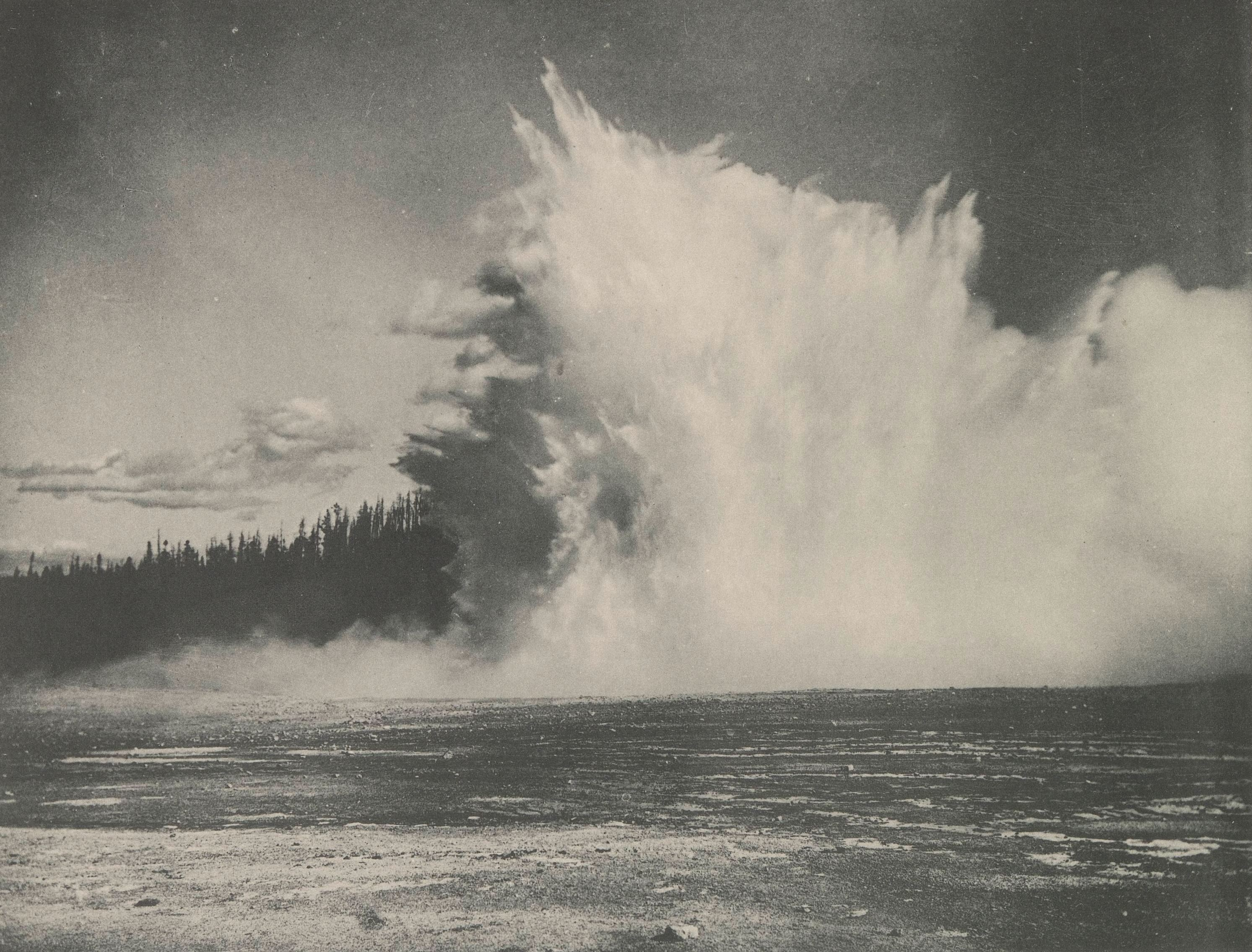
- Eruption, 1888 by F. Jay Haynes
- Interactive map of Excelsior Geyser Crater
- Name origin: Yellowstone superintendent P. W. Norris, 1881
- Location: Midway Geyser Basin, Yellowstone National Park, Teton County, Wyoming
- Coordinates: 44°31′35″N 110°50′13″W
- Elevation: 7,257 feet (2,212 m)
- Type: Fountain-type Geyser
- Eruption height: Boil – 300 feet, and just as wide.
- Frequency: When it was active, 75 minutes to 2 or more hours (1880s)
- Duration: When it was active, 4-10 minutes (1880s)
- Discharge: 4,000–4,050 gallons per minute – when not erupting
- Temperature: 199 °F (93 °C)

Excelsior Geyser Crater, formerly known as Excelsior Geyser, is a dormant fountain-type geyser in the Midway Geyser Basin of Yellowstone National Park in the United States. Excelsior was named by Yellowstone superintendent P. W. Norris in 1881.

== Description ==
The Excelsior Geyser pool discharges 4,000 to 4,500 gallons (15,100–17,000 L) of 199 °F (93 °C) water per minute directly into the Firehole River. In the late 19th century (and possibly 1901), it was an active geyser that erupted frequently. Most eruptions were about 100 feet high, although some exceeded 300 feet (91 m) in both height and width. It now boils as a productive hot spring most of the time.

== Activity ==
Excelsior goes through periods of activity and inactivity. It was initially reported in 1869 as a large crater with a pool that had evidence of eruptions, but none were seen until 1881. Superintendent P. W. Norris describes the 1881 eruptions as:

"...simply incredible, elevating to heights of from 100 to 300 feet sufficient water to render the rapid Fire Hole River, nearly 100 yards wide, a foaming torrent of steaming hot water, and hurling rocks of from 1 to 100 pounds weight, like those from an exploded mine, over surrounding acres."

Excelsior was mostly dormant after 1881 until dramatic eruptions began in the spring of 1888. Photographers F. Jay Haynes and T. W. Ingersoll made photographs of Excelsior, capturing the power and violence of these eruptions

By the end of 1888, it had been reported as "extinct". An expedition by the U.S. Fish Commission in the summer of 1890 found that it had become an active geyser that erupted frequently, but this active period soon ended. It is believed that the powerful eruptions broke off sections of stone that damaged its internal plumbing system.

In 1985, Excelsior returned to activity for a 46-hour period from September 14 to 16. These eruptions were relatively small, at 30 feet (9.1 m), but a few were as much as 80 feet (24 m) tall and 100 feet (30 m) wide. All of these eruptions lasted about 2 minutes at intervals of 5 to 66 minutes.

Between 2004 and 2006, Excelsior had violent boiling strong enough to be considered eruptions. This boiling reached between 5 and 10 feet (1.5 and 3.0 m) and had a duration of seconds.

Images of Excelsior Geyser

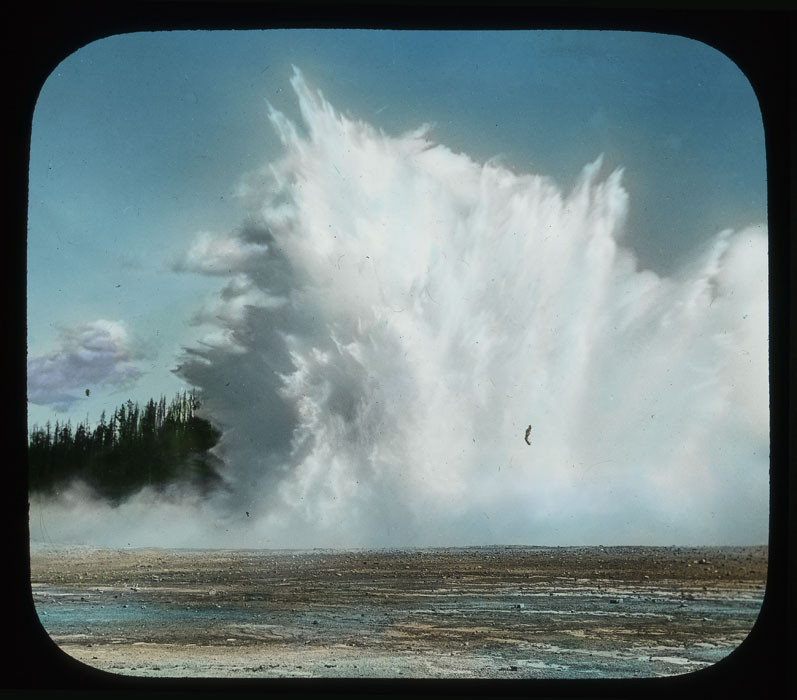
F. Jay Haynes photo

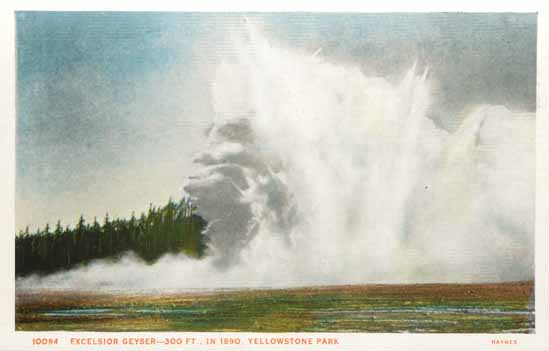
Postcard after F. Jay Haynes photo

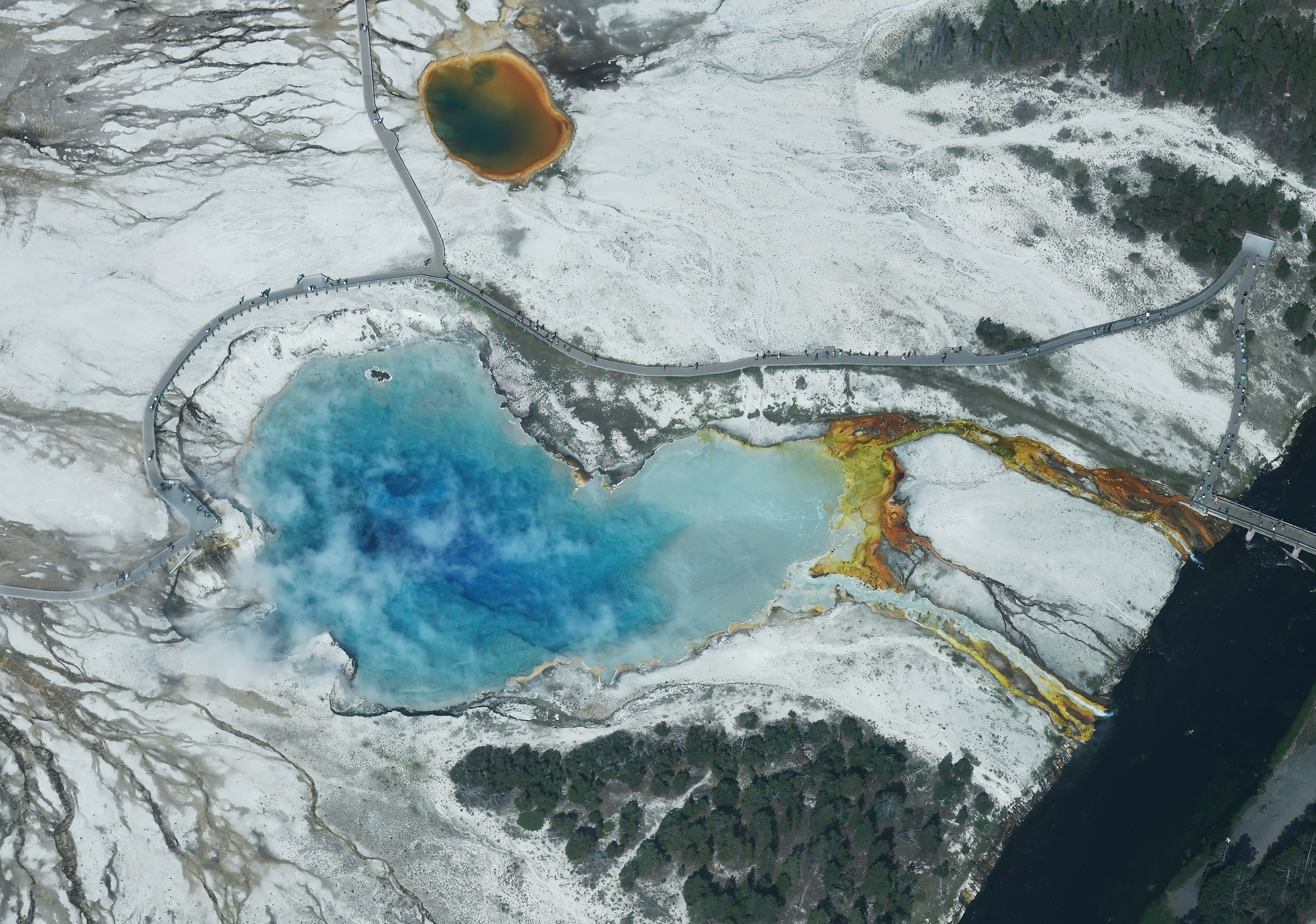
Aerial view of the Excelsior Geyser crater

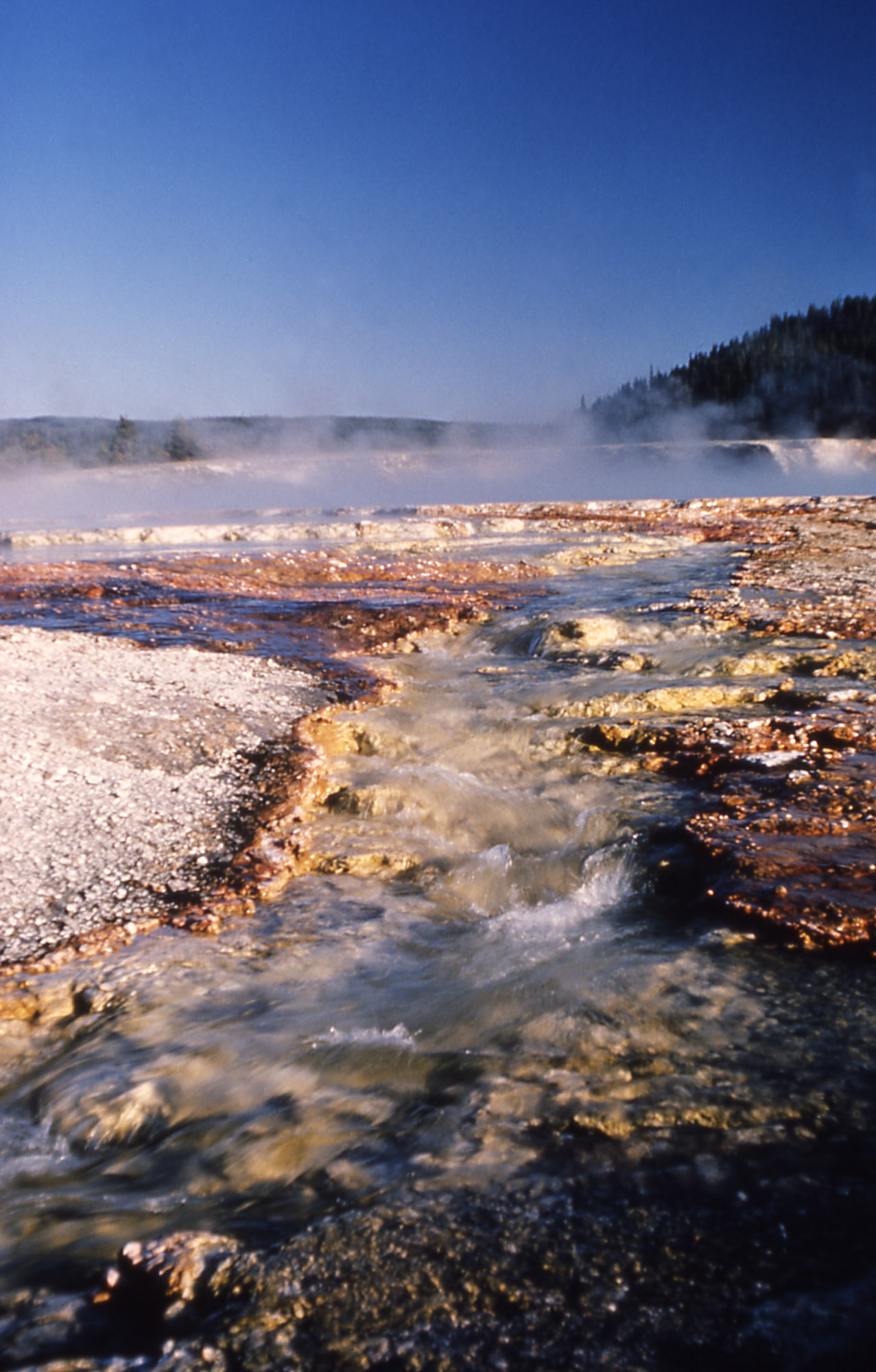
The pool and runoff from the Excelsior Geyser crater

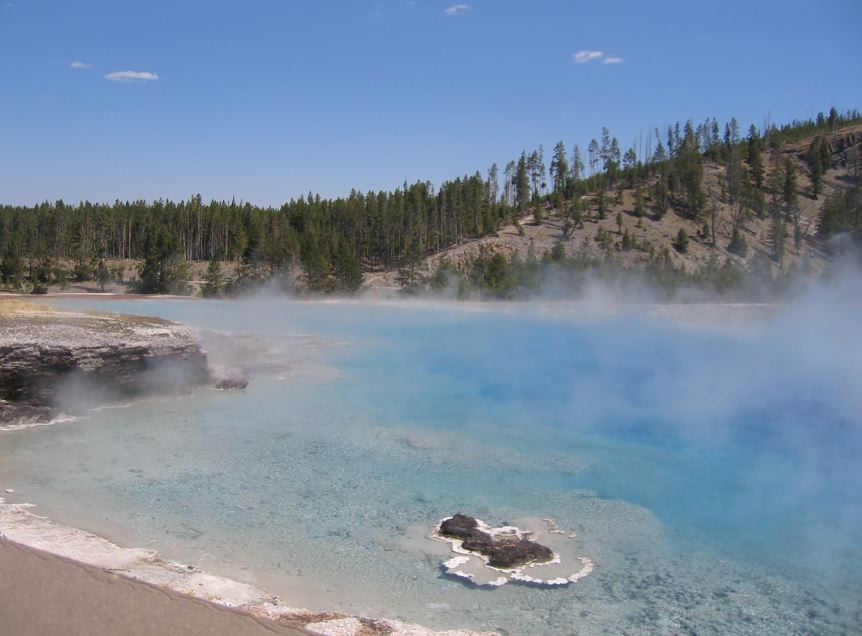
Excelsior Geyser crater

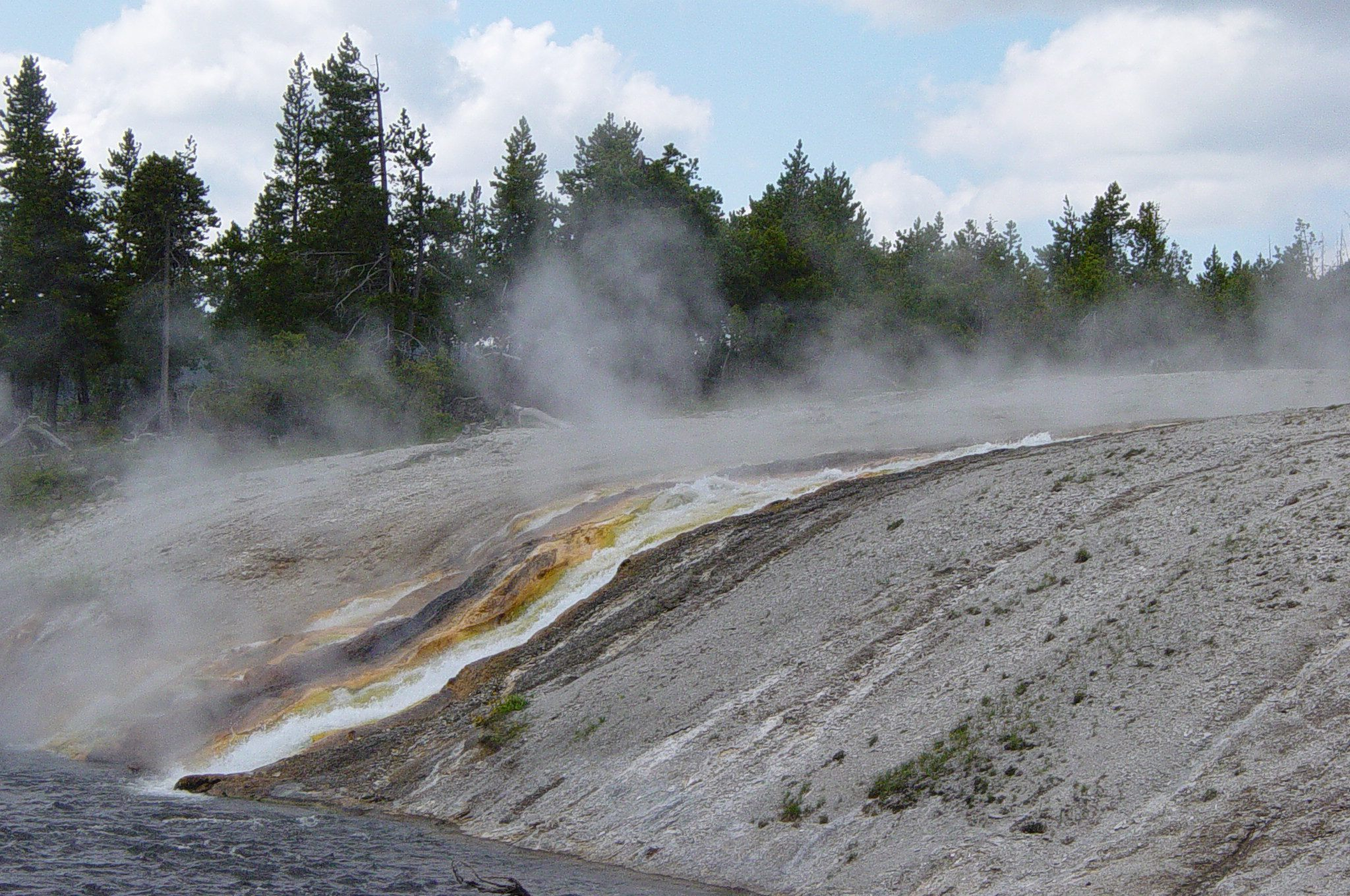
Runoff into Firehole River

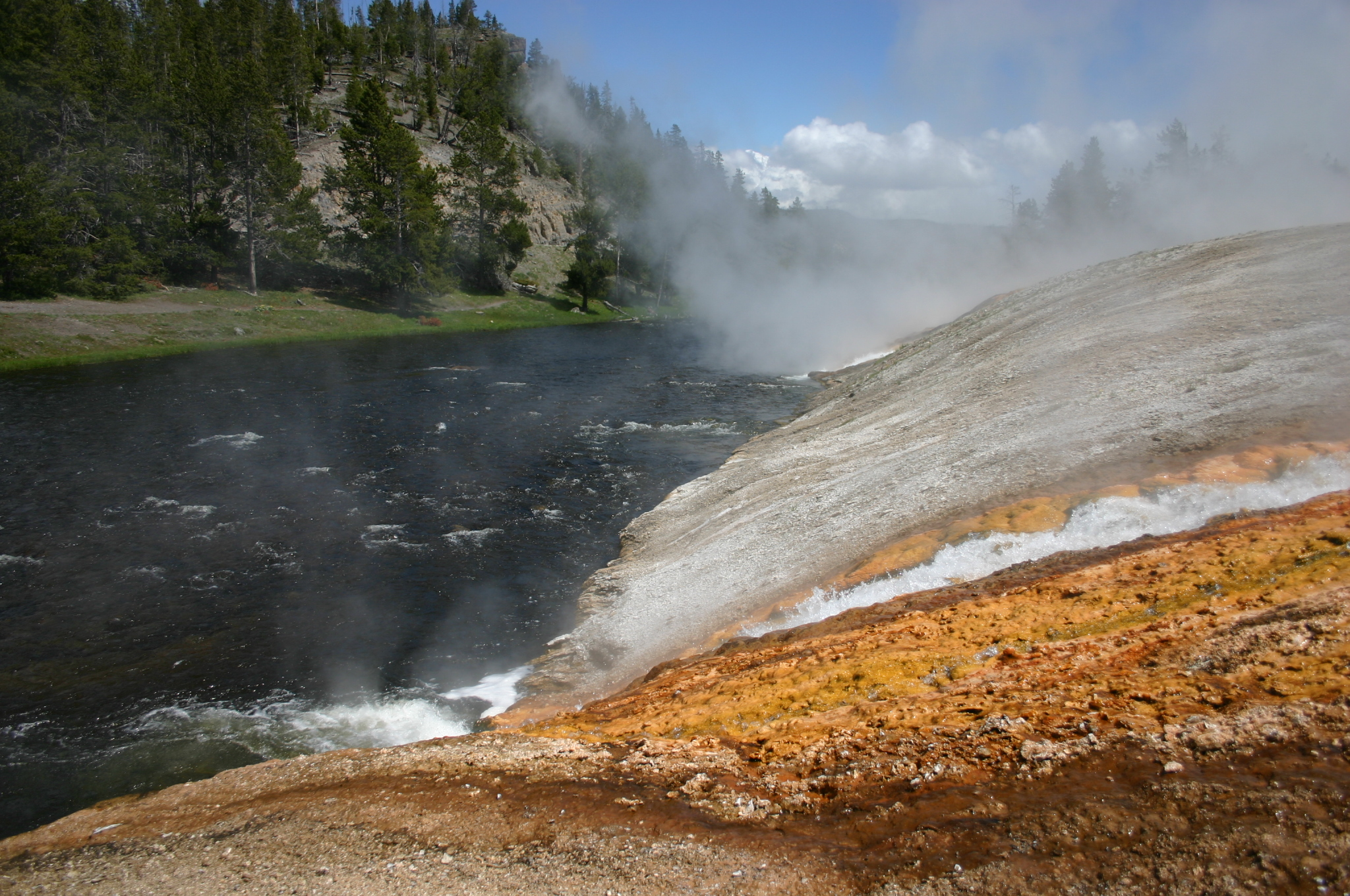
Runoff into Firehole River
