= Pemberton =

Pemberton may refer to:

== People ==
- Pemberton (surname)

== Places ==
Pemberton is the name of several places:

=== Australia ===
- Pemberton, Queensland, a neighbourhood in Windemere in the Bundaberg Region
- Pemberton, Western Australia

=== Canada ===
- Pemberton, British Columbia
- Pemberton Valley, a name for the valley along the Lillooet River in British Columbia that includes the community
- Pemberton Volcanic Belt

=== United Kingdom ===
- Pemberton, Greater Manchester, a residential area of Wigan
  - Pemberton (ward), an electoral ward of the Wigan Metropolitan Borough Council
- Pemberton, Carmarthenshire

=== United States ===
- Pemberton, Minnesota
- Pemberton, New Jersey
- Pemberton, Ohio
- Pemberton Heights, New Jersey
- Pemberton Mill, Lawrence, Massachusetts
- Pemberton Point, Hull, Massachusetts
- Pemberton Township, New Jersey

== See also ==
- Pemberton v. Tallahassee Memorial Regional Center
- Pemberton Music Festival
- Pemberton Festival
