= Richard Leigh Jr =

English cricketer (1794–1841)

- Born: 7 February 1784; Wilmington, Kent
- Died: 9 October 1841 (aged 57); Westminster

Richard Leigh Jr (born 7 February 1784 at Wilmington, near Dartford, Kent; died 9 October 1841 at Westminster) was an English amateur cricketer who was mainly associated with Surrey. He made five known appearances from 1806 to 1809. His father, also called Richard Leigh, was a well-known match promoter in the 1790s, and there were nine matches featuring R. Leigh's XI.

== Bibliography ==
- Carlaw, Derek (2020). Kent County Cricketers, A to Z: Part One (1806–1914) (PDF). Cardiff: ACS.
