= Eva Leigh =

American author

Eva Leigh is an American author of erotica and historical romantic fiction. Her novels have a theme of women's empowerment.

Her novel My Fake Rake was reviewed favorably by NPR for upending the literary trope of women getting makeovers. The book depicts a scientist struggling to convince others that it is acceptable for women to have careers. How the Wallflower Was Won was reviewed positively by Paste Magazine for how it showed a "marriage of convenience between a bluestocking and a rogue" A short story by Leigh was included in Best Women's Erotica of the Year in 2022 by Simon & Schuster.

Leigh is outspoken in support of legalized abortion in the US, saying she feels obligated to speak up as a romance novelist because "making decisions about whether you have a choice about the course of your life" is a central theme in the genre.

== Awards and reception ==
- 2021 - New York Public Library Best Books for Adults 2021 – Waiting for a Scot Like You
