= J. Paul Leigh =

American economist

J. Paul Leigh is an American economist and professor of health economics in the Department of Public Health Sciences at the University of California, Davis. He is also a member of the Center for Healthcare Policy and Research's core faculty there. He is known for his research in the fields of health economics, labor economics, and econometrics. For instance, he has studied the costs of occupational injuries.
