= John Leigh-Pemberton =

British artist and illustrator

John Loftus Leigh-Pemberton AFC (1911–1997) was an artist and illustrator from the United Kingdom, best known for his book illustrations.

== Life and work ==
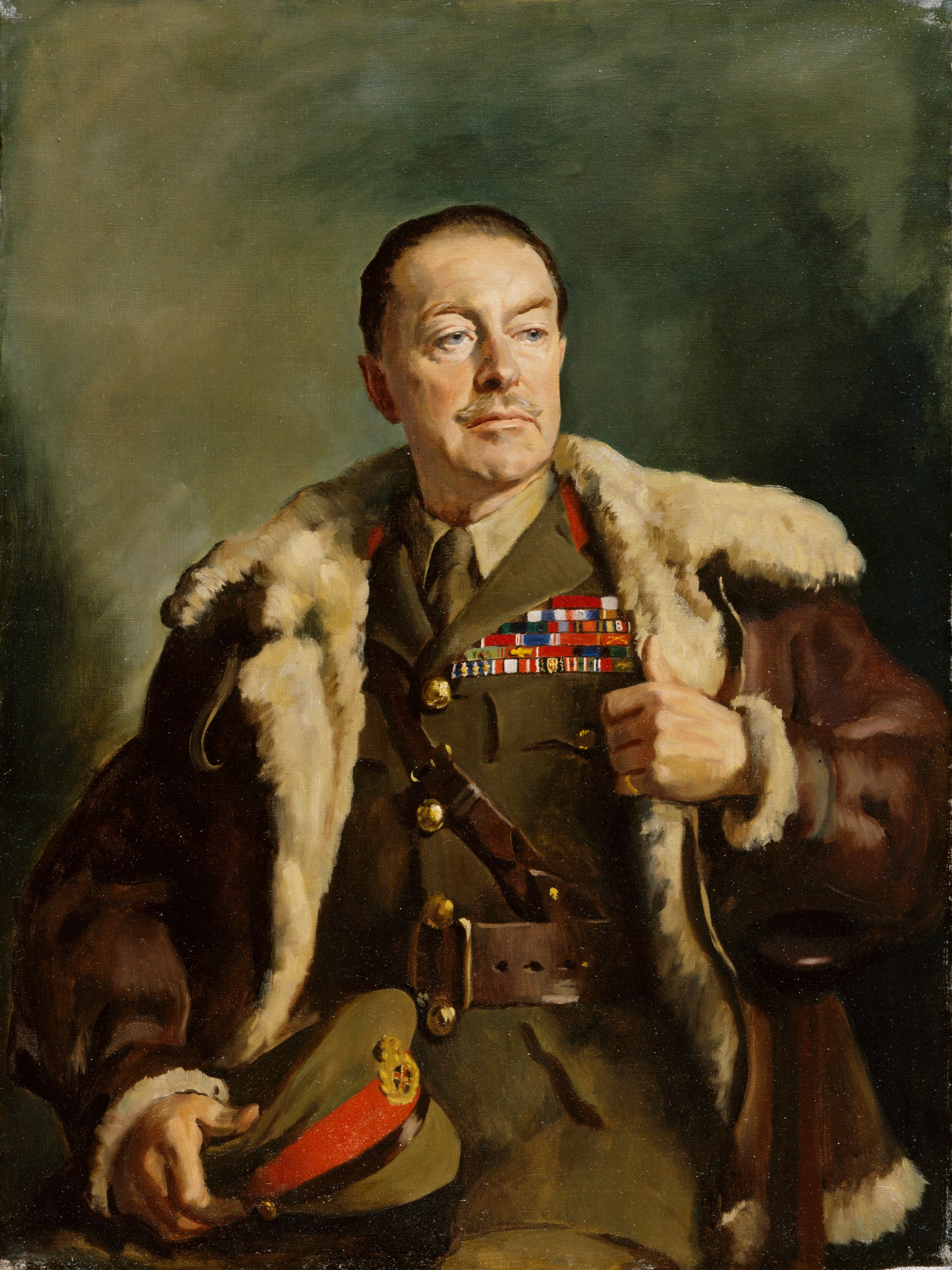
Leigh-Pemberton's copy, now in the Imperial War Museum, of a portrait by Sir Oswald Birley.

Leigh-Pemberton was the great-grandson of Edward Leigh Pemberton. He was born on 18 October 1911 and was educated at Eton; he studied art in London between 1928 and 1932. During the Second World War he was a flying instructor for the RAF and was awarded the Air Force Cross in 1945. As well as his book illustrations, Leigh-Pemberton carried out advertising work and decorated a number of ships. He also did work for the Shell Guides series. However perhaps his best-known work was carried out for the Ladybird series of books for children, where he wrote and illustrated many of the series dealing with natural history subjects.
