= Richard Leigh (cricket patron) =

English businessman and cricket patron

Richard Leigh Sr (dates unknown) was an 18th-century English businessman and cricket patron who ran his own team, R. Leigh's XI, which is known to have played in nine historically important matches between 1793 and 1795. (Note: Any match listed in the ACS' Important Match Guide (1981) is historically important, and therefore of the highest standard, whether or not a scorecard might exist. The same applies to numerous matches discovered by researchers since 1981. For further information, see First-class cricket.) (Note: Scorecard data till at least 1825 was never comprehensive, especially the dismissal information: bowling analyses lacked balls bowled and runs conceded; bowlers were not credited with wickets when the batsman was caught or stumped; in many matches, the means of dismissal were omitted.) His son, Richard Leigh Jr, played in the 1800s, but there is no record of Leigh Sr having done so.

== Life ==
Leigh Sr, who resided at Wilmington, near Dartford, was an elected (1793) member of the Hambledon Club and also an early member of the Marylebone Cricket Club (MCC). He was such a prominent match organiser in the 1790s that the Duchess of Gordon reportedly said to him: "Though I am the first, you are the second match-maker in England, Mr Leigh".

Leigh Sr was the father of the 1800s Kent player Richard Leigh Jr, but it is not known if Leigh Sr was ever a player himself.

== R. Leigh's XI ==
R. Leigh's XI was a scratch team formed by Leigh Sr, which is known to have played in nine important matches from 1793 to 1795, all of them against other scratch teams organised by rival patrons.

== Bibliography ==
- ACS (1981). A Guide to Important Cricket Matches Played in the British Isles 1709–1863. Nottingham: ACS. OCLC 85045528.
- Ashley-Cooper, F. S. (1924). Hambledon Cricket Chronicle: 1772–1796. London: Jenkins. OCLC 38498574.
- Carlaw, Derek (2020). Kent County Cricketers, A to Z: Part One (1806–1914) (PDF). Cardiff: ACS.
- Haygarth, Arthur (1997) [1862]. Scores & Biographies, Volume 2 (1827–1840). Kennington: Frederick Lillywhite. ISBN 978-19-00592-23-9.
- Webber, Roy (1951). The Playfair Book of Cricket Records. London: Playfair Books Ltd. OCLC 753176177.
