= Carolyn Leigh (artist) =

Carolyn Leigh (born 1945) is an American artist, author, and art dealer based in Tucson, Arizona. She works in mixed media, primarily working in paints, prints, and book art, and is influenced by the art of Papua New Guinea, Sonora, Mexico, and Arizona.

== Biography ==
Carolyn Leigh Fulton was born in 1945 in Wichita, Kansas to Dr. Albert Edwin Fulton and Faye Fulton. She attended Wichita State University and received a Bachelor of Arts degree in English Literature, with a minor in Anthropology in 1967.

She married Douglas W. Shakel, a geologist, and followed him to Tucson. They were married from 1967-76. While there, she worked as a scientific illustrator and photography instructor at the University of Arizona.

In 1985, she met husband Ron Perry, who deals in tribal arts from Papua New Guinea, and accompanied him on his travels. They were married in 1991.

They currently exhibit and sell tribal art from Papua New Guinea and Indonesia with partner Doug Mehaffey from their Tucson home.

== Work ==
Leigh's work uses intense colors and are often influenced by the architecture of the areas she's lived and traveled, such as the urban streets and neighborhoods of Alamos, where she and her husband had a home for many years. She was also inspired by the colors of Rufino Tamayo.

=== Selected exhibitions and examples ===
- Vamp & Tramp Booksellers: Art Books series, Carolyn Leigh
- 2009 Tempe Center for the Arts "2008 Biennial: Paper." House of Cards
- 2010 University of Arizona Art Museum. "Sculptural Desire: Memory and Desire."
- 2010 Museum of Contemporary Art Tucson. "Made in Tucson, Born in Tucson, Live in Tucson Part 1" - aeries cycle (1973-1978
- 2013 birds of spring - pájaros de primavera, abecedarian gallery, Denver, CO
