= Jacob Leigh =

British film scholar (born 1967)

- Born: 10 May 1967 (age 59)
- Occupation: Film scholar

Academic work
- Discipline: Film studies
- Institutions: Royal Holloway, University of London
- Notable works: The Cinema of Ken Loach (2002); The Cinema of Eric Rohmer (2012); The Late Films of Claude Chabrol (2017); Contemporary Directors' Cinema (2024)
- Website: bloomsbury.com

Jacob Leigh (born 10 May 1967) is a British film studies scholar. He is a senior lecturer at Royal Holloway, University of London.

Leigh obtained a PhD degree on a thesis about themes and style in Ken Loach's films, which also was the subject of his first book, The Cinema of Ken Loach from 2002. In 2012, he published a book about the filmmaker Éric Rohmer, The Cinema of Eric Rohmer.

== Selected publications ==
- The Cinema of Ken Loach: Art in the Service of the People (2002)
- The Cinema of Eric Rohmer: Irony, Imagination, and the Social World (2012)
- The Late Films of Claude Chabrol: Genre, Visual Expressionism and Narrational Ambiguity (2017)
- Contemporary Directors' Cinema (2024)
