= Frank Jay Haynes =

American photographer (1853–1921)

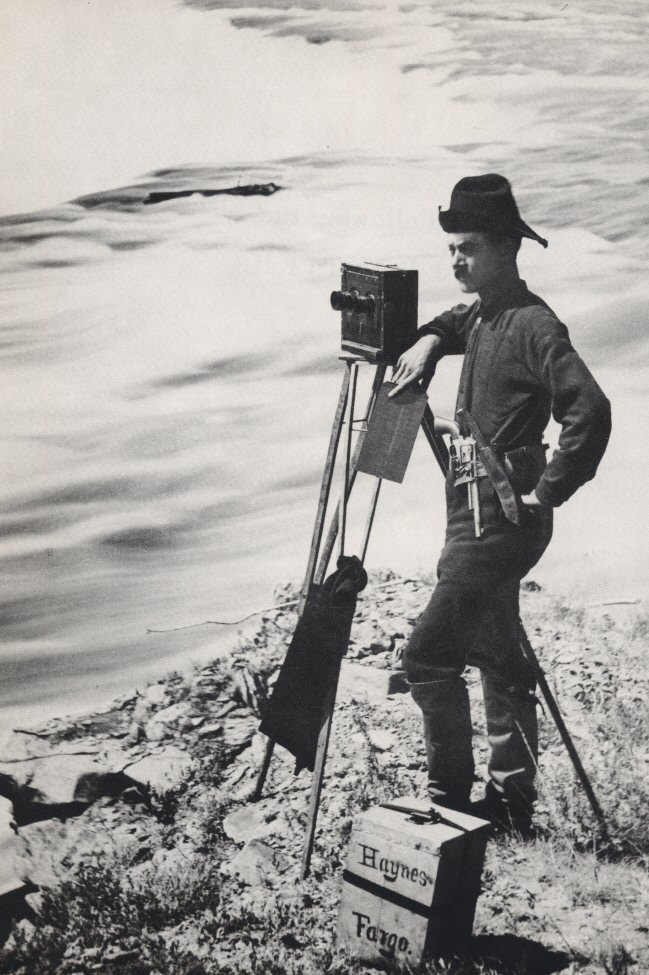
- F. Jay Haynes, 1880
- Born: October 28, 1853; Saline, Michigan
- Died: March 10, 1921 (aged 67); St. Paul, Minnesota
- Resting place: Roselawn Cemetery, Roselawn, Minnesota; 44.9972°N 93.13817°W
- Other name: F. J. Haynes
- Occupation: Photographer
- Spouse: Lily Verna Snyder
- Children: Jack Ellis Haynes
- Parent: Levi H. Haynes

Frank Jay Haynes (October 28, 1853 – March 10, 1921), also known as F. Jay, was a professional photographer, publisher, and entrepreneur from Minnesota who played a major role in documenting through photographs the settlement and early history of the Northwestern United States. He became both the official photographer of the Northern Pacific Railway and of Yellowstone National Park as well as operating early transportation concessions in the park. His photographs were widely published in articles, journals, and books, and turned into stereographs and postcards in the late 19th and early 20th century.

== Early life ==
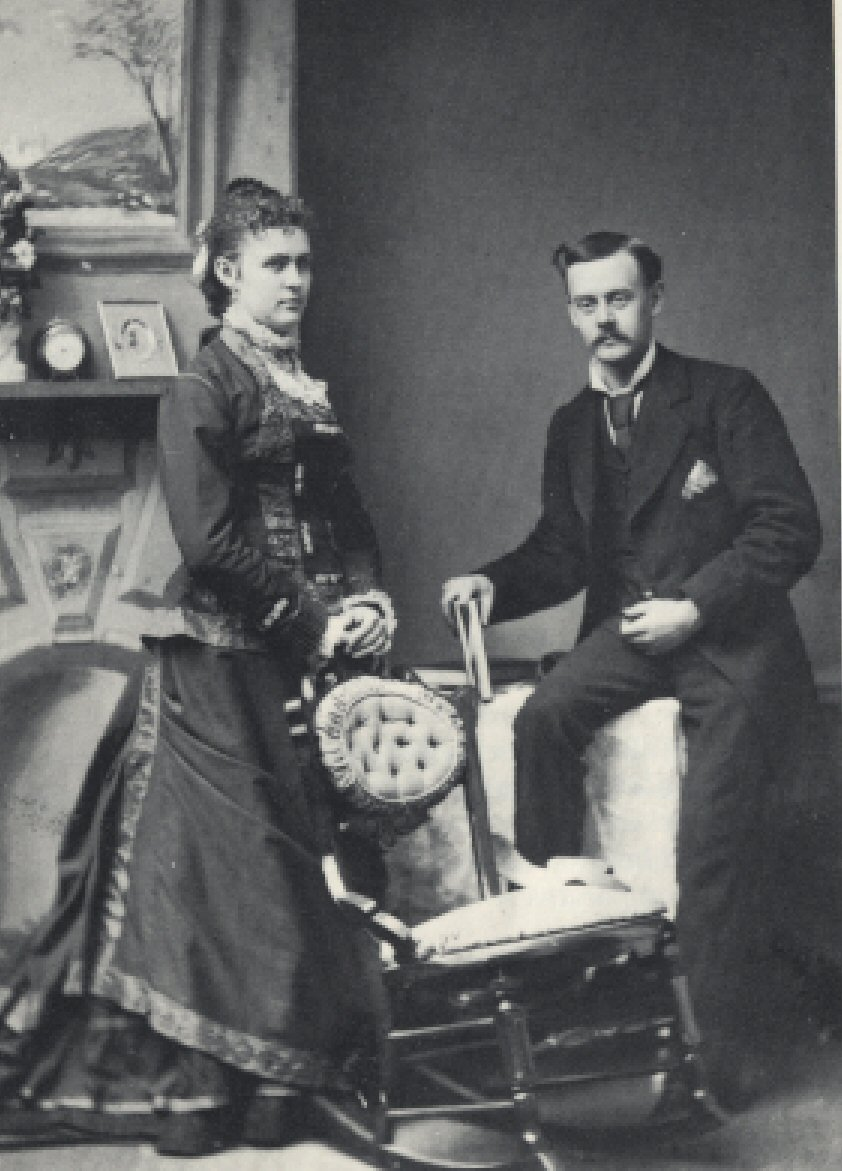
Lily Snyder and F. Jay, January 1878

F. Jay was born in Saline, Michigan, on October 28, 1853, to Levi H. Haynes, a merchant and Caroline Oliphant. When he was a small boy, the family moved east to Detroit, Michigan. F. Jay worked in his father's store and took various other odd jobs. As a boy, he visited the photographic studios of Mrs. Gillette in Detroit and became interested in photography. After several traveling salesman jobs, F. Jay ended up in Ripon, Wisconsin, and secured a position as an apprentice in the Doctor William H. Lockwood's Temple of Photography. He worked for Lockwood for 16 months, learned the photography trade and met his future wife, a co-worker, Lily Snyder. In September 1876, F. Jay left the Lockwood Studio to start his own photographic business in Moorhead, Minnesota, with the backing of his brother-in-law, Gus Henderson.

It was in Moorhead that F. Jay began his long and prosperous relationship with the Northern Pacific Railway. A year later, F. Jay's business was booming in Moorhead, and in January 1878, he married Lily Snyder in Ripon and brought her to Moorhead to help with the business. They had a daughter, Bessie Loa, and two sons, George and Jack Ellis. Jack Ellis Haynes inherited his father's business in Yellowstone in 1916 and continued as official park photographer until his death in 1962.

== Haynes Studios ==
=== Moorhead, Minnesota ===
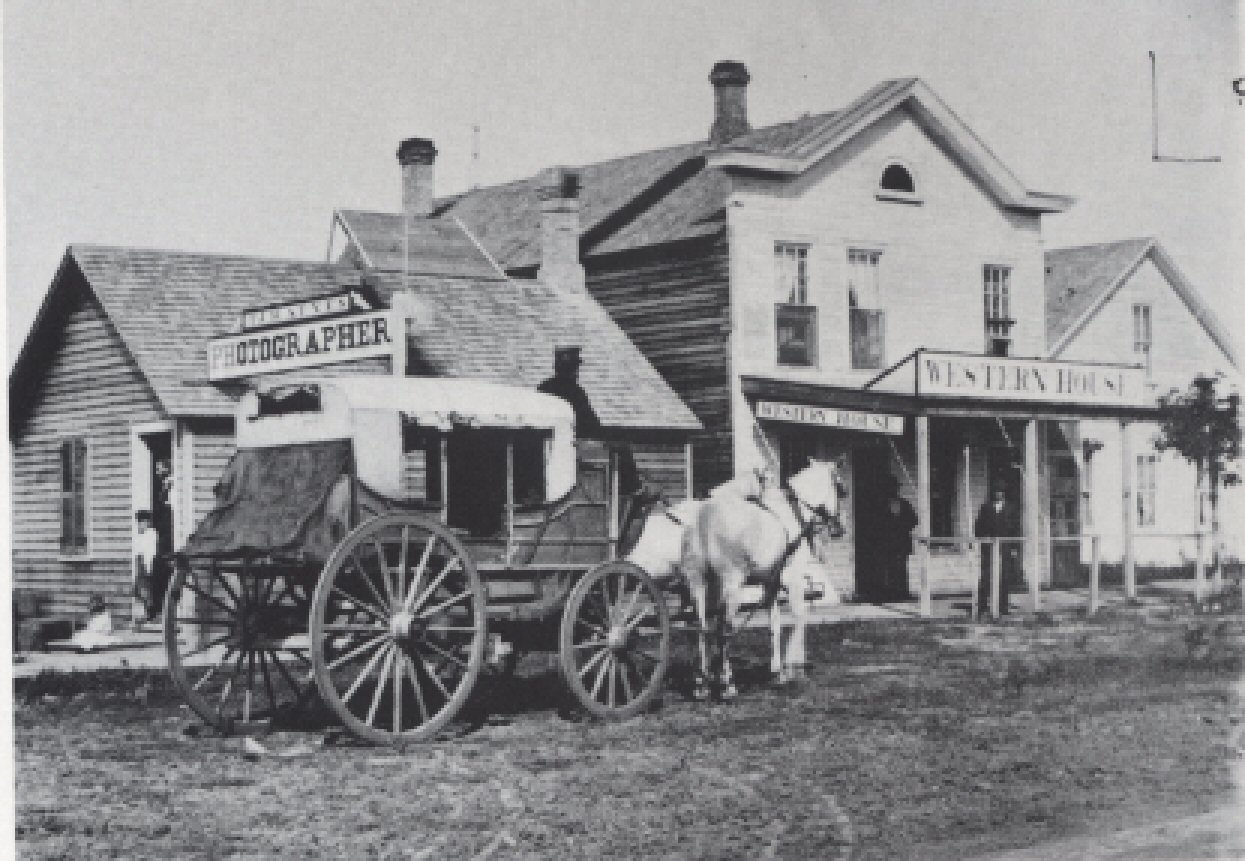
First Haynes Studio, Moorhead, MN, December 1876

The first Haynes Studio was established in Moorhead, Minnesota in December 1876. From this studio, F. Jay was able to build on his railroad business with the sales of local cabinet portraits, views and stereoviews of his railroad photographs. By early 1879, F. Jay had relocated his Moorhead studio to a much larger facility. However, in the fall of 1879, F. Jay closed his Moorhead studio and moved west across the Red River to Fargo, North Dakota, where he lived until 1889.

=== St. Paul, Minnesota ===
In 1889, F. Jay established his final studio in Saint Paul, Minnesota.

=== Haynes Palace Studio Car ===
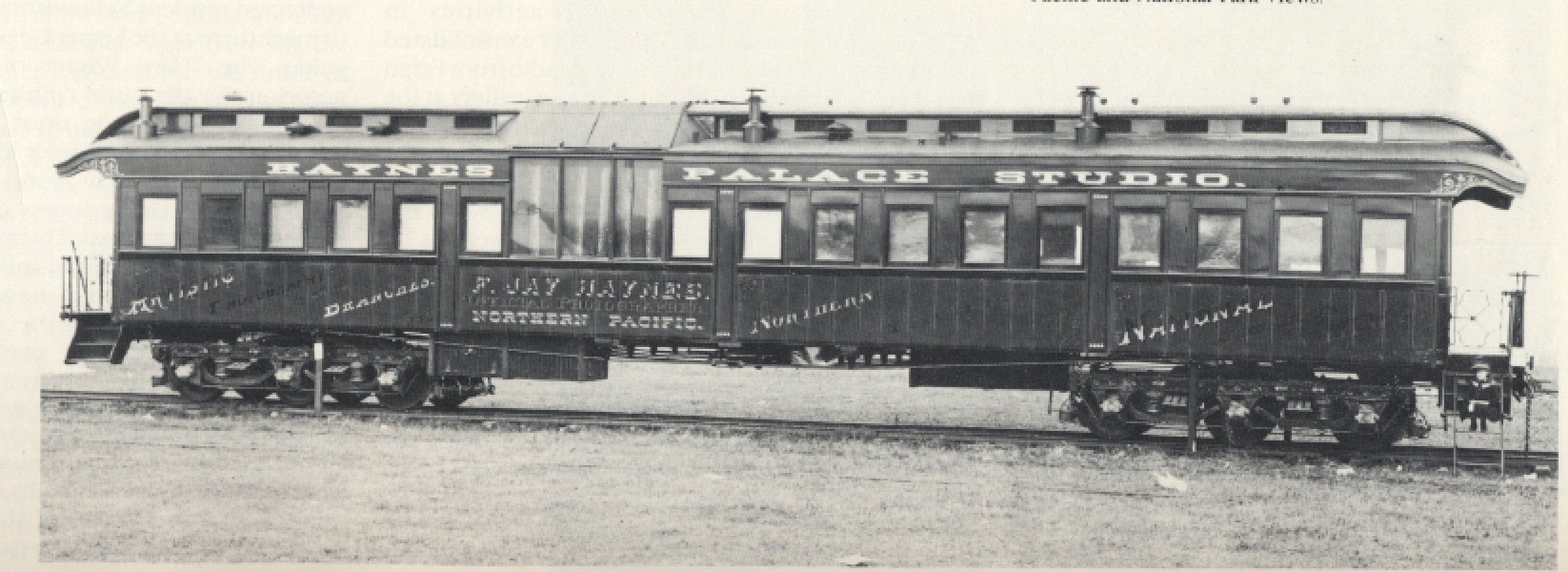
Haynes Palace Studio Car, 1901

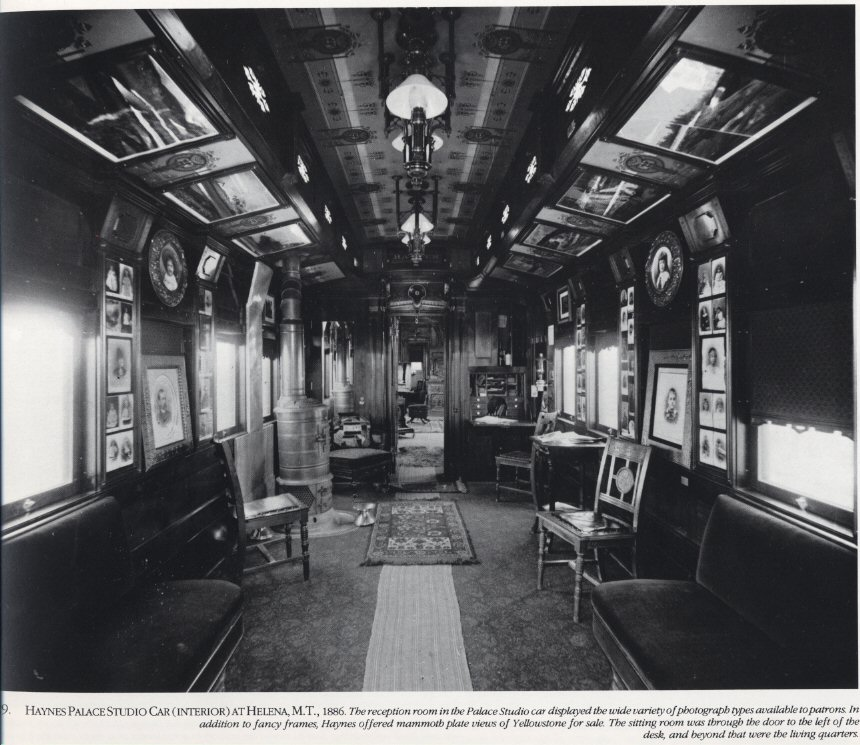
Interior of Haynes Palace Studio Car, 1886

In 1885, F. Jay bought a Pullman car from the Northern Pacific Railway and had it refitted as a photographic studio. The railway charged F. Jay a nominal fee to haul the car around the railroad system. In 1901, the fee was $.35/mile contingent on F. Jay providing the railroad with a nominal number of free photographs of rolling stock and railroad buildings for publicity purposes. Whenever the Palace Studio Car would visit a town, F. Jay or his employees would take photos for local customers and provide them with prints on later visits. F. Jay operated the car successfully between 1885 and 1905.

== Work with Northern Pacific Railway ==
Shortly after his move to Moorhead in 1876, F. Jay began doing photographic work for elements of the Northern Pacific Railway as the railway expanded operations west. By October 1876, he had a contract with the railway for work in the 1877 season. His job was to supply publicity photos and stereoscopic views of rolling stock, depots, sights along the railway and construction activities from Saint Paul, Minnesota, to Bismarck, North Dakota. F. Jay was a good businessman and had arranged with the railway to supply a fixed number of prints (or views) from each negative while he retained the rights to the negatives, from which he could print and sell views for his own benefit. The railway provided F. Jay with a free pass on all their trains from St. Paul to Bismarck. This allowed F. Jay access to all the railway's territory, from which he could photograph anything he wanted to. From his Moorhead studio, F. Jay could hardly keep up with the demand for his Northern Pacific Views and local portrait work.

In 1879, F. Jay met Charles S. Fee, the private secretary to the railway's general manager, Homer E. Sargent. In 1883, Fee became the railway's general passenger and ticket agent responsible for marketing the railroad. It was a position Fee held until 1904. Fee became F. Jay's biggest supporter within the railroad and they became lifelong friends.

== Work with Yellowstone National Park ==
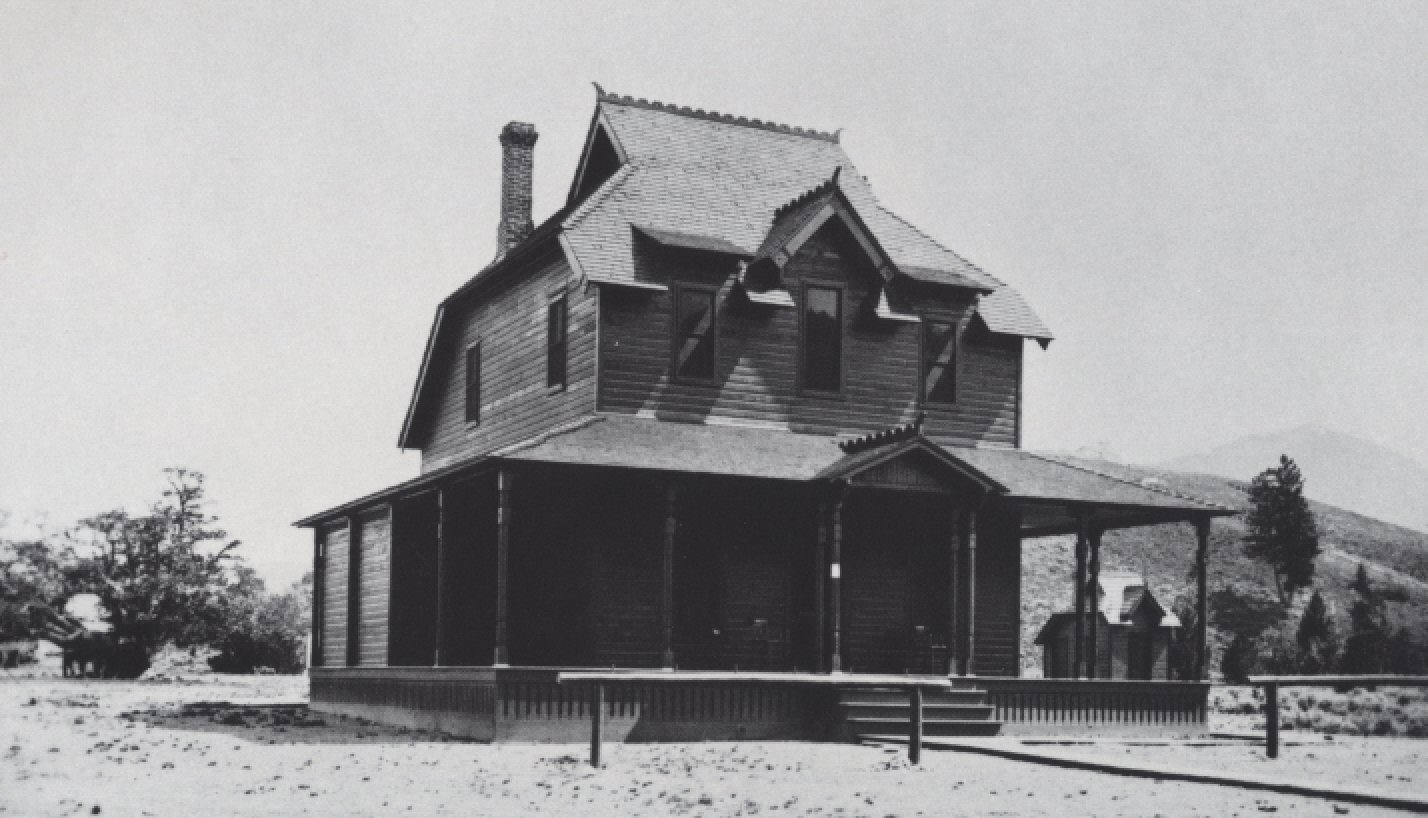
Original Haynes Studio, Mammoth Hot Springs, 1884

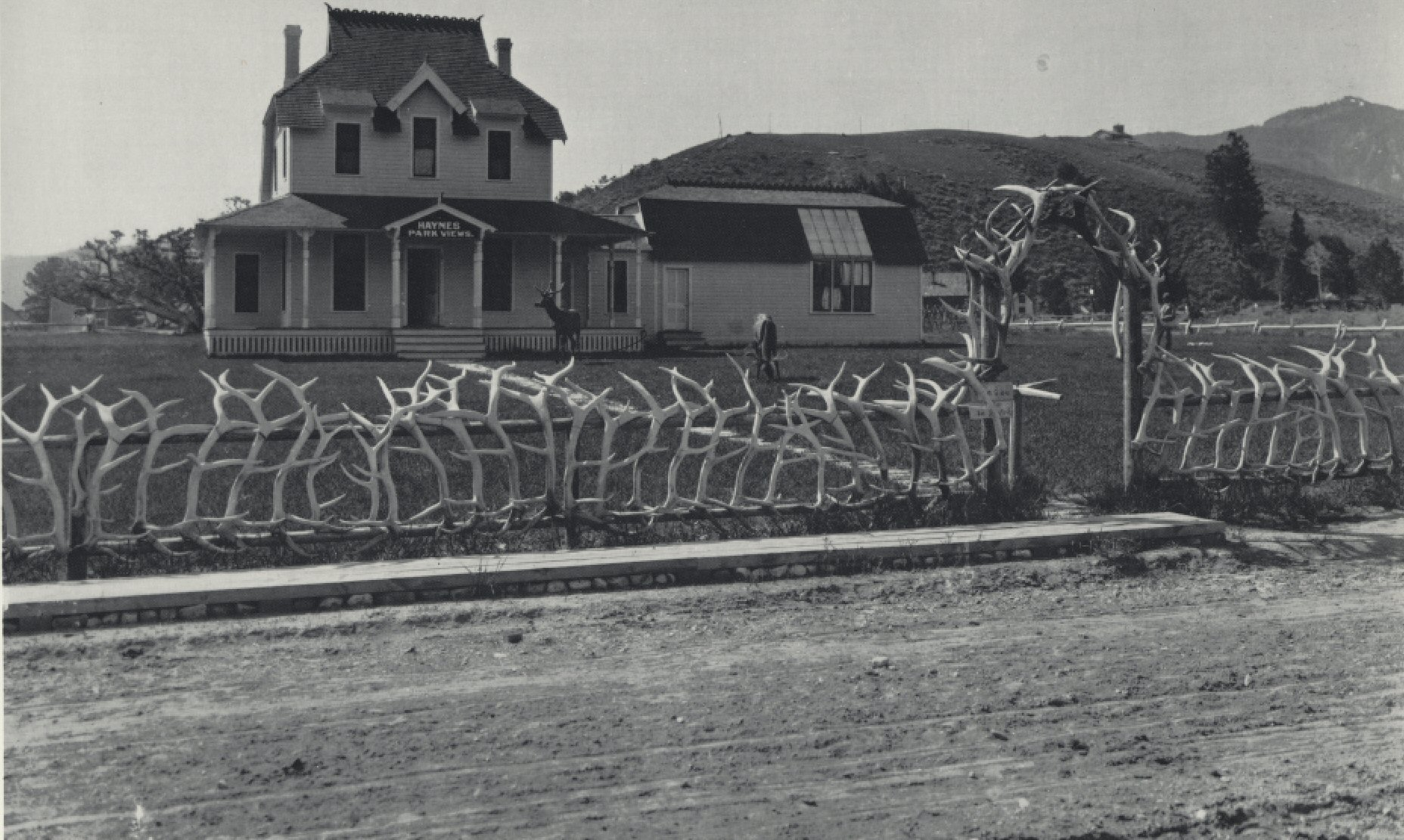
Haynes Studio, Mammoth Hot Springs, 1898

In 1877, F. Jay made the acquaintance of Philetus Norris, then superintendent of Yellowstone National Park. At the time, Norris encouraged F. Jay to visit the park with him and photograph its wonders. Because of his railroad work, F. Jay was unable to make the trip until 1881. By 1881, Northern Pacific Railway tracks had reached Glendive, Montana. Even before visiting the park, F. Jay's knack for business prompted him in early 1881 to apply to the Secretary of the Interior for the position of official photographer of Yellowstone National Park. The Secretary was unable to confer that position, but did, with Norris's backing, grant F. Jay a lease for a small photographic studio within the park along that was not made official until 1884. In September 1881, traveling overland from Glendive, and with explicit support from Charles Fee, F. Jay made his first visit to Yellowstone National Park. In close to two months in the park, he was able to visit all the major attractions and take over 200 photographs. F. Jay returned to Yellowstone every year after that first visit until his death in 1921.

=== President Chester A. Arthur's 1883 expedition to Yellowstone National Park ===
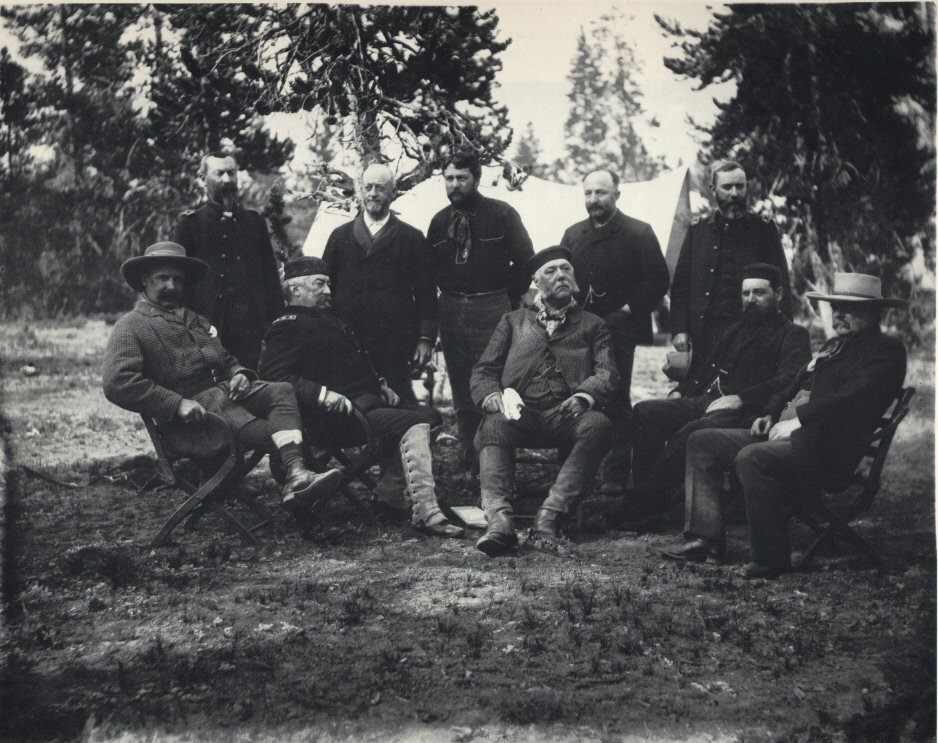
President Chester A. Arthur and party at Old Faithful, 1883

In May 1883, President Chester A. Arthur—under stress from the first years of his unexpected presidency—was encouraged to take a good rest by his advisors. One of those advisors, Senator George Vest of Missouri, suggested a trip to Yellowstone, still a relatively new national park. By early summer, the unusual trip was being arranged. President Arthur would visit the park for two weeks in August, unaccompanied by any journalists. Through his notoriety with the Northern Pacific Railway and early trips to Yellowstone, F. Jay Haynes was selected as the official photographer for the trip.

=== 1887 winter tour ===
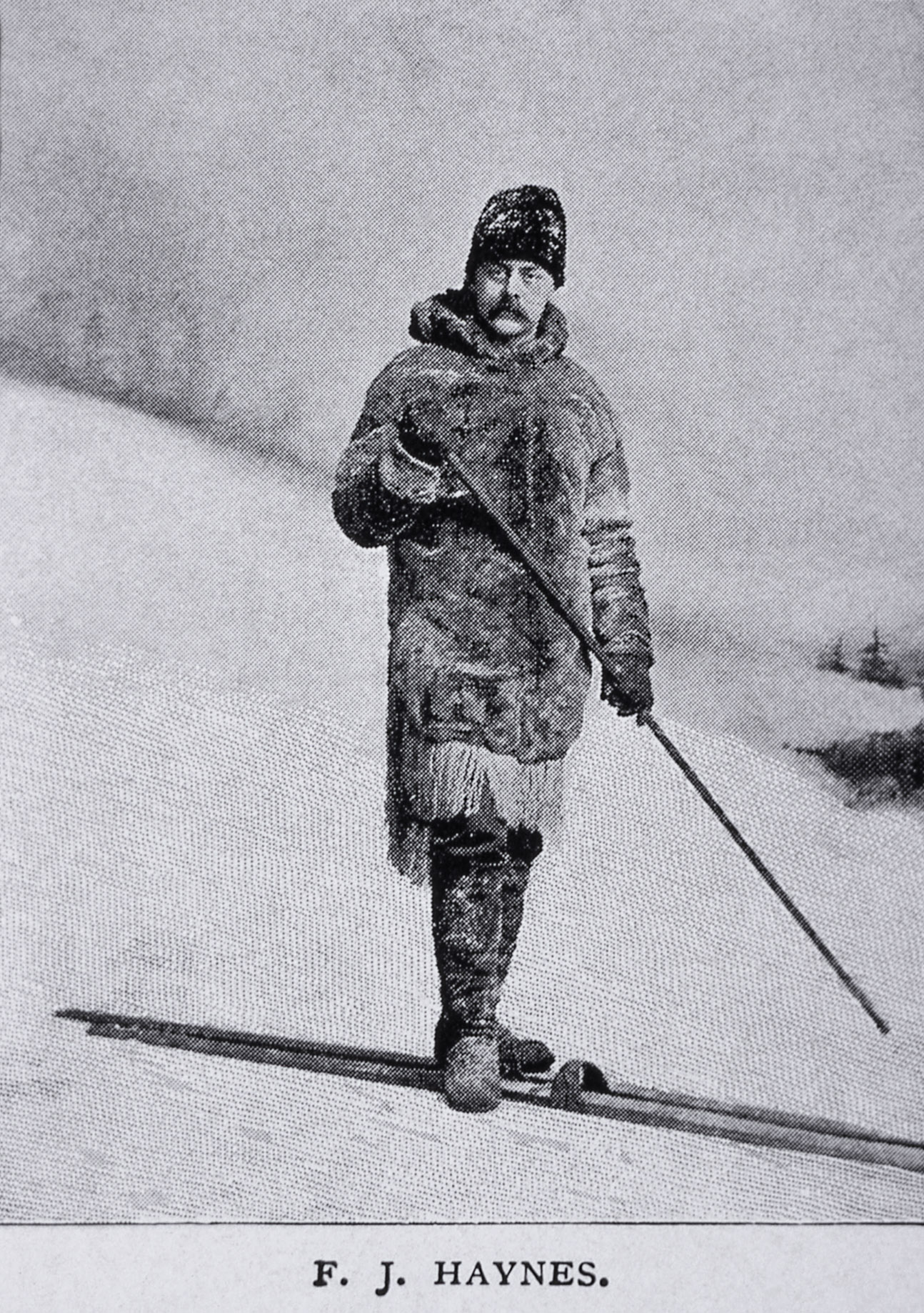
F.J. Haynes during 1887 Winter tour

In December 1886, F. Jay was selected to accompany arctic explorer Frederick Schwatka on a winter tour through the park. The expedition was sponsored by the New York World newspaper and The Century Magazine. The expedition started at Mammoth, Montana, on January 5, 1887. On skis and shoeshoes, pulling sleds laden with gear, Schwatka, F. Jay, and eleven other guides made their way from Mammoth to Norris, Montana, in two days. By the time the group got to Norris, the cold and altitude had gotten to Schwatka and he had to abandon the tour. F. Jay, along with three other guides he knew and could depend on, decided to continue the expedition, visiting the lower and upper geyser basins and Yellowstone Falls before trouble struck. In an attempt to get to Yancey's from Canyon, the party got stranded for 72 hours on the slopes of Mount Washburn in a frigid and blinding snowstorm with little or no food or shelter. They almost perished. Once the weather cleared, they made their way to Yancey's to recuperate before returning to Mammoth. The 29-day tour of the park covered nearly 200 miles through a wintry environment, with temperatures varying from −10 °F (−23 °C) to −52 °F (−47 °C). Despite the problems on Mount Washburn, F. Jay returned with 42 photographs of Yellowstone in the middle of winter, the first ever taken during that time of year.

== Memorials ==
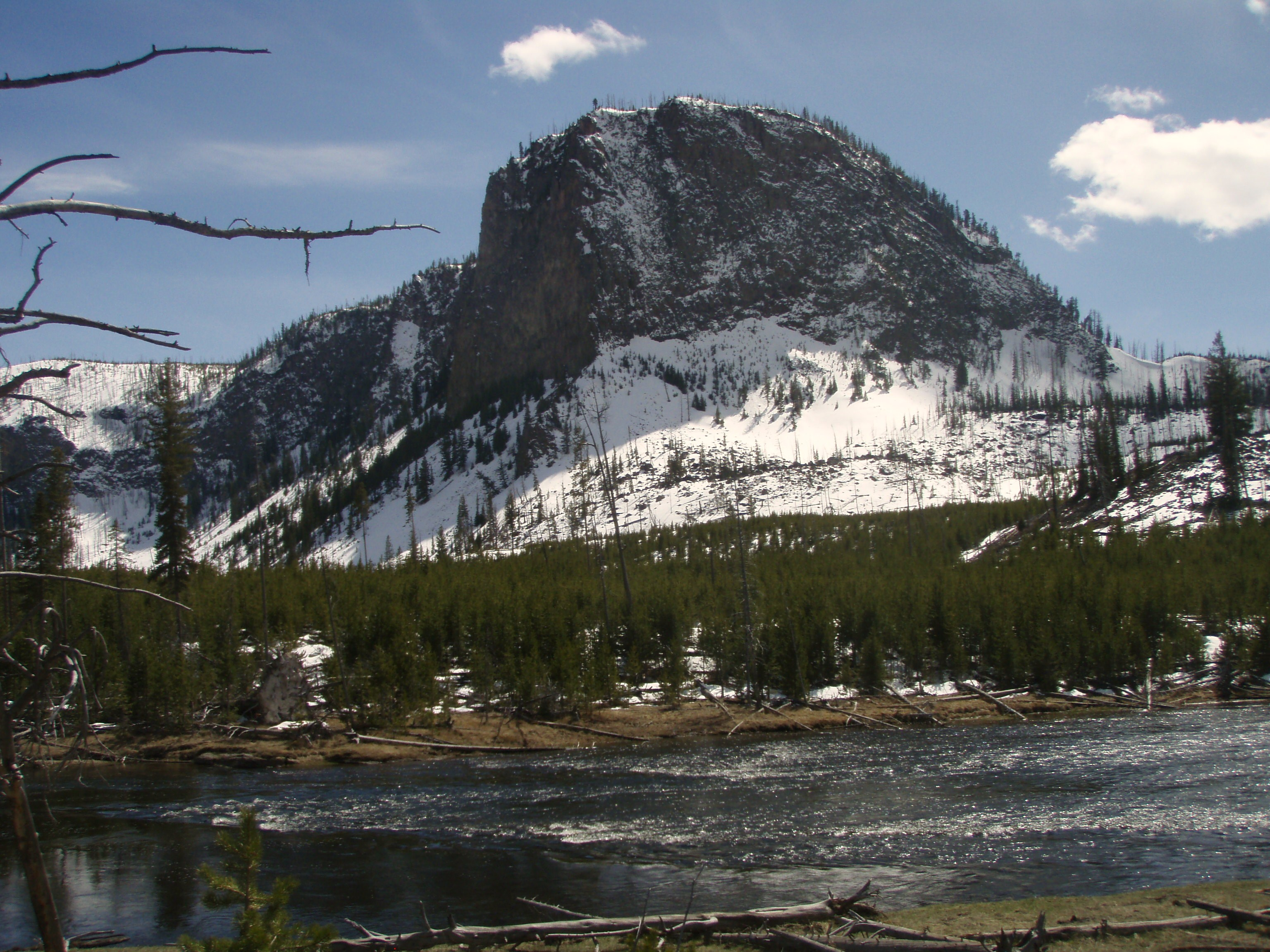
Mount Haynes, Yellowstone National Park

Upon F. Jay's death in 1921, Horace Albright, then superintendent of Yellowstone National Park, officially named a peak in the Madison Canyon area of the park as Mount Haynes. (44°37′58″N 110°56′46″W) Additionally, Albright had a large granite boulder taken from the Golden Gate section of the Mammoth to Norris road shipped to Saint Paul, Minnesota, to be placed on F. Jay's grave. Many of F. Jay Haynes' original photographs are highly valued collector's items, especially his larger 20- to 24-inch mammoth prints of the Yellowstone region. Original Haynes photos have been priced between $5,000 and $25,000, and some might command $50,000 today.

== Works published and/or illustrated by F. Jay Haynes ==
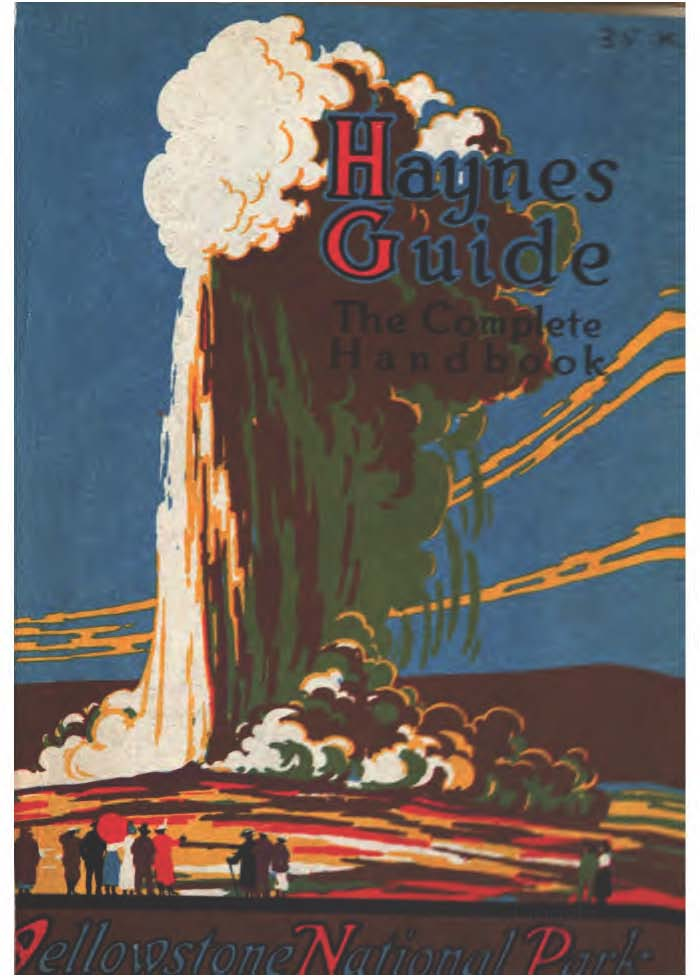
Cover of 1916 Haynes Guide

- Guptill, Albert B. (1891). A Ramble in Wonderland-A Description of the Marvelous Region Traversed by the Northern Pacific Railroad. Illustrated from photos by F. Jay Haynes. St Paul, MN: Charles F. Fee.
- Guptill, A. B. (1894). Yellowstone Park Guide-A Practical Handbook. Illustrated by F. Jay Haynes. St Paul, MN: F. Jay Haynes.
- Langford, Nathaniel Pitt (1905). The Discovery of Yellowstone Park; Diary of the Washburn Expedition to the Yellowstone and Firehole Rivers in the Year 1870. St. Paul, MN: Frank Jay Haynes.
- Haynes, F. Jay (1909). Haynes Souvenir Album-Yellowstone National Park. St Paul, MN: F. Jay Haynes.
- Haynes, F. Jay (1890). Haynes Guide-Yellowstone National Park. St Paul, MN: F. Jay Haynes.
  - The Haynes Guide was published annually and continually until 1966, first by F. Jay Haynes and then by his son Jack Ellis Haynes.
- Weed, Walter Harvey (1921). Geysers of Yellowstone National Park. Photographs by F. Jay Haynes. Washington, D.C.: U.S. Department of the Interior.
- Colburn, Edward F. (1910). Where Geysers Gush-Union Pacific Railroad-Oregon Short Line-Yellowstone National Park. Illustrations and photographs by F. Jay Haynes.
Notable images by F. Jay Haynes
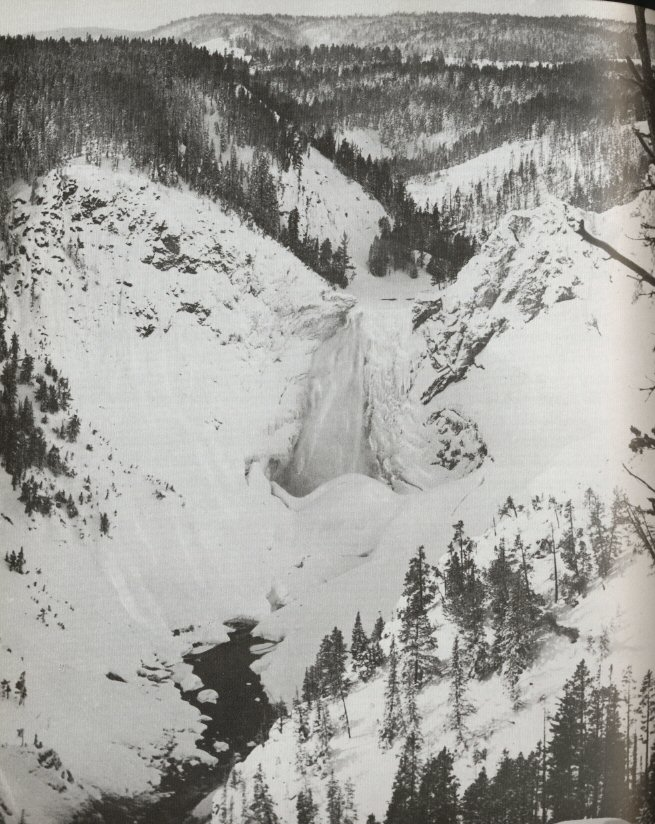
Lower Yellowstone Falls, January 1887

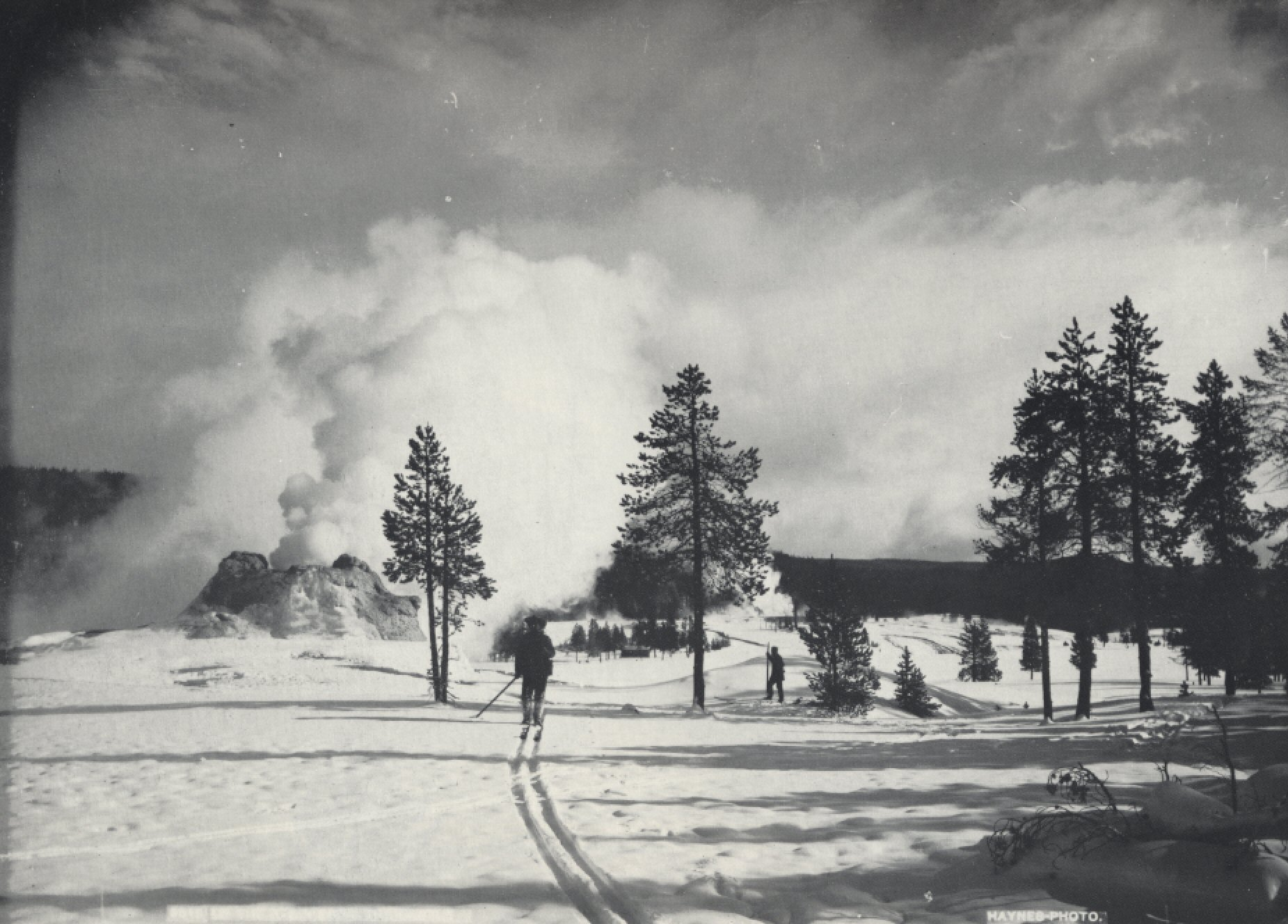
Castle Geyser, January 1887

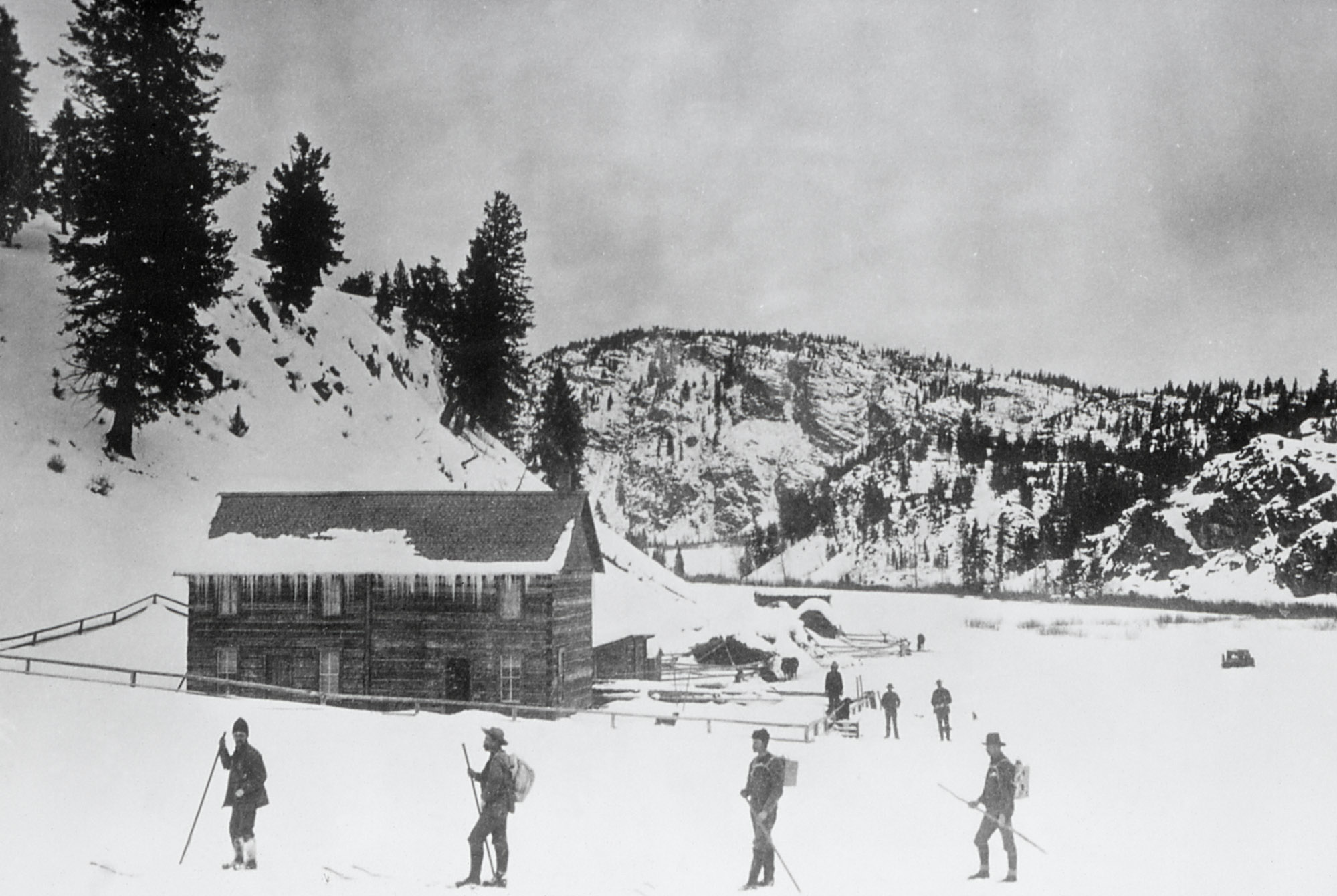
Haynes and party at Yanceys Pleasant Valley Hotel, January 1887

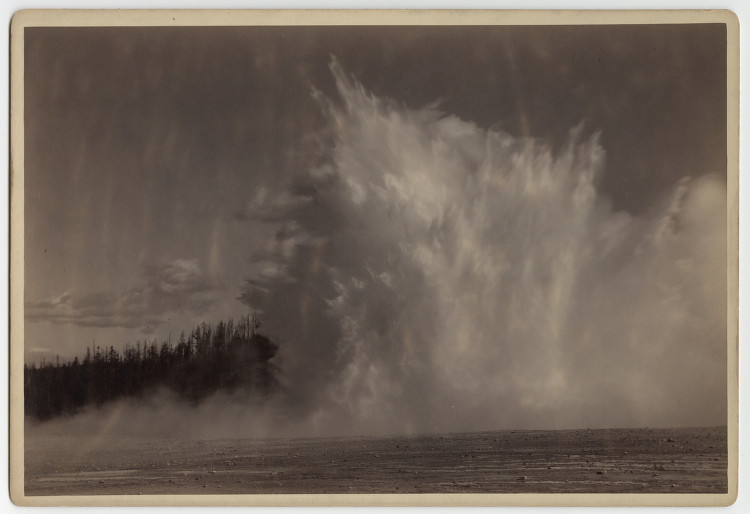
Excelsior Geyser (1888 photo)
