= Pemberton (surname) =

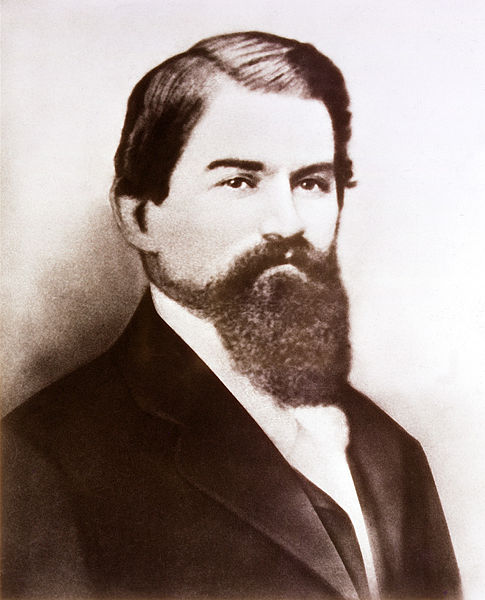
- John Pemberton (1831–1888), of Georgia, the inventor in 1886 of the carbonated soft drink Coca-Cola.

Origin
- Region of origin: Pemberton, old Lancashire, England

Other names
- Variant form: numerous

Pemberton is an English, Anglo Saxon surname first found in Pemberton, Greater Manchester, a residential area of Wigan, historically a part of Lancashire. It is common in the United Kingdom, and in places within the English diaspora such as Australia and the United States.

Etymologically, it consists of the elements Pen, Brythonic for hill or head, ber Anglo-Saxon for barley, and ton Anglo-Saxon for an enclosure or field; thus "Barley field on the hill".

== Surname ==
- Amy Pemberton, (born 1988), British actress
- Brock Pemberton (1885–1950), American theatrical producer and director
- Caroline Pemberton (born 1986), Australian model
- Charles Reece Pemberton (1790–1840), British actor and lecturer
- Charley Pemberton (1854–1894), son of John Pemberton
- Christopher Robert Pemberton (1765–1822), English physician
- Cyril Pemberton (1886–1975), American entomologist
- Daniel Pemberton (born 1977), English composer
- Ebenezer Pemberton (minister) (1671–1717), colonial American Congregational clergyman, bibliophile, and minister
- Ebenezer Pemberton (1746–1835), American educator
- Eli Pemberton (born 1997), American basketball player in the Polish Basketball League.
- Henry Pemberton (1694–1771), English physician and man of letters
- Hugh Pemberton (physician) (1890–1956), physician
- Hugh Pemberton (historian), historian
- John Pemberton (footballer) (born 1964), English football (soccer) player
- John C. Pemberton (1814–1881), Confederate States Army general in the American Civil War (1861–1865)
- John Stith Pemberton (1831–1888), inventor of Coca-Cola in Atlanta, Georgia in 1886
- Johnny Pemberton (born 1981), American actor and comedian
- Joseph Despard Pemberton, Canadian surveyor-general
- Joseph Scott Pemberton, a US Marine lance corporal who was charged with homicide for the death of Jennifer Laude, a Filipino trans woman
- Larry Pemberton, American politician
- Max Pemberton (1863–1950), British novelist
- Mike Pemberton (born 1963), Canadian politician and premier of Yukon
- Robin Leigh-Pemberton, Baron Kingsdown (1927–2013), Governor of the Bank of England (1983–1993)
- Sophie Pemberton (1869–1959), Canadian painter
- Stanton C. Pemberton (1858–1944), American businessman and politician
- Steve Pemberton (born 1967), British comedy writer and performer
- Steven Pemberton (born 1953), computer scientist
- Thomas Edgar Pemberton (1849–1905), English playwright and theatrical historian
- Victor Pemberton, British script writer and novelist

== Fictional characters ==
- Frank Pemberton, in the novel The Sweetness at the Bottom of the Pie by Alan Bradley
- Guy and Simon Pemberton, characters on the BBC R4 soap The Archers
- Sylvester Pemberton, DC Comics superhero the Star-Spangled Kid
- Greg Pemberton
- Mr. Pemberton, the main antagonist in Sneaky Sasquatch.

== See also ==
- Pemberton (disambiguation)
