= Jack Ellis Haynes =

Photographer and the concessionaire of Yellowstone National Park (1884-1962)

- Born: Jack Ellis Haynes; 1884; Fargo, North Dakota, US
- Died: 1962; Bozeman, Montana, US
- Other name: Mr. Yellowstone
- Occupation: Photographer
- Employer: Yellowstone National Park
- Known for: Official photographer and concessionaire of Yellowstone National Park, creator of Haynes Picture Shops

Jack E. Haynes (1884–1962) was an American photographer. He was the official photographer and concessionaire of Yellowstone National Park.

== Early life ==
Haynes was born on September 27, 1884, to Frank Jay Haynes and Lily Snyder in Fargo, North Dakota. He later moved with his family to Moorhead, Minnesota. Haynes grew up around his father, Frank Jay Haynes, who was the official photographer of Yellowstone National Park and who ran a successful photography business. Frank trained Jack in photography and business. Upon Frank’s retirement in 1916, Jack inherited the family business and continued as the official YNP photographer until his death in 1962. In 1921, when Frank died, Jack also inherited the physical studio outside of Yellowstone National Park and Frank’s archive of YNP photo negatives.

== Photographer of Yellowstone National Park ==
In 1927, Haynes built photo shops (also known as picture shops) on the Mammoth and Fishing Bridge campgrounds as well as a larger facility on the Old Faithful Auto Camp. The center of the business was at the Mammoth Hot Springs facility, which housed “dormitory, an overnight photo finishing service, and retail space that carried an assortment of photographs, books, camera film and other supplies”.

In 1928–1929, Haynes built the Haynes Picture Shop Headquarters. The headquarters included “a dormitory, an overnight photofinishing service, and retail space that carried an assortment of photographs, books, camera film, and other supplies.” In 1929, Haynes purchased five Harley-Davidson motorcycles to create an overnight developing service. The motorcycle riders would gather orders from the picture shops at the end of the business day and bring them to the development shop at Old Faithful There, they were developed and printed overnight. The drivers spent the night at the shop, then carried the orders back to the shops before they opened for business the next day.

By the time that the family concessionaire business was fully developed, it included seventeen picture shops and a stagecoach line. The business also circulated the Haynes Guide to Yellowstone, which was “updated and published 61 times between 1890 and 1964." Haynes gained the nickname “Mr. Yellowstone” because of his devotion to Yellowstone National Park and as an outgrowth of his work writing and revising the Haynes Guides. As a result of his research and writing, Haynes was considered to be one of the “most knowledgeable Yellowstone local historians” of his time.

Haynes operated the business until his death in 1962. Overall, the family ran the picture shops continuously from 1884 to 1968 for the span of 84 years.

== Personal life ==
Sometime in the 1910s, Haynes married his first wife, Margaret Larkin. In March 1930, the two divorced. Haynes married Isabel Naureth on April 10, 1930. In 1931, Isabel gave birth to the couple’s only child, a daughter named Lida Marie. The family moved to Bozeman, Montana. Following Lida’s death in an automobile accident in 1952, Jack and Isabel established the Haynes Foundation in 1958 to provide scholarships to deserving students at Montana State University in Bozeman.

== Later years ==
Haynes died on May 12, 1962. Following his death, his wife Isabel continued to run the photography business and operate the photo shops for five years, then sold them to Hamilton Stores.

== Publications ==
- Haynes, Jack Ellis. Yellowstone Stage Holdups. Enl. ed. Bozeman, Montana: Haynes Studios, 1959. Print..
- Haynes, Jack Ellis, and Haynes, Inc. Yellowstone National Park : The Red Portfolio Set. St. Paul, Minnesota; Yellowstone Park, Wyoming: Haynes, 1940. Print.
- Haynes, Jack Ellis, and Haynes Picture Shops. Haynes Road Log of Yellowstone National Park. 1st ed. Saint Paul, Minnesota: Haynes Picture Shops, 1936. Print.
- Haynes, Jack Ellis. Haynes Souvenir Album of Yellowstone National Park : A Collection of Scenic and Wild Life Photographs with Descriptions. Yellowstone Park, Wyoming: Haynes, 1940. Print.
- Haynes, Jack Ellis. Yellowstone News : Some News, a Little History, and a Couple of Ideas. Bozeman, Montana: Jack E. Haynes, 1961. Print.
- Haynes, Jack Ellis. Colorgraphs of Yellowstone National Park. St. Paul, Minn.; Yellowstone Park, Wyoming: Published and Distributed by J. E. Haynes, 1920. Print.
- Bauer, Clyde Max, and Jack Ellis Haynes. The Story of Yellowstone Geysers. Yellowstone Park, Wyoming, Saint Paul, Minnesota: Haynes, 1937. Print.
- Haynes, Jack Ellis. Yellowstone National Park : America's Wonderland in Natural Color. Bozeman, Montana: Haynes Studios, 1961. Print.
