= Mildred Leigh =

- Born: Mildred Josephine Leigh; June 1, 1902; Fairview Township, Fulton County, Illinois, US
- Died: December 16, 1997 (aged 95); Bozeman, Montana, US
- Occupation: Educator
- Awards: Honorary Doctorate from Montana State University MSU Blue and Gold Award

Mildred Leigh (1902–1997) was an American teacher and administrator from Illinois. She gained most of her renown at Montana State College in Bozeman, Montana, as the director of Hamilton Hall and the Student Union. She was active in the Bozeman community. She received an honorary doctorate from MSU, and the Leigh Lounge in the Student Union Building was dedicated to her.

== Early life ==
Mildred Leigh (born Mildred Josephine Leigh, June 1, 1902 – December 16, 1997) was born in Fairview Township, Fulton County, Illinois to Walter A. Leigh and Lacie Olive Gentle Leigh. Her parents were farmers and had also been born in Fairview.

== Education ==
In 1925, Mildred graduated from Cornell College, Iowa, with a degree in home economics. In 1932, she earned a master's degree from the University of Chicago.

== Career ==
After beginning her career as a teacher in Tennessee, she moved to Bozeman and began teaching institution management at Montana State College (now Montana State University) in 1930. She was also the staff director of Hamilton Hall, the "women's freshman dormitory and the only dormitory on campus" during this time. In 1946, she became the director of the Student Union. As director, she planned kitchen and dining facilities, and the Student Union Building designated the Leigh Lounge in her honor in 1990.

== Later life ==
Upon retirement, Leigh volunteered as the first business manager of the Bozeman Symphony Society. In the late 1960s, Leigh's sister, Marjorie Ann, moved to Bozeman and lived with Leigh in a house on Durston Road. The pair later moved into an apartment closer to town. Montana State University awarded her an honorary doctorate in 1977. She died in Bozeman on December 16, 1997.

== Bibliography ==
- President's Commission on the Status of University Women. “Mildred Leigh.” Extraordinary Ordinary Women of MSU, Profiles. 2018. Mildred Leigh - PCOSUW | Montana State University
- Scott, Kim Allen. “Biographical Note” Mildred J. Leigh Papers, 1840–1997. Montana State University Special Collections and Archives. 2016. Archives West: Mildred J. Leigh Papers, 1840-1997
