= Mercedes Leigh =

American actress

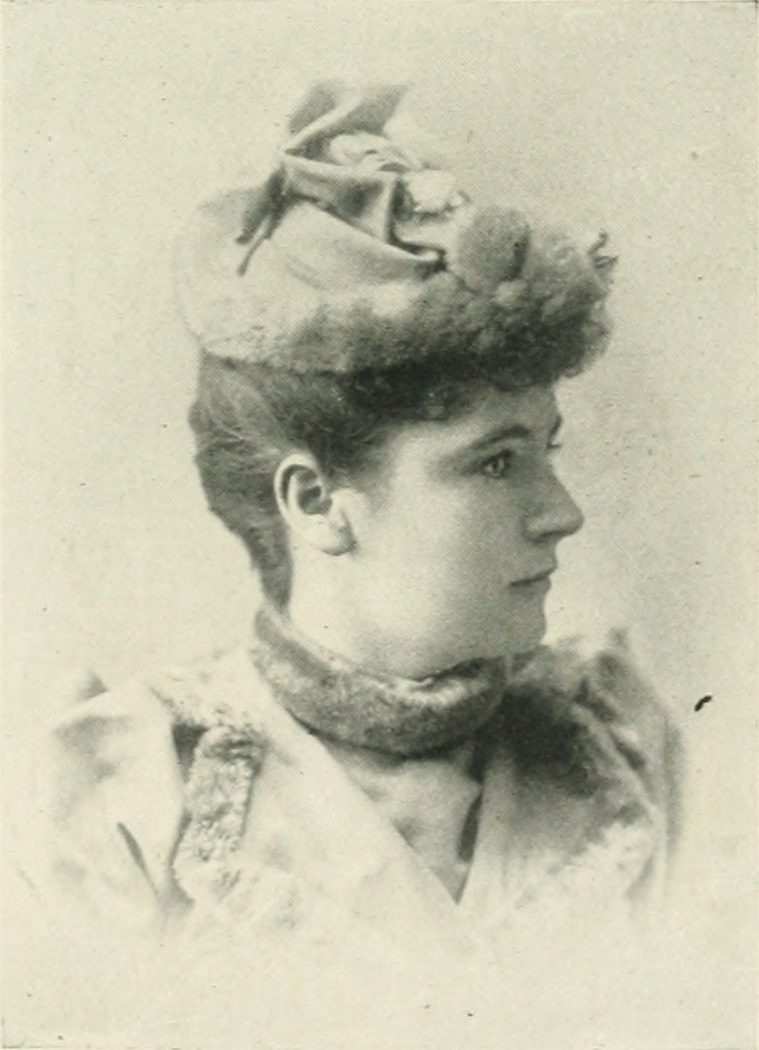
Mercedes Leigh Hearne, "A woman of the century"

Mercedes Leigh (née, Mercedes Leigh Hearne; March 20, 1867–?) was an American actress. She was widely known by her stage name, Mercedes Leigh, which she chose when she began her professional career. Her contemporaries were Mary Haviland Sutton and Mary C. Francis.

== Early life and education ==
Mercedes Leigh Hearne was born in Atlanta, Georgia, March 20, 1867. She was born into the changed conditions that followed the American Civil War in the South, and her early life was full of the echoes of that struggle. She was educated in a private school in Philadelphia, Pennsylvania. At an early age, she developed marked dramatic talent, which was carefully cultivated.

== Career ==
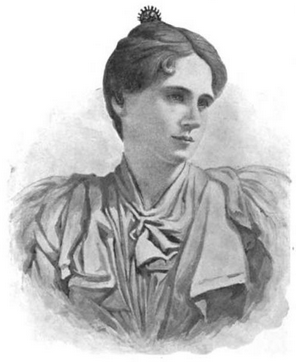
ca. 1897

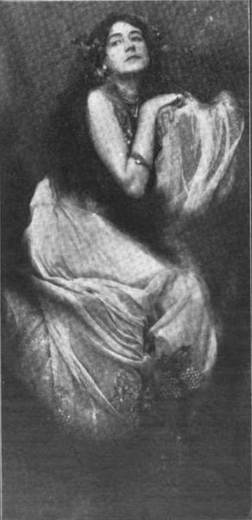
1906

Her histrionic powers and her emotional nature fitted her for stage work. She went to England, and while there, achieved success in London drawing rooms as a dramatic reader. The critics abroad ranked her highly, and in the United States, she repeated her successes on an even greater scale. When she appeared in New York in Oscar Wilde's Salome, a dramatized version of the Song of Songs, the biblical model and language were closely followed. Leigh was a Shakespearean reciter, impersonator, and reader in character. She was a teacher of oratory, vocal, aesthetic, and physical culture, as well as reading, recitation, and dramatic expression, pantomime, statue posing, and stage technique.

Besides her dramatic talents, Leigh possessed poetic ability. Her New York City studios were located in Carnegie Hall and at The Marquart on 59th Street. She made her home in New York.

In 1925 she was known as Mrs McAllister Smith.
