= Fairview Township, Fulton County, Illinois =

Fairview Township
- Township
- Location in Fulton County

- Fulton County's location in Illinois
- Coordinates: 40°40′09″N 90°09′02″W
- Country: United States
- State: Illinois
- County: Fulton
- Established: November 6, 1849

Area
  - Total: 35.95 sq mi (93.1 km^{2})
  - Land: 35.54 sq mi (92.0 km^{2})
  - Water: 0.41 sq mi (1.1 km^{2}) 1.14%
- Elevation: 696 ft (212 m)

Population (2020)
  - Total: 596
  - Density: 16.8/sq mi (6.47/km^{2})
- Time zone: UTC-6 (CST)
  - Summer (DST): UTC-5 (CDT)
- ZIP codes: 61432, 61520, 61531, 61544
- FIPS code: 17-057-25076

Fairview Township is one of 26 townships in Fulton County, in the U.S. state of Illinois. As of the 2020 census, its population was 596 and it contained 285 housing units.

== Geography ==
According to the 2021 census gazetteer files, Fairview Township has a total area of 35.95 square miles (93.11 km^{2}), of which 35.54 square miles (92.05 km^{2}) (or 98.86%) is land and 0.41 square miles (1.06 km^{2}) (or 1.14%) is water.

=== Cities, towns, villages ===
- Fairview
- Oak Mound (no longer exists)
- Parrville

=== Cemeteries ===
The township contains these five cemeteries: Coal Creek, Fairview, Lyons, Markley and Shumaker.

=== Major highways ===
- Illinois Route 97
- Illinois Route 116

== Demographics ==
As of the 2020 census there were 596 people, 264 households, and 128 families residing in the township. The population density was 16.58 inhabitants per square mile (6.40/km^{2}). There were 285 housing units at an average density of 7.93 per square mile (3.06/km^{2}). The racial makeup of the township was 96.31% White, 0.17% African American, 0.00% Native American, 0.34% Asian, 0.00% Pacific Islander, 0.84% from other races, and 2.35% from two or more races. Hispanic or Latino of any race were 1.17% of the population.

There were 264 households, out of which 22.30% had children under the age of 18 living with them, 44.32% were married couples living together, 4.17% had a female householder with no spouse present, and 51.52% were non-families. 33.30% of all households were made up of individuals, and 14.40% had someone living alone who was 65 years of age or older. The average household size was 2.38 and the average family size was 3.02.

The township's age distribution consisted of 18.9% under the age of 18, 8.3% from 18 to 24, 23% from 25 to 44, 27.8% from 45 to 64, and 22.0% who were 65 years of age or older. The median age was 44.9 years. For every 100 females, there were 90.3 males. For every 100 females age 18 and over, there were 89.9 males.

The median income for a household in the township was $73,125, and the median income for a family was $83,571. Males had a median income of $45,278 versus $41,806 for females. The per capita income for the township was $35,338. About 2.3% of families and 5.8% of the population were below the poverty line, including 8.8% of those under age 18 and 5.8% of those age 65 or over.

Historical population
Census	Pop.	Note	%±
2000	686		—
2010	698		1.7%
2020	596		−14.6%
U.S. Decennial Census

== School districts ==
- Farmington Central Community Unit School District 265
- Spoon River Valley Community Unit School District 4

== Political districts ==
- Illinois' 17th congressional district
- State House District 91
- State Senate District 46
