= Marian T. Place =

American author (1910–2006)

- Born: Marian Whitinger Templeton; October 10, 1910; Gary, Indiana
- Died: April 16, 2006 (aged 95); Portland, Oregon
- Education: B.S. University of Minnesota B.A. Rollins College MLIS University of Minnesota
- Occupation: Author
- Awards: Spur Award Mark Twain Award Garden State Children's Book Award

Marian T. Place was an American author who wrote nonfiction, fiction and juvenile fiction books as well as essays relating to the American West. She wrote more than 40 books under her own name and several pseudonyms.

== Personal life and education ==
Marian Whitinger Templeton was born in 1910 in Gary, Indiana to Clarence Ray and Lillian R. Templeton. In 1931, she earned a B.S. from the University of Minnesota, followed in 1935 with a B.A. from Rollins College in Winter Park, Florida. Templeton subsequently earned her Masters of Library Science at the University of Minnesota. Shortly after completing her education, Templeton met Howard Thirloway Place while working for the Glasgow Courier and married him in 1936 in Glasgow, Montana. They went on to have two children, David and Nancy. Place and her husband moved to Oregon in 1962, residing in Multnomah and Jackson Counties before moving to Arizona in 1977. They returned to Oregon in 1992 where Place lived until her death in 2006.

== Professional life ==
Place published works under her own name and two pseudonyms, Dale White and R.D. Whitinger. When writing about hunting, fishing, the Forest Service, and other science and nature related topics, Place published under Dale White, while R.D. Whitinger was used only briefly when Place dabbled with writing Westerns. She was the recipient of several awards under one of her pseudonyms and her own name, including the Mark Twain Award. Place was a prolific writer, publishing over 40 children's books in addition to magazine articles for Montana: The Magazine of Western History, and books under her pseudonyms. She also led several workshops on juvenile writing across the United States, including workshops at University of Montana, University of Colorado, Arizona Authors Association, and Cape Cod Writers Conference.

== Published materials ==
The following list contains some of Place's writing, both magazine articles and books.

Published under Marian T. Place

- "The Kid's Corral." Montana: The Magazine of Western History, Autumn 1956, 1957.
- "The Endless Debate Rages: Historical Fictionalizing Versus Fact." Montana: The Magazine of Western History, Spring 1955.
- The Boy Who Saw Bigfoot
- The Witch Who Saved Halloween
- On the Track of Bigfoot
- Nobody Meets Bigfoot
- Bigfoot All Over the Country
- Cariboo Gold: The Story of the British Columbia Gold Rush
- The Resident Witch
- Mount St. Helen's: A Sleeping Volcano Awakes
- The First Astrowitches
- Marcus and Narcissa Whitman: Oregon Pioneers
- The Copper Kings of Montana
- Westward on the Oregon Trail
- Gold Down Under
- Mountain Man
- Comanches and Other Indians of Texas
- The Frontiersman: The True Story of Billy Dixon
- American Cattle Trails East and West
- The Yukon

Published under Dale White

- The Singing Boones
- Is Something Up There?
- Young Deputy Smith
- Hold Back the Hunter
- The Johnny Cake McNe
- Vigilantes, Ride!
- Steamboat Up the Missouri
- Gifford Pinchot, The Man Who Saved Forests
- Bat Masterson
- Thunder in his Mo

Published under R.D. Whitinger

- High Trail
- Bitterroot Basin

== Awards ==
Under the pseudonym Dale White, Place was awarded the Spur Award from the Western Writers of America two times. The first was for Steamboat Up the Missouri in 1958 and the second was for Hold Back the Hunter in 1959.

Under her own name, Place received the Mark Twain Award for The Boy Who Saw Bigfoot in 1982. She also was awarded the Garden State's Children Book Award in 1977 for On the Track of Bigfoot. Place was nominated for the California Young Reader Medal for The Boy Who Saw Bigfoot in 1982–1983.

== Legacy ==
There are several archival collections of Marian T. Place's work, including at Montana State University's Merril G. Burlingame Archives and Special Collections, at the Arizona State University Archives, and at the University of Wyoming.
