= Henry Sambrooke Leigh =

English writer and playwright

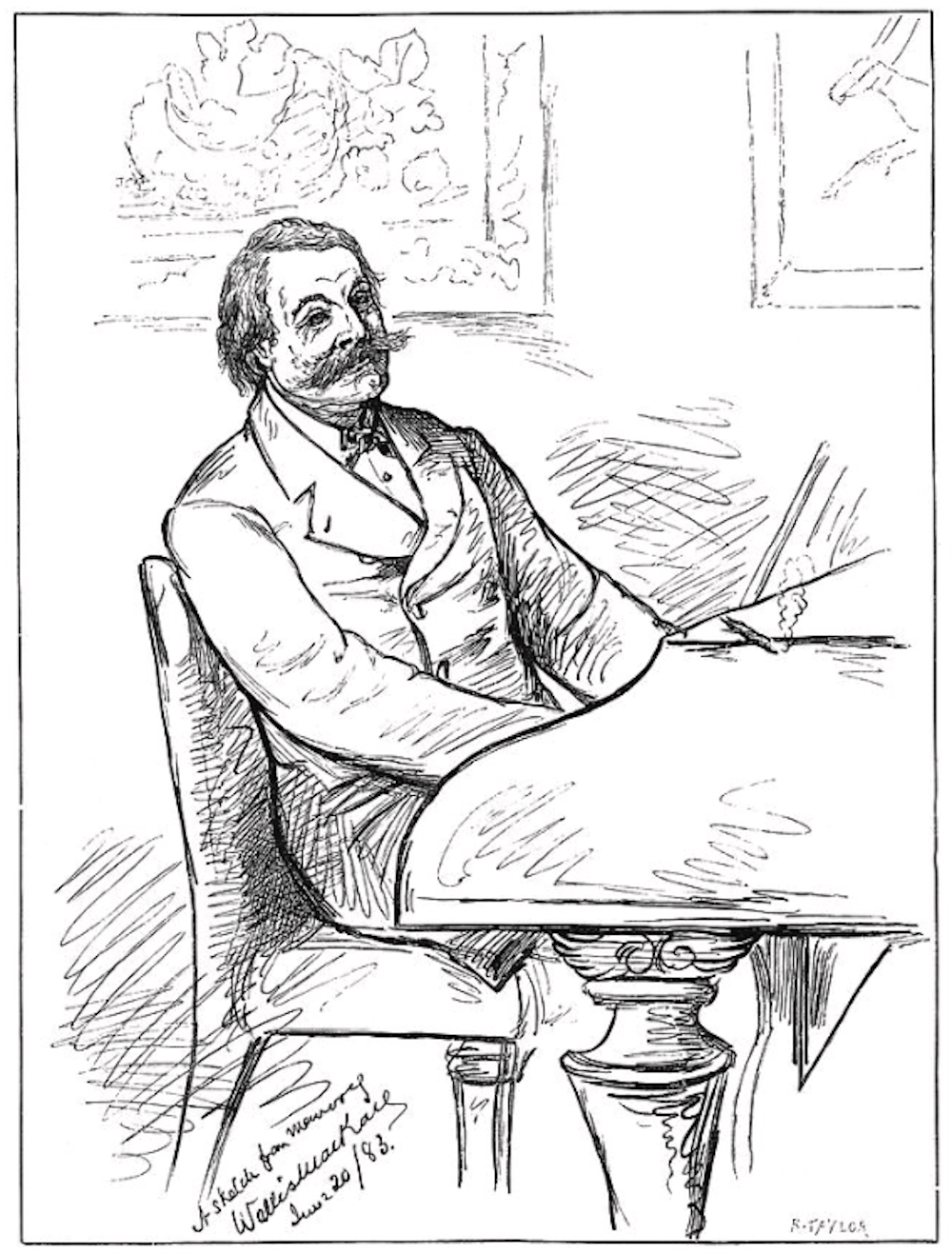
Henry Sambrooke Leigh (1883)

Henry Sambrooke Leigh (29 March 1837 – 16 June 1883) was an English writer and playwright.

== Biography ==
Leigh, son of James Mathews Leigh, was born in London on 29 March 1837. At an early age he engaged in literary pursuits. From time to time appeared collections of his lyrics, under the titles of Carols of Cockayne, 1869 (several editions); Gillott and Goosequill, 1871; A Town Garland: a Collection of Lyrics, 1878; and Strains from the Strand: Trifles in Verse, 1882. His verse was always fluent, but otherwise of very slender merit.

For the stage he translated many French comic operas. His first theatrical essay was in collaboration with Charles Millward in a musical spectacle for the Theatre Royal in Birmingham. His ‘Falsacappa,’ music by Offenbach, was produced at the Globe Theatre on 22 April 1871; ‘Le Roi Carotte’ at the Alhambra on 3 June 1872; ‘Bridge of Sighs,’ opera-bouffe, at the St. James's, 18 Nov. 1872; ‘White Cat,’ a fairy spectacle, at the Queen's, Long Acre, on 2 Dec. 1875; ‘Voyage dans la Lune,’ opera-bouffe, at the Alhambra, on 15 April 1876; ‘Fatinitza,’ opera-bouffe (the words were printed), adapted from the German, at the Alhambra on 20 June 1878; ‘The Great Casimir,’ a vaudeville, at the Gaiety, on 27 Sept. 1879; ‘Cinderella,’ an opera, with music by J. Farmer, at St. James's Hall, on 2 May 1884 (the words were published in 1882); ‘The Brigands,’ by H. Meilhac and L. Halévy, adapted to English words by Leigh, was printed in 1884. For ‘Lurette,’ a comic opera, Avenue, 24 March 1883, he wrote the lyrics; and with Robert Reece he produced ‘La Petite Mademoiselle,’ comic opera, Alhambra, on 6 October 1879. He edited ‘Jeux d'Esprit written and spoken by French and English Wits and Humorists,’ in 1877, and wrote Mark Twain's ‘Nightmares’ in 1878.

His last theatrical venture—a complete failure—was ‘The Prince Methusalem,’ a comic opera, brought out at the Folies Dramatiques (now the Kingsway), Great Queen Street, London, on 19 May 1883. He was a Spanish, Portuguese, and French scholar, a brilliant and witty conversationalist, and a humorous singer.

He died in his rooms in Lowther's private hotel, 35 Strand, London, on 16 June 1883, and was buried in Brompton cemetery on 22 June.

== Notes ==
His poem "The Twins" is a favorite for young children.

The Twins

In form and feature, face and limb,
I grew so like my brother,
That folks got taking me for him,
And each for one another.
It puzzled all our kith and kin,
It reached a fearful pitch;
For one of us was born a twin,
Yet not a soul knew which.

One day, to make the matter worse,
Before our names were fixed,
As we were being washed by nurse,
We got completely mixed;
And thus, you see, by fate's decree,
Or rather nurse's whim,
My brother John got christened me,
And I got christened him.

This fatal likeness even dogged
My footsteps when at school,
And I was always getting flogged,
For John turned out a fool.
I put this question, fruitlessly,
To everyone I knew,
"What would you do, if you were me,
To prove that you were you?"

Our close resemblance turned the tide
Of my domestic life,
For somehow, my intended bride
Became my brother's wife.
In fact, year after year the same
Absurd mistakes went on,
And when I died, the neighbours came
And buried brother John!
