= Henry Hilton Leigh =

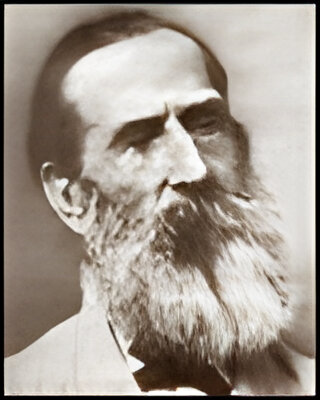
- Portrait photo of Leigh
- Born: December 31, 1832; Old Ross, County Wexford, Ireland
- Died: June 27, 1911 (aged 78); Peru
- Other names: Henry Hilton Leigh Whitney
- Occupation: Business magnate
- Known for: Peru's leading exporter of cotton and cattle in the early 20th century
- Spouse: Carmen Cortés del Castillo (m. 1857) Mercedes Jesús Cortés del Castillo (m. 1886)
- Children: 5

Henry Hilton Leigh (31 December 1832 – 27 June 1911), also known as Henry Hilton Leigh Whitney, was an Irish-Peruvian business magnate and philanthropist.

Born in Old Ross, County Wexford, Ireland, Leigh emigrated to South America at the height of the Great Famine of Ireland, arriving in Chile in 1853 before settling in Paita, Peru, in 1855. His Piura-based firm, H. H. Leigh, established the region's first cotton press, and by the early 20th century was Peru's leading exporter of cotton and cattle.

Leigh served as the founding president of the Piura Chamber of Commerce until 1905. According to one scholar, he was emblematic of the waves of immigrants who controlled and developed key economic sectors in 19th-century Peru.

== Marriage and family ==
Leigh married Carmen Cortés del Castillo in 1857 and had no children. In 1886, he married Carmen's sister, Mercedes Jesús Cortés del Castillo, and had five children.
