= John C. Paulsen =

American architect (1853–1897)

- Born: January 20, 1853; Germany
- Died: March 31, 1897 (aged 44); Helena, Montana
- Occupation: Architect

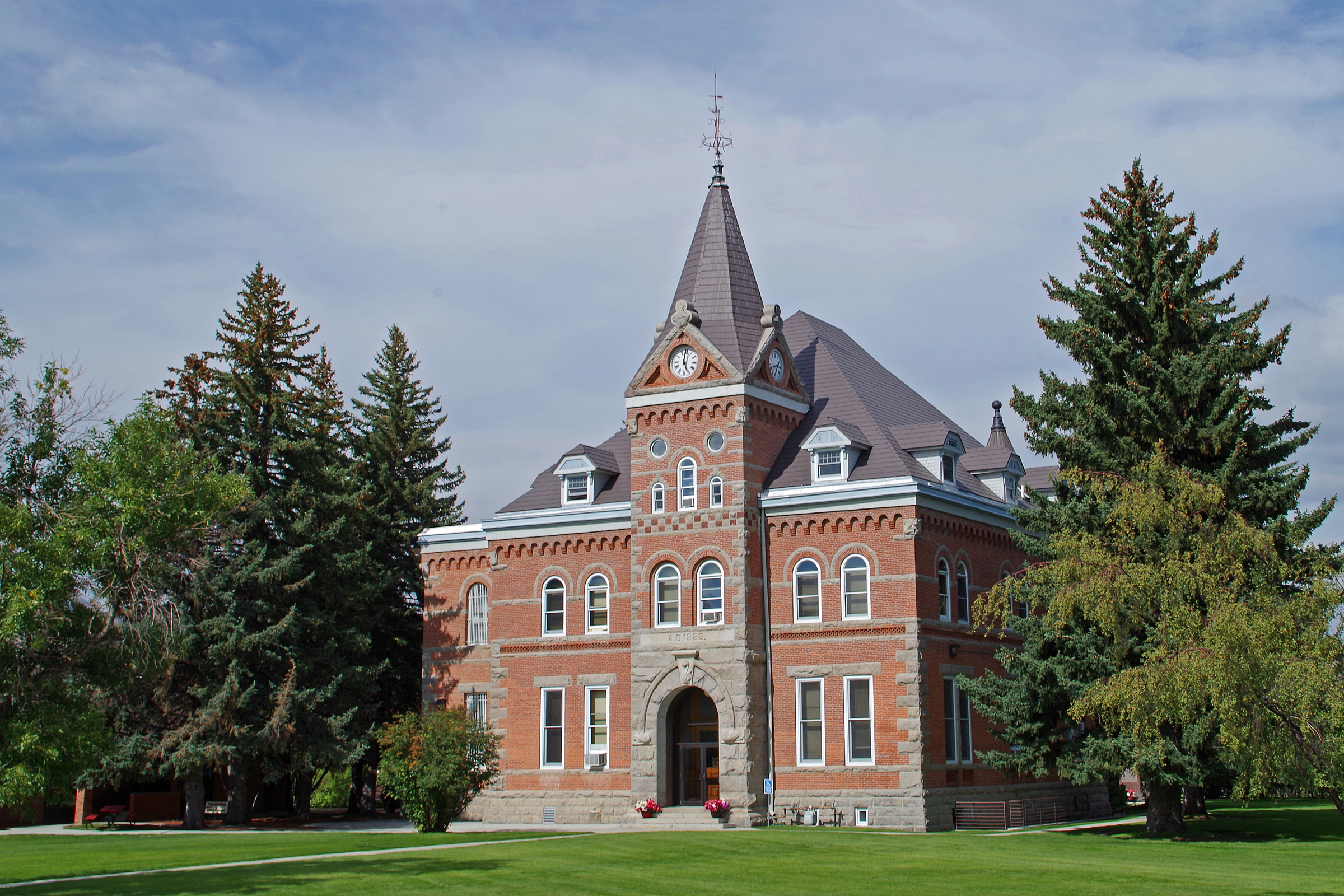
The Jefferson County Courthouse in Boulder, Montana, designed by Paulsen & McConnell and built in 1888.

John Carlos Paulsen (1853–1897) was a German-American architect who designed buildings in Montana, several of which are listed on the National Register of Historic Places.

== Career ==
John C. Paulsen was born on January 1, 1853, in the Duchy of Holstein. He was educated at what is now the Leibniz University Hannover and served in the German army. In 1887 he came to the United States and settled in Helena, where he formed a partnership with builder Noah J. McConnell. One of his early works was the Jefferson County Courthouse in Boulder, built in 1888. The firm of Paulsen & McConnell was dissolved in 1891, and Paulsen formed a new partnership with John Lavalle, a native of Peru formerly living in Boston. Projects by Paulsen & Lavalle included the first Montana Club in Helena in 1891–1893. After the building burned down in 1903, a new building was erected, although the original first floor designed by Paulsen & Lavalle remains. Circa 1894 Lavalle returned to Boston, and in 1895 Paulsen was appointed architect of several state institutions.

Buildings designed for the state include the Montana Deaf and Dumb Asylum, although it was completed by Charles S. Haire after his death. Fred Whiteside, a state legislator, later claimed that Paulsen's later troubles stemmed from these state projects. In February 1897 Paulsen was dismissed from his state job and died soon after.

== Personal life and death ==
"He was naturally warm-hearted and impulsive and everyone who had the pleasure of his acquaintance was his personal friend. Upright, honest and straightforward in all of his business transactions he was respected by all and the city and state not only lost a good citizen but a much respected and highly regarded man," - Helena Semi Weekly Herald, April 8, 1897

Paulsen was married on April 17, 1889 to Margaret Wilson of Helena. at No. 19 South Rodney Street. A son was born to Paulsen and his wife.

After winning his state jobs, Paulsen had allegedly accepted bribes from contractors on those projects, which in turn led to Paulsen being offered the job to design the Montana State Capitol by corrupt legislators of the Capitol Commission, though he was replaced in this conspiracy by St. Louis architect George R. Mann late in 1896. In early 1897 a grand jury was convened in Helena to investigate, at which Paulsen testified on March 18. Whiteside, who also testified and later led a further investigation into the Capitol Commission, believed that the stress of this ordeal caused his death. On March 29, 1897, Paulsen suffered a nervous breakdown and died at home in the early hours of March 31, a day before he was to testify a second time. The official cause of death was apoplexy. For several days prior Paulsen had numerous attacks of dizziness. He broke down suddenly while in town and had to be driven home in a carriage. He suffered from intense agony through the night and by daylight, he was in a comatose condition. It was believed that there was a rupture of a small blood vessel in the brain and it gradually increased until his death.

Paulsen's death was reported in the newspapers in April 1897. Over the next several years several people claimed he had faked his death. However, to satisfy creditors, after his burial, his grave was opened by the county coroner, who with witnesses confirmed the presence of his remains.

== Architectural works ==
- Jefferson County Courthouse, 201 W Centennial Ave, Boulder, Montana (1888, NRHP 1980)
- Higgins Block, 202 N Higgins Ave, Missoula, Montana (1889, NRHP 1979)
- House for William S. Spalding, 433 Clarke St, Helena, Montana (1889, NRHP 2006)
- Bach-Cory Block, 7 Park Dr, Great Falls, Montana (1890, altered)
- Boise Natatorium, Warm Springs Ave, Boise, Idaho (1891–1892, demolished 1934)
- Montana Club, 24 W Sixth Ave, Helena, Montana (1891–1893, burned 1903)
- Boise City Hall, N 8th and W Idaho Sts, Boise, Idaho (1892–1893, demolished 1953)
- Columbia Theatre, 809 W Jefferson St, Boise, Idaho (1893, demolished 1908)
- R.Z. Johnson Block, Row House on 500 block of Idaho Street, Boise, Idaho (1892–1893),
- House for James C. Armstrong, 2580 Jefferson Ave, Ogden, Utah (1893, NRHP 1971)
- Helena High School, Helena, Montana (1893-1935, demolished 1976)
- Main Hall, Montana Technological University, Butte, Montana (1896-1900)
- Main Hall, University of Montana Western, Dillon, Montana (1896–1897, NRHP 1980)
- Montana Deaf and Dumb Asylum, Boulder, Colorado (1896–1898, NRHP 1985)
- Montana Hall, Montana State University, Bozeman, Montana (1896–1898)

== Gallery of architectural works ==
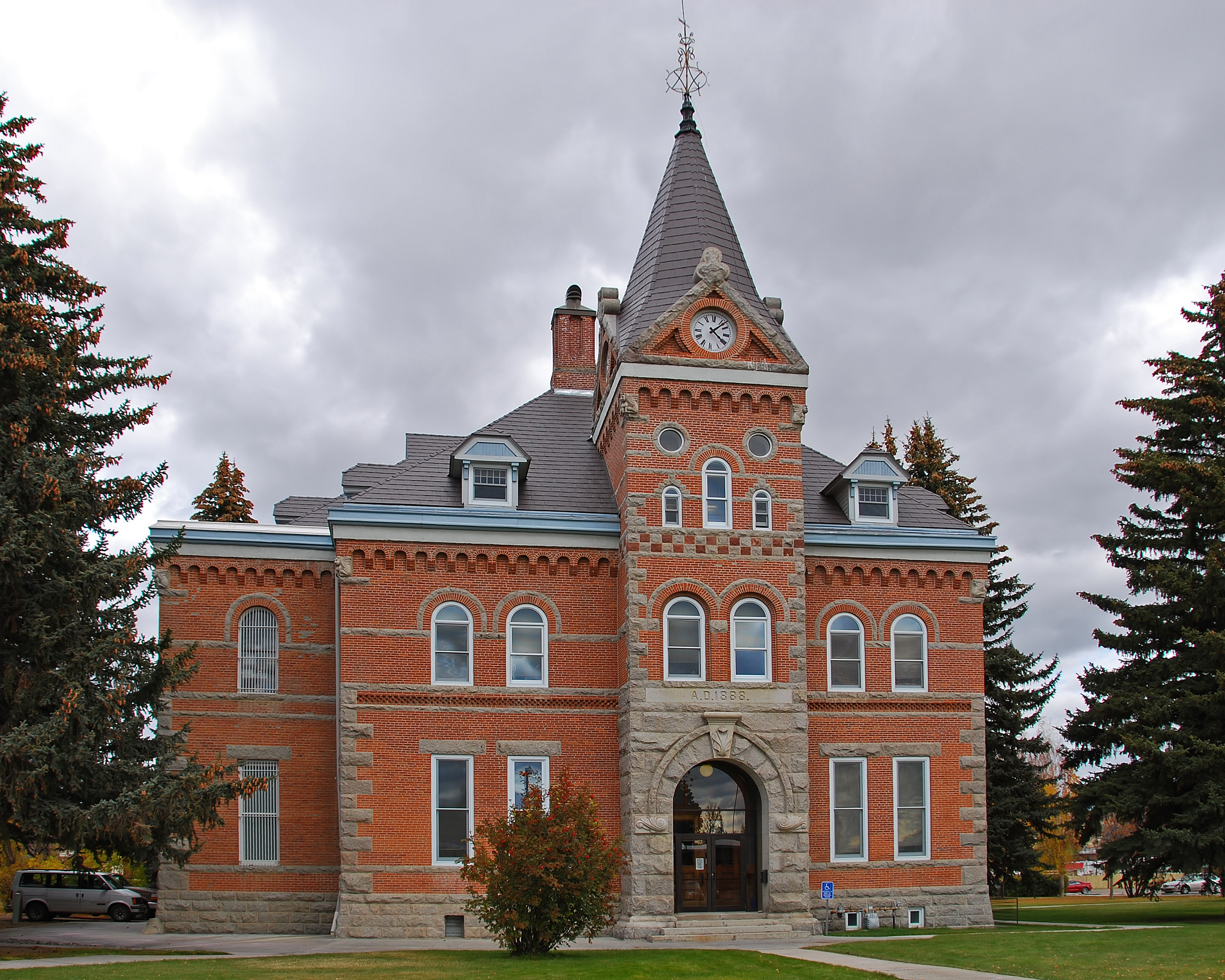
Jefferson County Courthouse, Boulder, Montana, 1888.

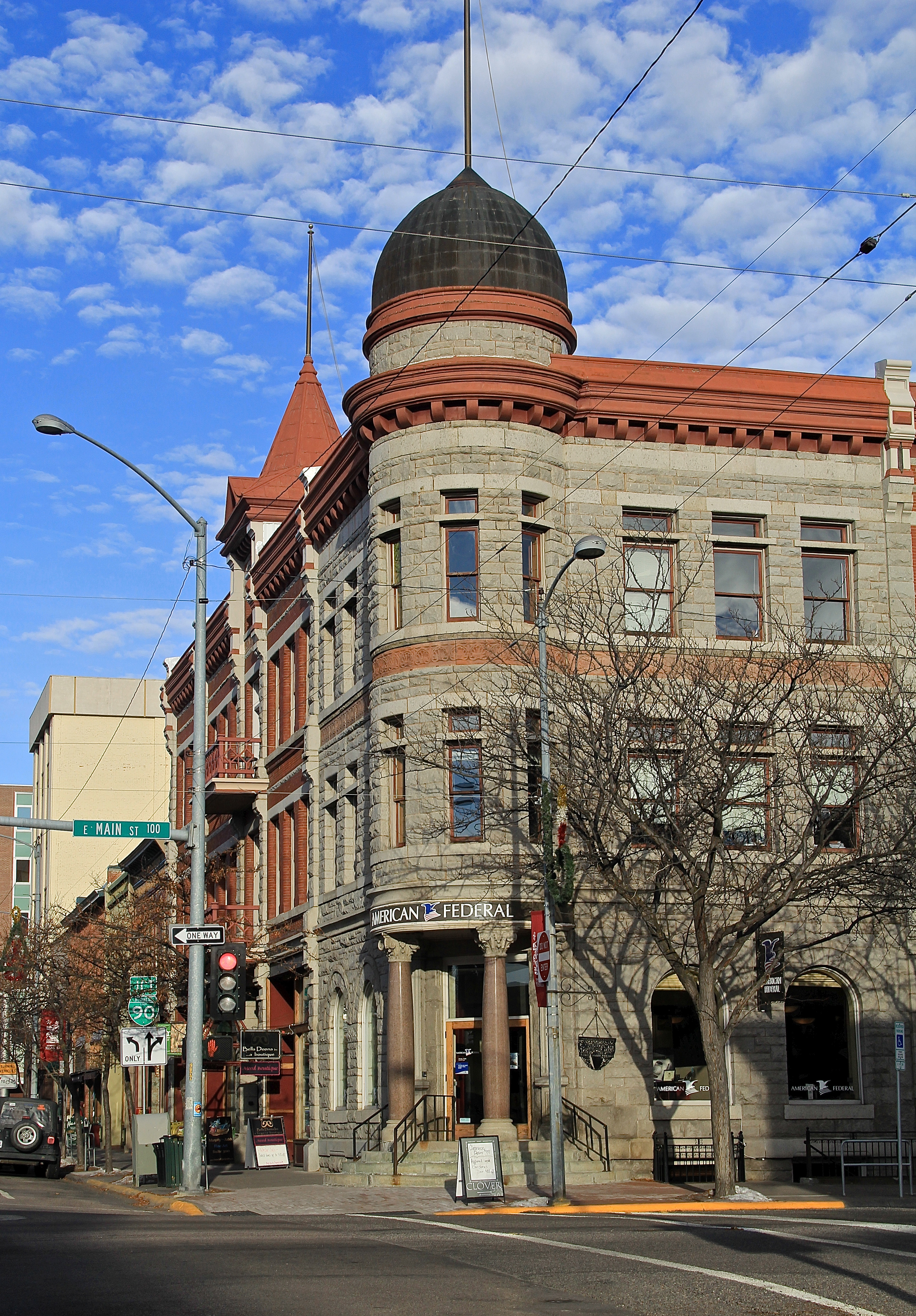
Higgins Block, Missoula, Montana, 1889.

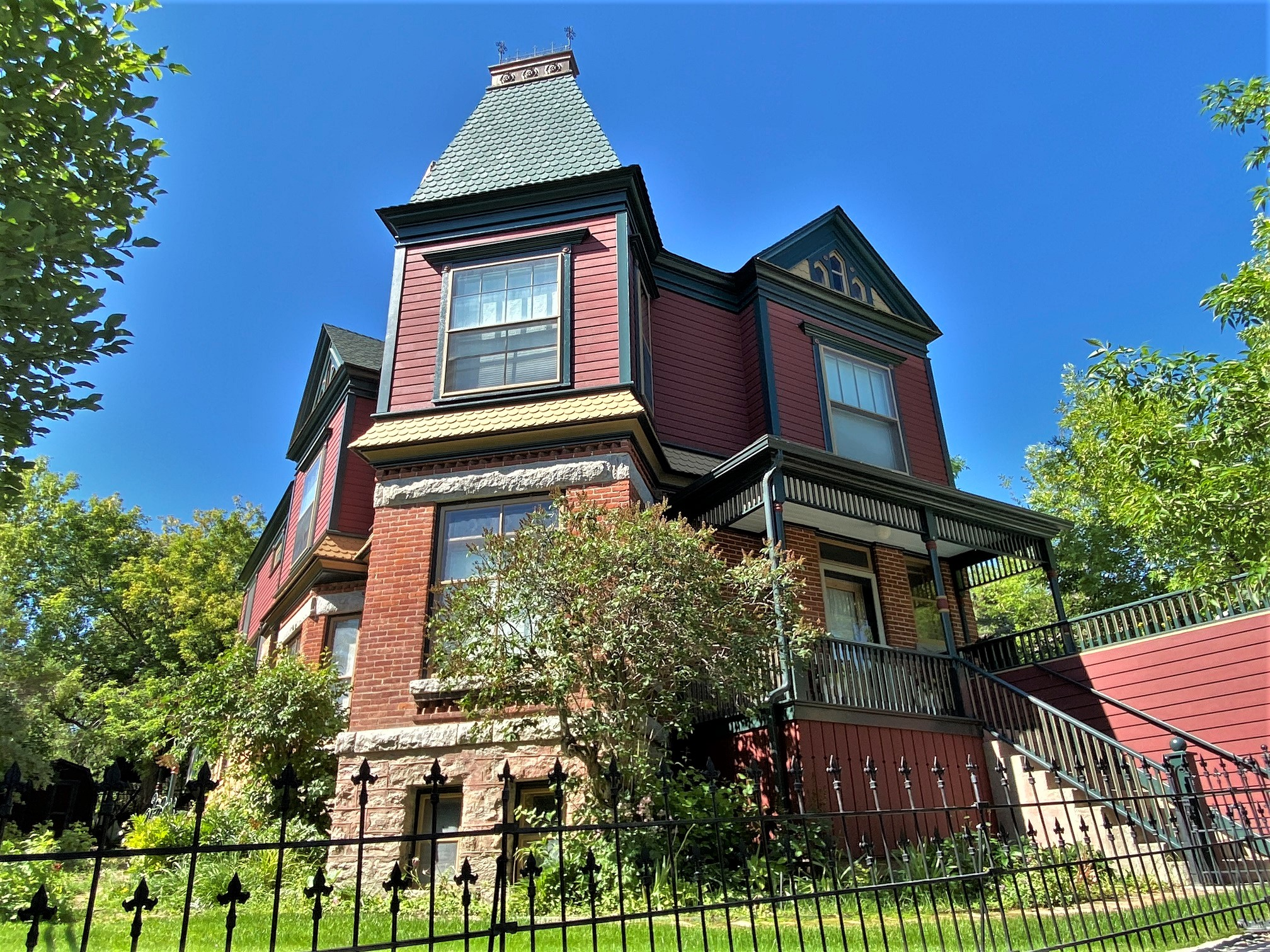
House for William S. Spalding, Helena, Montana, 1889.

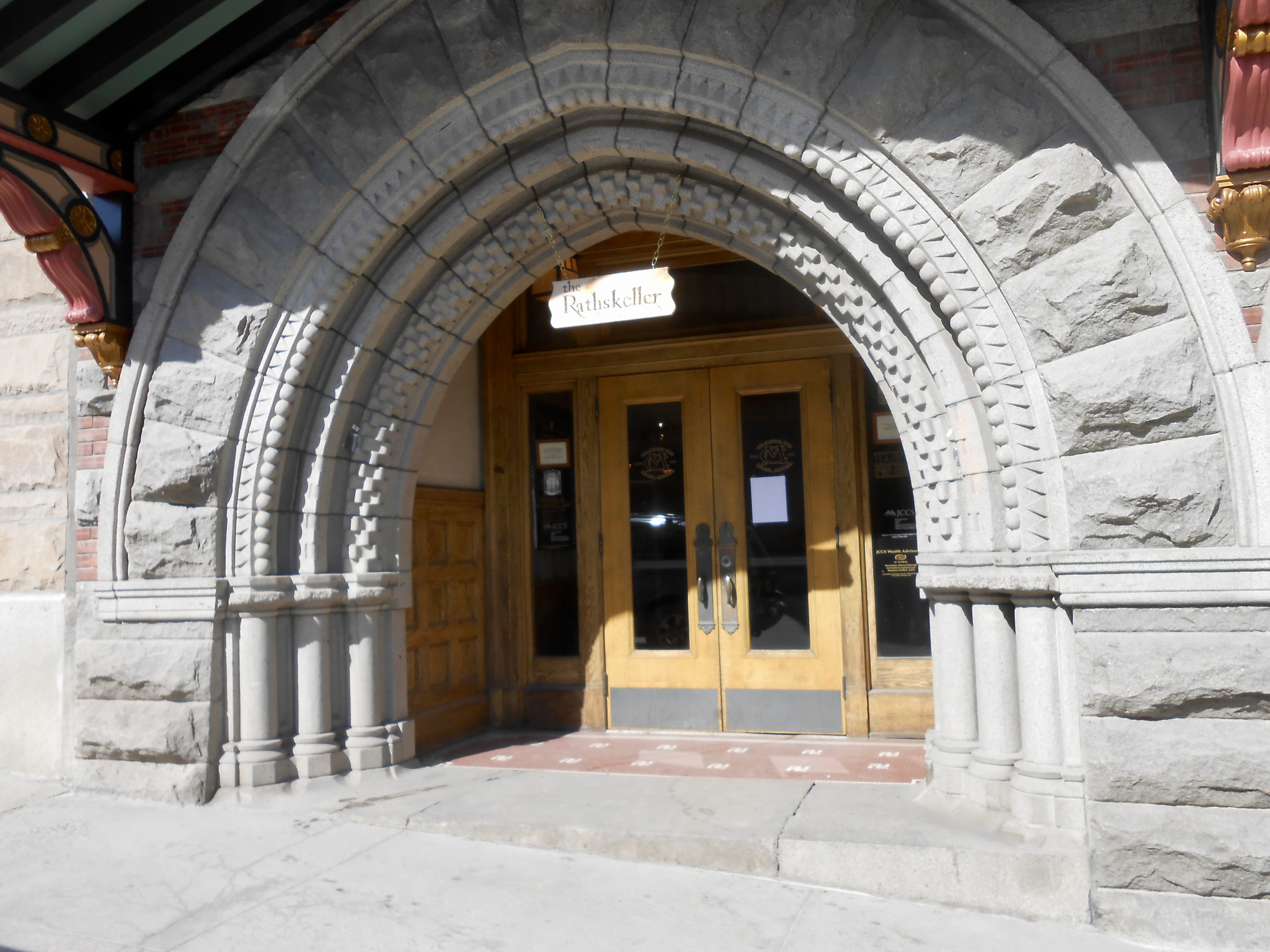
Surviving portion of the Montana Club, Helena, Montana, 1891-93.

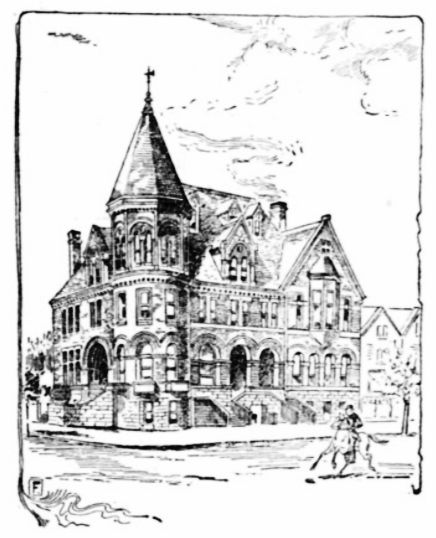
Boise City Hall, Boise, Idaho, 1892-93.

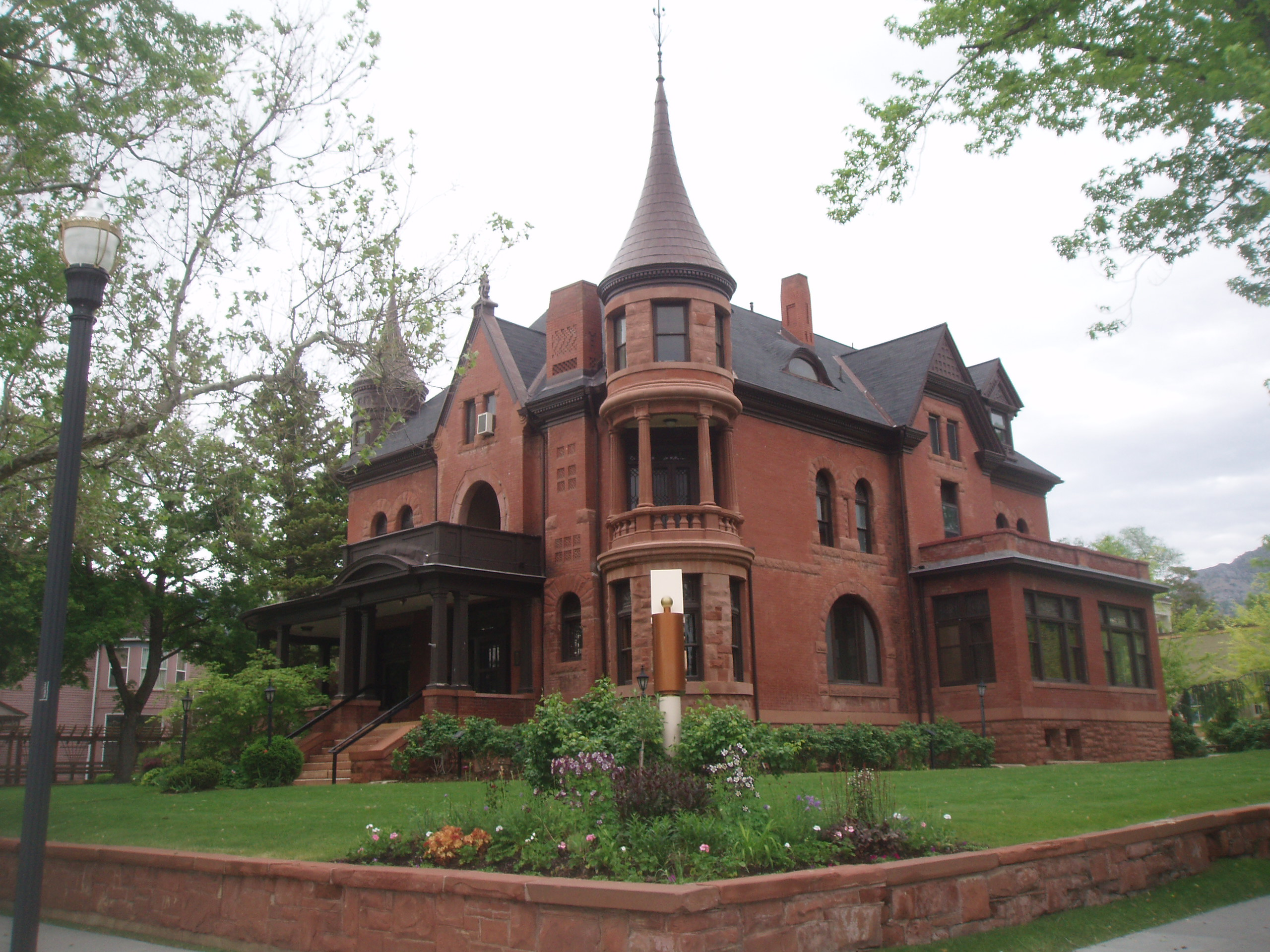
House for James C. Armstrong, Ogden, Utah, 1893.

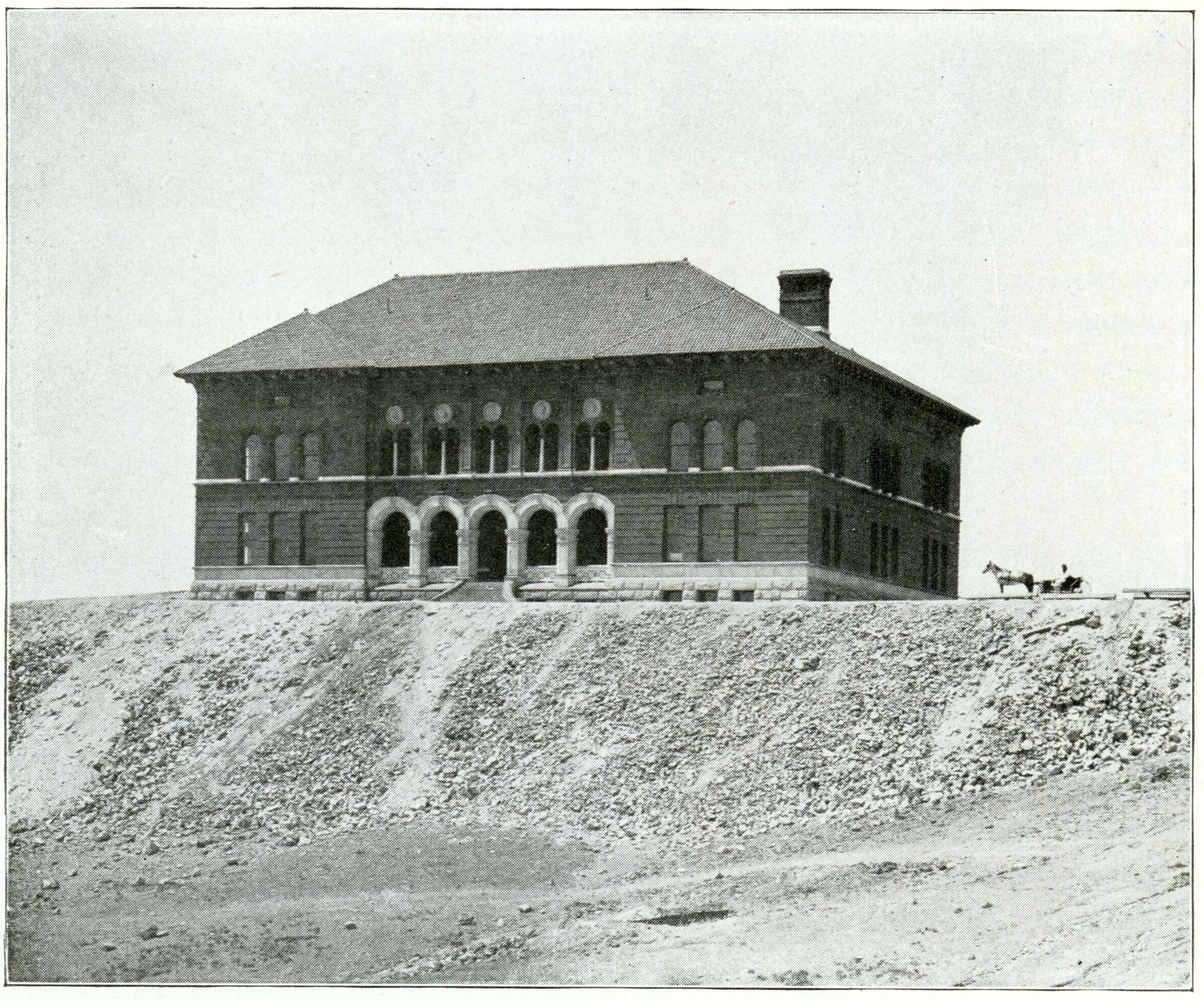
Main Hall, Montana Technological University, Butte, Montana, 1896-1900.

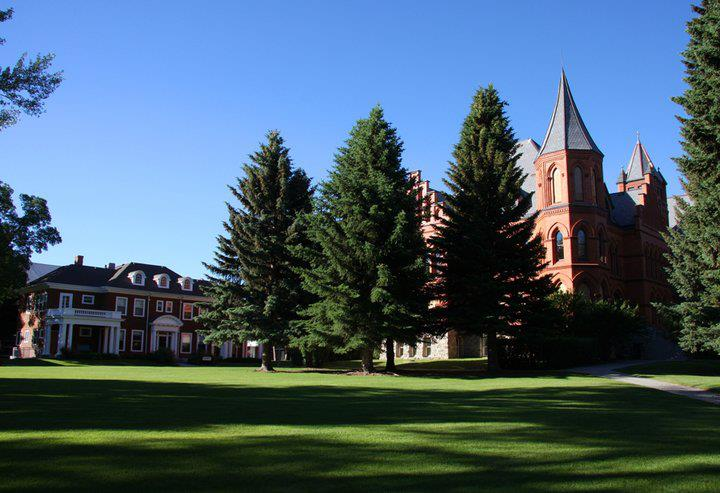
Main Hall, University of Montana Western, Dillon, Montana, 1896-97.

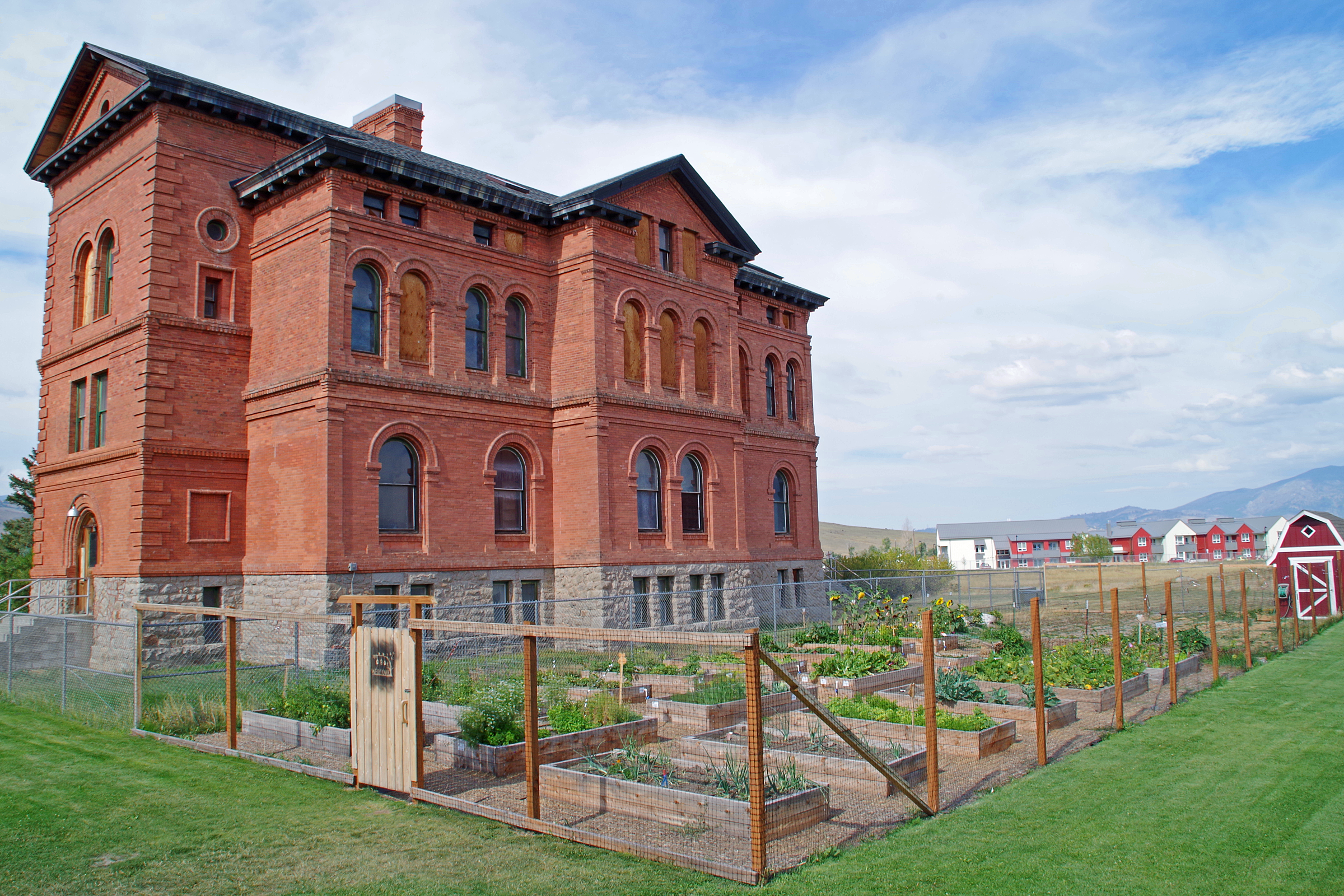
Montana Deaf and Dumb Asylum, Boulder, Colorado, 1896-98.

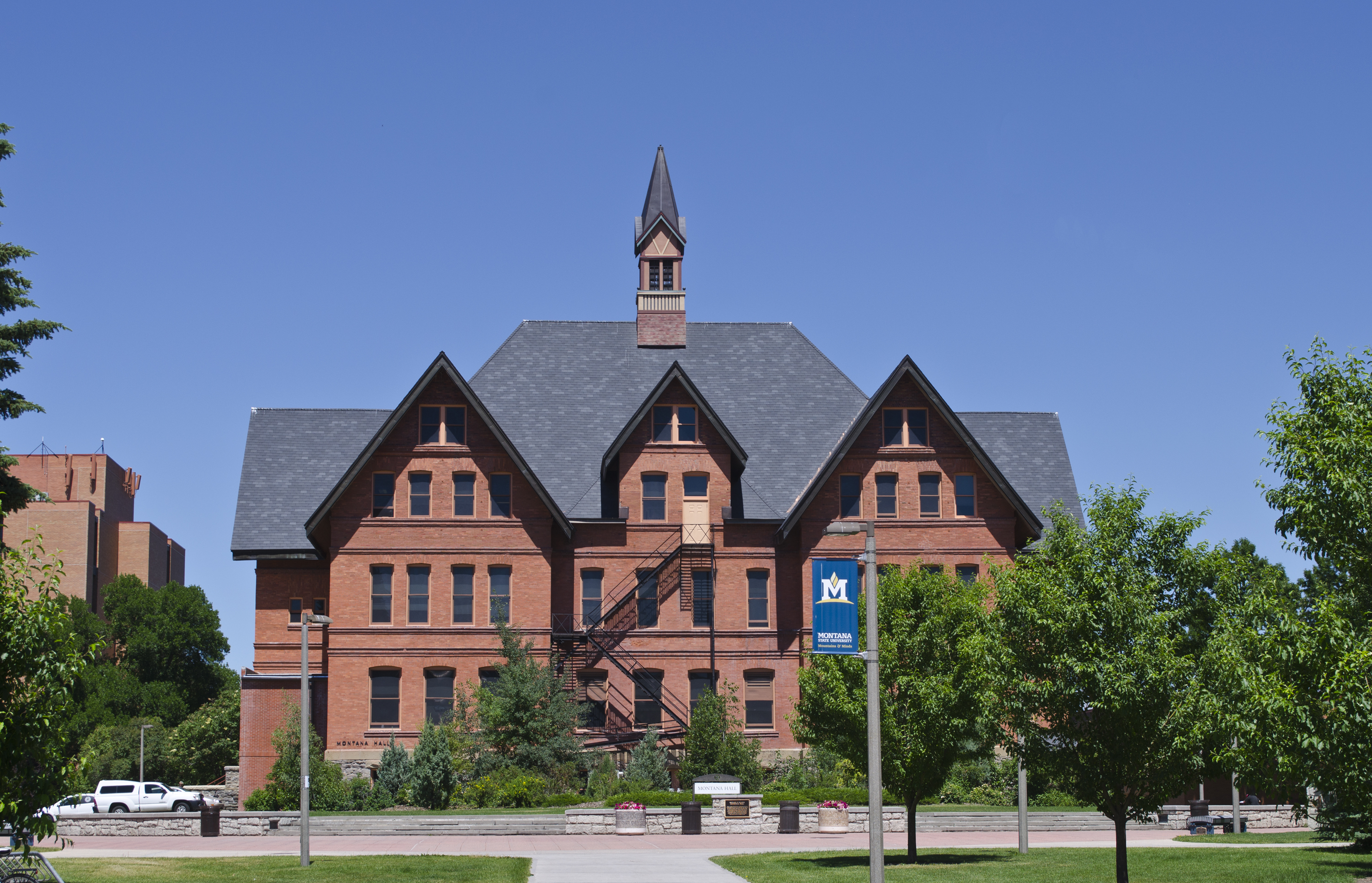
Montana Hall, Montana State University, Bozeman, Montana, 1896-98.
