= DLN (disambiguation) =

DLN may refer to:

- Deep lambertian networks
- The IATA code for Dillon Airport
- Driver's License Number
- DLN Series, of the original Mega Man series Robot Master
- ISO 639:dln or Darlong, an unclassified Sino-Tibetan language of India
