= Montana silver mining =

Silver-mining districts in Montana

Montana silver mining was a major industry in the 1800s following discovery of numerous silver deposits. Between 1883 and 1891 Montana was second every year to Colorado in silver production, except for 1887 when Montana was number one, producing approximately $15.5 million worth of silver. Major mining districts in Montana included Butte, which was home to many important mines such as the Lexington, Alice, and Moulton mines, and Philipsburg, which housed the Granite Mountain and Bimetallic mines. Other influential, but significantly smaller mines, operated at Helena and the Castle Mountains. The rapid raise and fall of these mines were due to largely geological and economic factors that created favorable conditions for a silver mining boom and subsequent bust. Montana continued to produce considerable silver through most of the 1900s, as a byproduct of copper production at Butte.

== Butte ==
Montana's leading silver district was Butte, which produced 716 million troy ounces of silver from 1880 through 2005. Butte began as a placer gold-mining district in 1864. In 1874, the United States Congress, stated that people needed to perform work on their gold claims or they would expire. The gold placers were largely exhausted, and Butte was becoming a ghost town, when silver ore was discovered, starting a rush to the district. Bill Farlin, who had gold claims in Butte, Montana, went to remove gold claims and found a silver vein. In 1883, the first rich copper vein was discovered, and copper mining at Butte proved to be much more profitable than silver mining. Also in 1883, the Northern Pacific Railroad laid tracks into Butte, greatly aiding the economics of mining on a large scale. Butte quickly became one of the world's leading copper districts, and made most of its silver as a byproduct of copper mining. Mining halted at Butte in 1983, but in 1986, Montana Resources LLP reopened the Continental open pit just east of Butte, and so silver continues to be produced at Butte, as a byproduct.

== Geology ==
The ore deposits in Montana were of very rich, but of very limited depth. Two factors contributed to this particular formation of the ores. The first of these factors were ascending hot waters traveling through fissures in the rocks and dropping their silver in chemically favorable zones. The second of these were descending cold waters trickling down the fissure veins, and moving and re-depositing the silver to further enrich the veins near the water table. These mines would prove to be extremely prosperous for a time, but due to the lack of depth would fade drastically as there simply weren't any high-grade silver zones below 1,000 feet (300 m).

== Economic conditions leading to boom ==
There were many economic factors, both local and national, that led to the massive silver boom in Montana. The first cause (on the national level), in response to miners calling for the government to subsidize silver, was the Bland–Allison Act of 1878. The act called for the government to purchase a limited amount of silver, $2 to $4 million, per month. This legislation served to appease silver miners, and it greatly stimulated silver mining as it created a substantial market for silver.

Within Montana, the introduction of railroads was a large factor in the silver boom. For one, railroads allowed for ores to be transported to outside smelters and markets much more cheaply than was previously possibly. Secondly, transportation made it much cheaper to build mills and smelters near the mines because a large-scale transportation of materials was economically feasible. For example, salt, which was an ingredient used in the roasting process, cost $120 per ton in Philipsburg in 1870 when it had to be transported by wagon, but the price fell to only $25 per ton in 1883 due to the introduction of railroads. Thanks to this improvement in transportation, and due to the subsequent availability of better technologies, the minimum value of ore per ton, at the Alta mine for example, dropped from $100 per ton to $12 per ton in order to be a success.

Due to the economic stimulus, improved transportation, and better technology, the profitability of the mines Montana soared. In 1889, Montana's smelting centers reported record numbers in tons of ores per day: Butte, 4000; Anaconda, 2500; Great Falls 1250; East Helena, 550; Glendale, 250; Wickes, 125; Argenta, 120. The two main producers of silver were Silver Bow County (the Butte district), which produced 43.2% of the state's silver, and Deer Lodge County (the Philipsburg district), which produced 35.6% of the state's silver. The following year, the Granite Mountain and Bimetallic mines in Philipsburg produced 4 million ounces of silver, and paid $2.5 million in dividends to stockholders.

Towards the end of the 1880s, silver prices began to fall because of the overproduction of silver. In order to continue the silver boom, the government passed the Sherman Silver Purchase Act in 1890. This act mandated that the government purchase a minimum of 4.5 million ounces of silver per month. The act caused silver prices to rise from US$0.935 per troy ounce in 1889 to US$1.21 per ounce in September 1890. Silver mining in Montana peaked in 1892, when Montana mines produced 19 million troy ounces of silver. In 1893, the last year of the silver boom, major mines in Montana produced the following amounts of silver (in millions of troy ounces): Butte 3.7; Alta 2.8; Granite-Bimetallic 2.4.

== Decline of silver mining ==
Although the United States was on the gold standard, the increased coinage of silver under the Sherman Silver Purchase Act was driving gold coins out of circulation, and drew US Treasury gold reserves down to a low level. After the Panic of 1893, which was partly blamed on an overabundance of silver coinage, President Grover Cleveland called an emergency session of Congress, which repealed the Sherman Silver Purchase Act. This caused the amount of silver purchased to drop abruptly.

In Montana, many silver orebodies contained silver-enriched zones restricted to within a thousand feet of the surface, as shallow as a few hundred feet at some mines. Once mining went below the silver enriched zones, the silver content decreased dramatically. The majority of the deeper ores contained a high percentage of zinc, which was very costly because smelters charged a penalty of 50 cents per for each percent of zinc content in the silver that exceeded 12%. As the zinc content approached and exceeded 30 percent, the ore became uneconomic to mine.

Lower silver grade, increased zinc, and the increased expenses of pumping water from the deeper mine levels forced the Elkhorn mine to close down in 1894. The Granite-Bimetallic mines shut down in September 1893 because they had exhausted the ore. Additionally, the Alice, Lexington, Moulton, Alta, and Comet mines closed between 1893 and 1897 because of low silver prices following repeal of the Sherman Act. Some mines, such as the Hope and Castle mines, were able to remain open into the early 1890s due to the discoveries of new orebodies, but they had little success.

== Montana silver prospers as a byproduct ==
Despite the closure of silver mines, silver production continued as a byproduct. The copper mines at Butte, which produced considerable silver along with the copper, continued to prosper regardless of the price of silver. In the mid-1900s, the zinc which was a costly nuisance in the 1890s became valuable, and the deep levels of old silver mines became zinc mines, and produced the silver as a byproduct.
