= Higgins Block =

Higgins Block may refer to:

- Higgins Block (Lexington, Kentucky), listed on the National Register of Historic Places in Fayette County, Kentucky
- Higgins Block (Missoula, Montana), listed on the National Register of Historic Places in Missoula County, Montana
