= Montana Club =

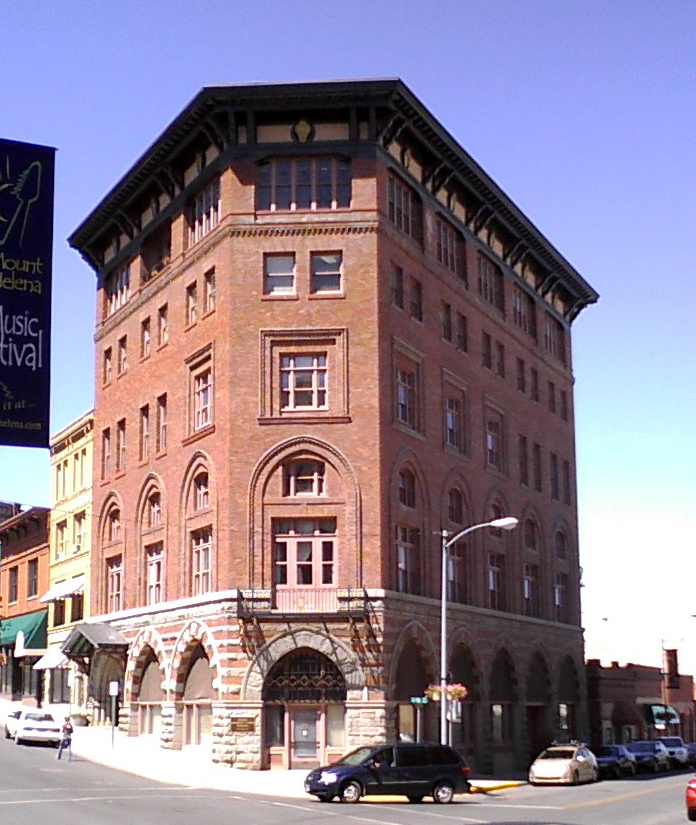
The Montana Club, designed by Gilbert & Carsley.

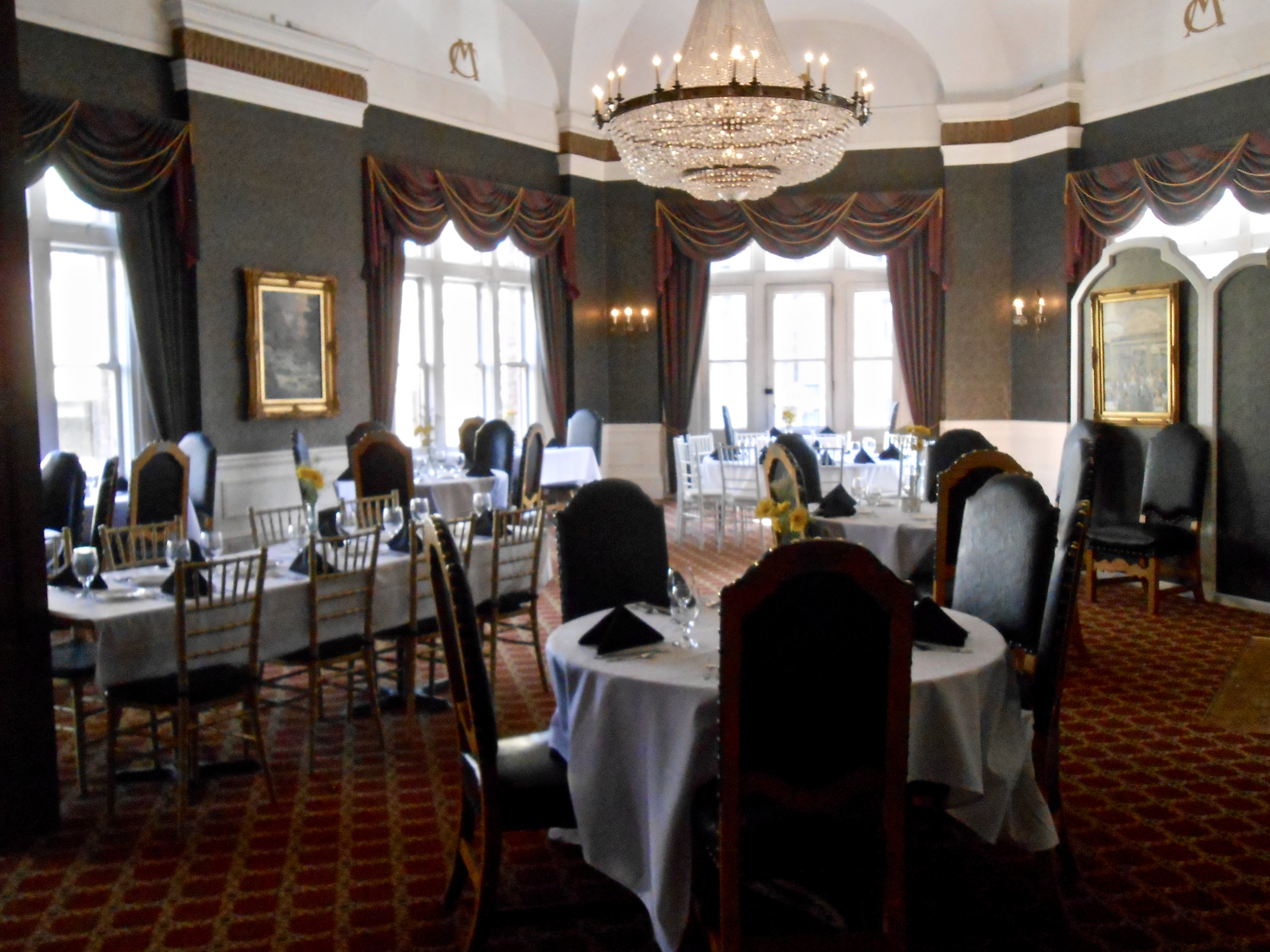
Members' Dining Room

The Montana Club is a historic building in Helena, Montana, U.S., part of the Helena Historic District, completed in 1905. It contains a restaurant and bar as well as meeting rooms and private businesses. The bar and restaurant were originally part of a private, traditional gentlemen's club established in 1885. The Montana Club was the longest-continuously open private club between Minneapolis and Seattle until it reorganized in June 2018 as a co-operative association and opened to the public for dining, as well as private meetings, celebrations and business gatherings.

== History ==
The Montana Club was founded in 1885 by a group of 130 men, mostly from Montana Territory for "literary, mutual improvement & social purposes. Members assembled in various locations throughout downtown Helena until 1891 when they purchased a triangular-shaped plot of land owned by Samuel Thomas Hauser to build a traditional style gentlemen’s club. The first building, designed by architects John C. Paulsen and John LaValle, was built in 1891-1893.

The building was set on fire in 1903 and all but the first floor was so severely damaged the building was declared a total loss. The fire was set by the 14-year-old son of the bartender, a boy who had started previous fires, and who actually rode to the site with the firefighters, later explaining his motive "was to have the horses [that pulled the fire engine] run." The boy was sent to reform school for the offense, but his father kept his job at the club for several more decades.

A new building, built with terracotta, was designed by architects Cass Gilbert and George H. Carsley. It was built on the footprint of the old building, and some of the first floor structure was salvageable. Its construction cost more than $120,000. The new building replicated the old clubhouse's floor plan added a rathskeller and dining room or banquet hall. The granite arches were totally dismantled, inventoried and set aside for potential incorporation into the new structure. The new building was constructed using brick manufactured by the Western Clay Mfg. Co. (Kessler Brick Co.), recycling some of the granite from the original building, augmented with new granite from the nearby Baxendale quarry.

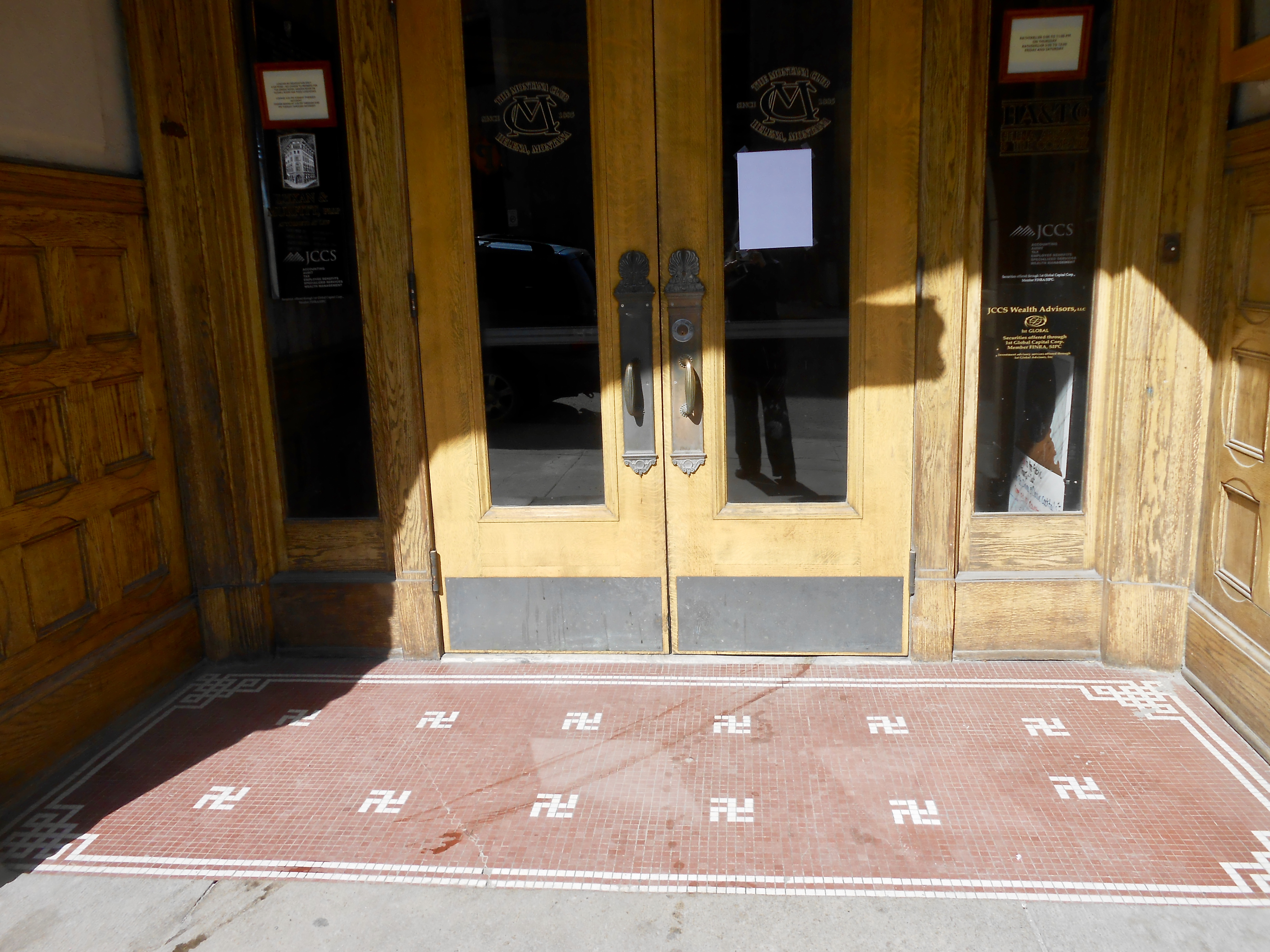
The controversial entryway floor

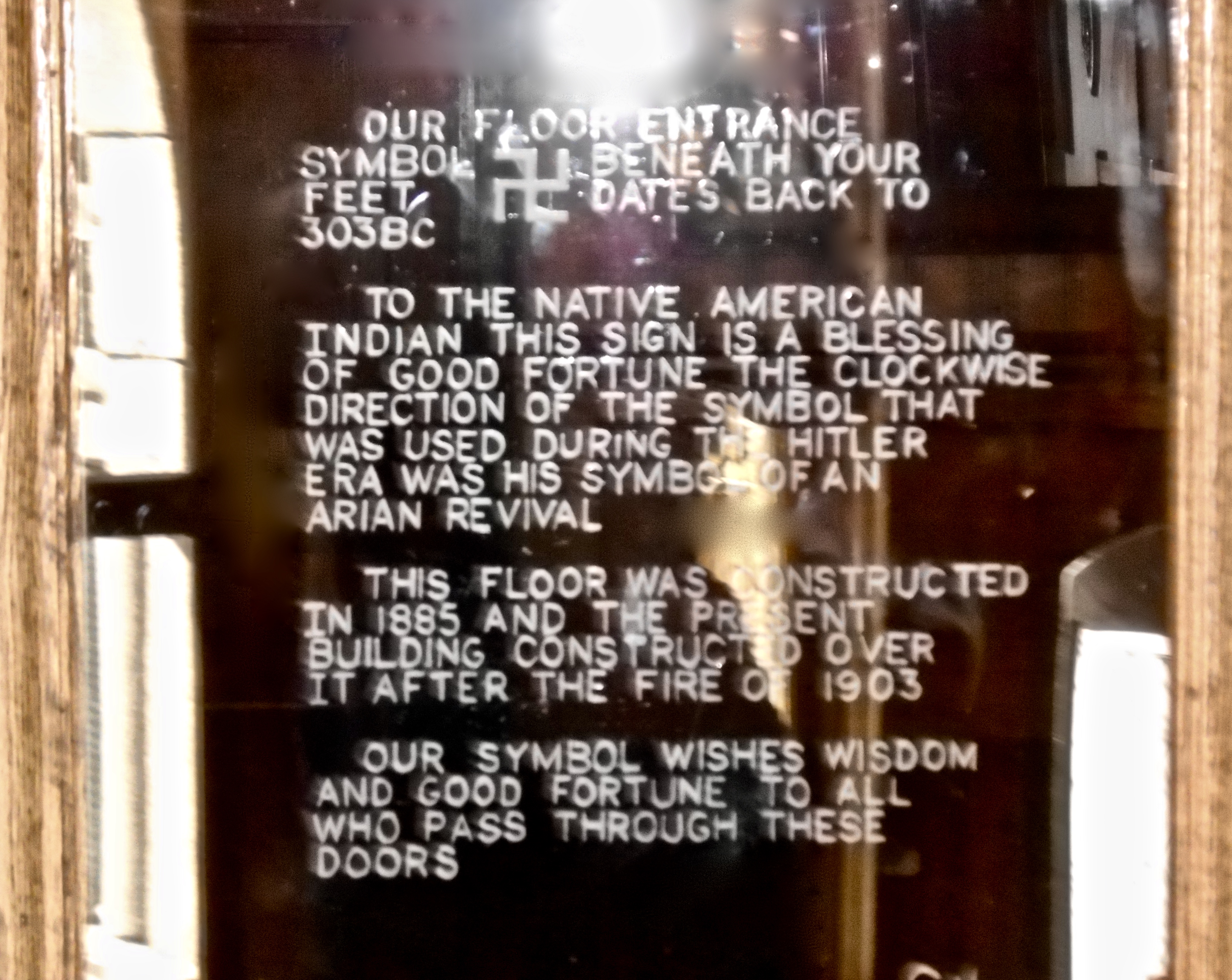
Etched class statement on interior front door, explaining the swastika pattern

The entryway of the original structure was preserved in the rebuild, and became a subject of some controversy many years later on account of the counter-clockwise swastika designs embedded into mosaic tiles on the floor. The design as installed in the 1893 building was derived from Native American symbolism and intended to represent friendship, good luck or well-being, as opposed to the later meaning given to the clockwise-oriented symbol adopted by the Third Reich. Though the floor was carpeted over for many years and the design beneath largely forgotten, the management of the building ultimately chose to allow the floor to be visible and use it as a tool to teach how the meaning of a symbol could change over time.

In 1980, the building’s ownership was split up and several different owners controlled various parts of the building. The club itself became a legal entity, the Montana Club Building Condominium Owners Association.

In 2018, the Club reorganized as a co-operative association and opened to the public for dining, as well as private meetings, celebrations and business gatherings. The structure had four owners, and in October 2022, three of them sued the fourth, the cooperative, for unpaid assessments. On November 3, 2023, the Original Montana Club Cooperative Association filed for voluntary Chapter 11 bankruptcy protection to avert foreclosure. The management announced that they would remain open and continue serving guests during the bankruptcy procedure. However, they closed shortly thereafter, announcing a reopening for one night only on March 29, 2024 for the purpose of selling the remaining liquor in the bar to raise funds to pay the insurance policy.
