= KDBM =

- Dillon, Montana; United States
- Frequency: 1490 kHz
- Branding: 1490 AM

Programming
- Format: Country

Ownership
- Owner: Dead-Air Broadcasting Company, Inc.
- Sister stations: KBEV-FM

History
- First air date: 1957
- Former call signs: KDBI, KDLN

Technical information
- Licensing authority: FCC
- Facility ID: 4487
- Class: C
- Power: 1000 watts (unlimited)
- Transmitter coordinates: 45°14′10.5″N 112°38′48.5″W

Links
- Public license information: Public file; LMS
- Website: kdbm-kbev.com

KDBM (1490 AM) is a radio station licensed to serve Dillon, Montana. The station is owned by Dead-Air Broadcasting Company, Inc. It airs a full-service Country music format.

The station was assigned the KDBM call letters by the Federal Communications Commission on April 1, 1988.

In addition to its usual music programming, the station carries selected local high school and college sporting events.
