= Maverick Mountain Ski Area =

Ski area in Montana, United States

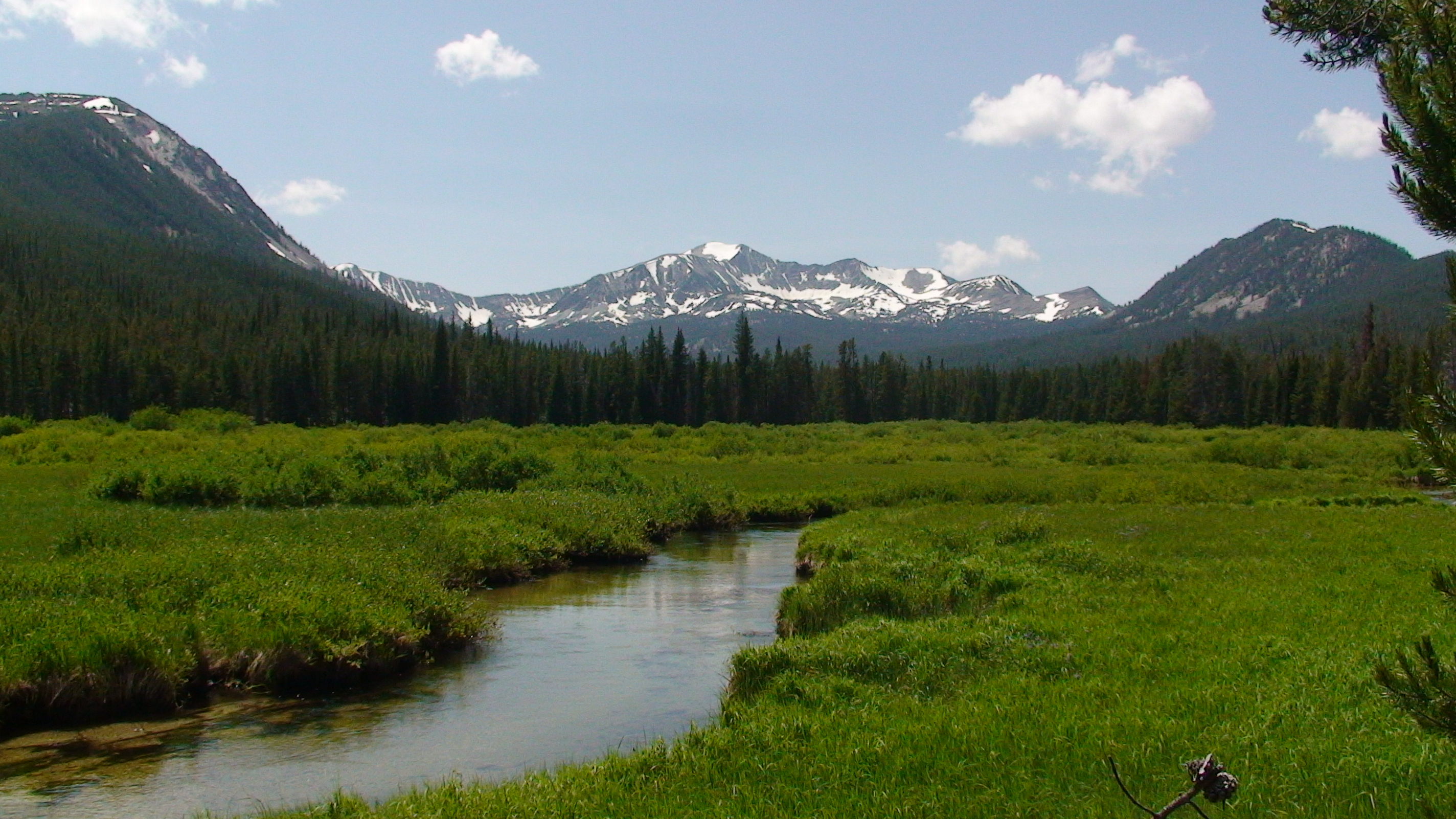
- View of Pioneer Mountains

- Location in Montana Maverick Mountain Ski Area (the United States)
- Location: Polaris, Montana
- Nearest city: Dillon, Montana
- Coordinates: 45°26′06″N 113°07′46″W
- Vertical: 1,750 ft (530 m)
- Top elevation: 8,250 ft (2,510 m)
- Base elevation: 6,500 ft (2,000 m)
- Skiable area: 210 acres (0.85 km^{2})
- Trails: 24
- Longest run: 2 mi (3.2 km)
- Lift system: 1 Double, 1 Handle Tow
- Snowfall: 180"
- Website: Official website

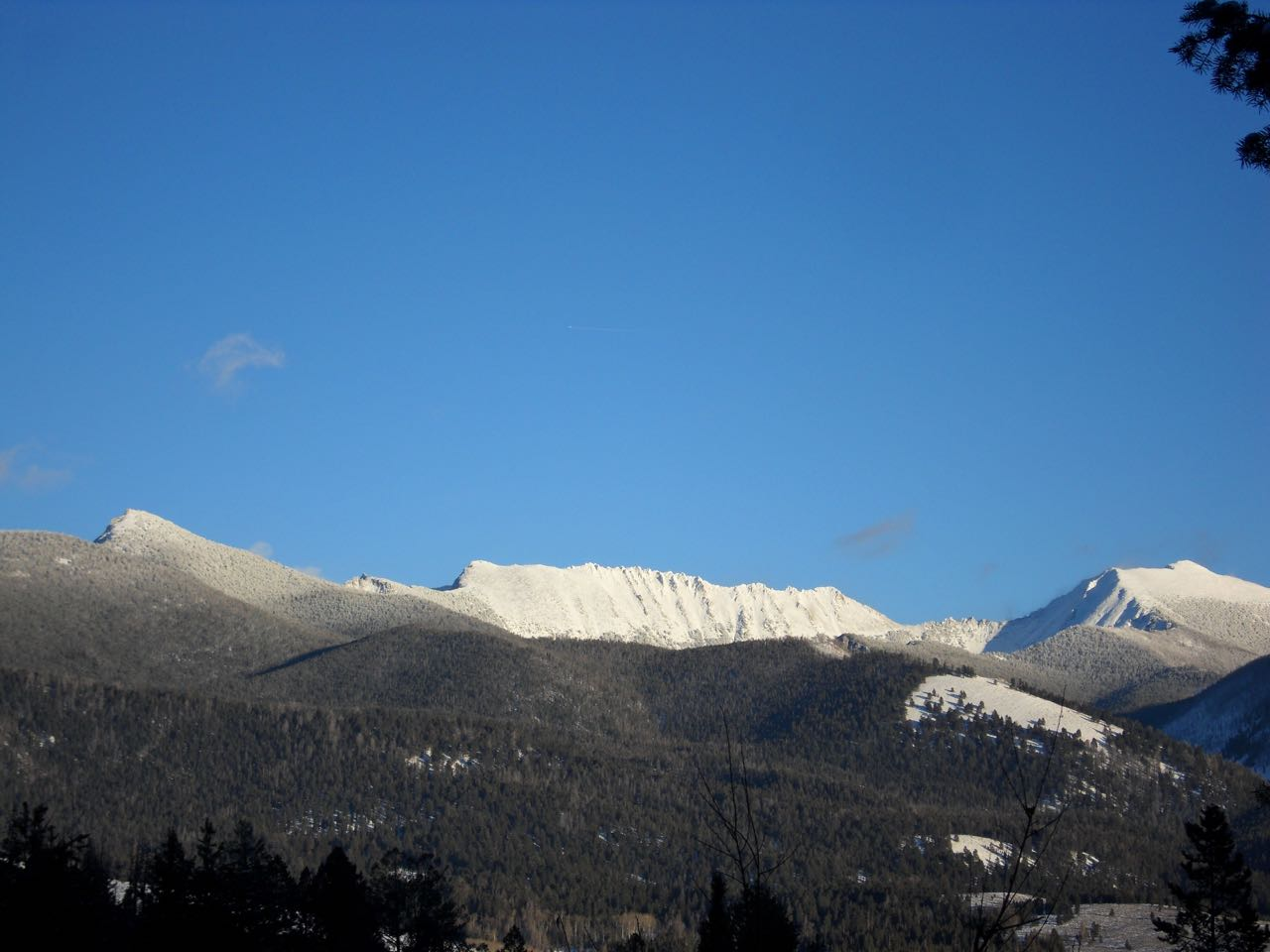
The western aspect of the eastern Pioneer Range, as seen from Maverick.

Maverick Mountain Ski Area is an alpine ski area located in the Beaverhead National Forest in southwestern Montana. It is about 40 miles (64 km) from Dillon, Montana and is just off the Pioneer Mountain Scenic Byway in Polaris. There are 24 runs. The Mountain rates its trails as 27% beginner, 37% intermediate, 18% advanced, and 18% expert. There is also a network of cross-country trails.

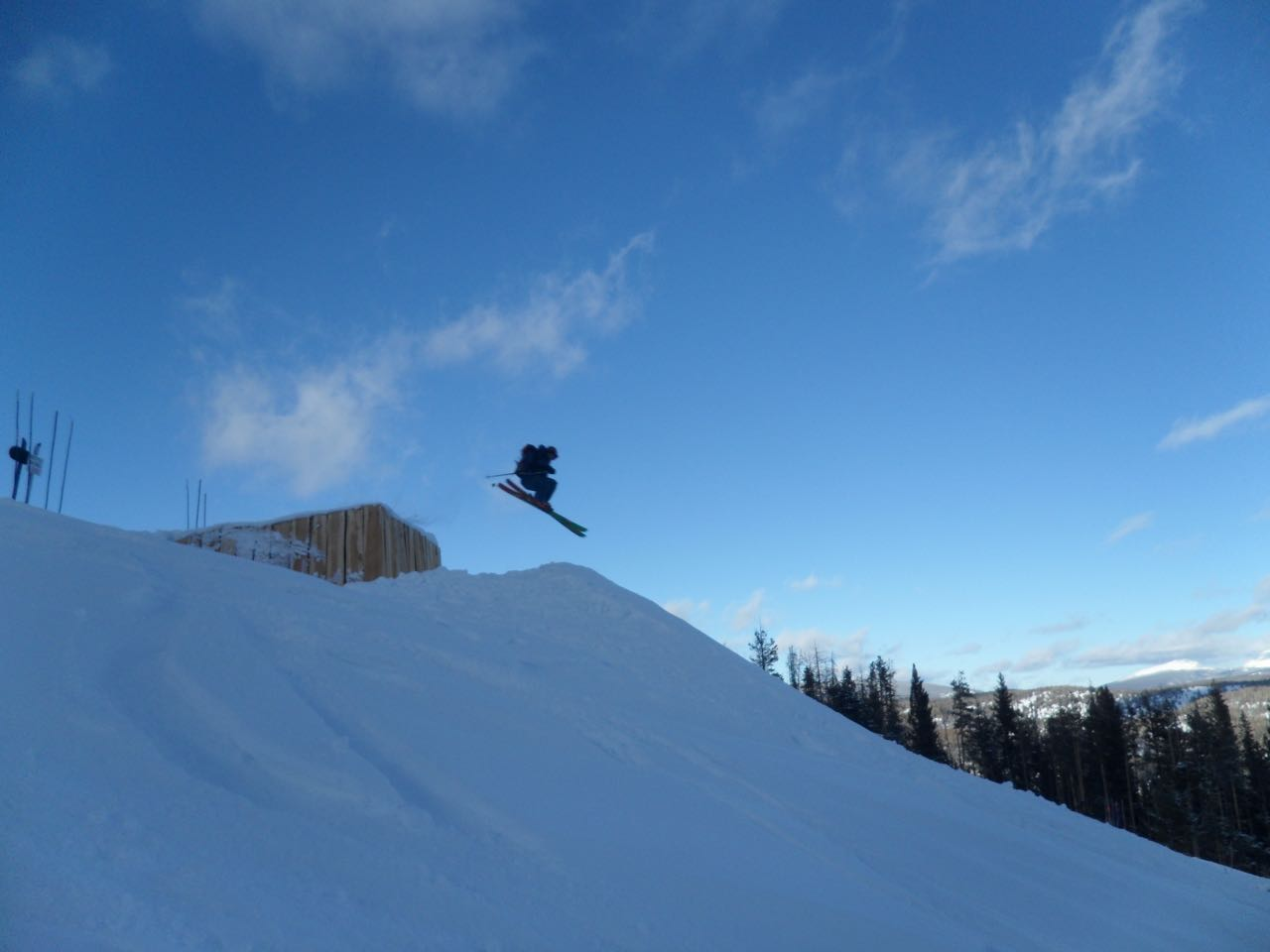
The Log Cabin jump at Maverick Mountain
