= KBEV-FM =

- Dillon, Montana; United States
- Frequency: 98.3 MHz
- Branding: Greatest Hits 98.3 FM

Programming
- Format: Adult contemporary

Ownership
- Owner: Dead-Air Broadcasting Company
- Sister stations: KDBM

History
- First air date: August 1972 (as KDBM-FM)
- Former call signs: KDBM-FM (1972–1978); KDLN (1978–1988); KDBM-FM (1988–1998)
- Call sign meaning: BEaVer

Technical information
- Licensing authority: FCC
- Facility ID: 4486
- Class: C3
- ERP: 10,500 watts horizontal; 100,000 watts vertical
- HAAT: 151 meters (496 feet)
- Transmitter coordinates: 45°14′22″N 112°40′03″W
- Translator: 93.3 K227BM (Sheridan)

Links
- Public license information: Public file; LMS
- Website: www.kdbm-kbev.com

KBEV-FM (98.3 FM) is a radio station licensed to serve Dillon, Montana. The station is owned by Dead-Air Broadcasting Company. It airs an adult contemporary music format.

The station was assigned the KBEV-FM call letters by the Federal Communications Commission on April 1, 1998.

In addition to its usual music programming, the station carries selected local high school and college sporting events.

== Translators ==
Broadcast translator for KBEV-FM
Call sign	Frequency	City of license	FID	ERP (W)	Class	FCC info
K227BM	93.3 FM	Sheridan, Montana	142893	250	D	LMS
