= Jefferson County Courthouse (Montana) =

- U.S. National Register of Historic Places
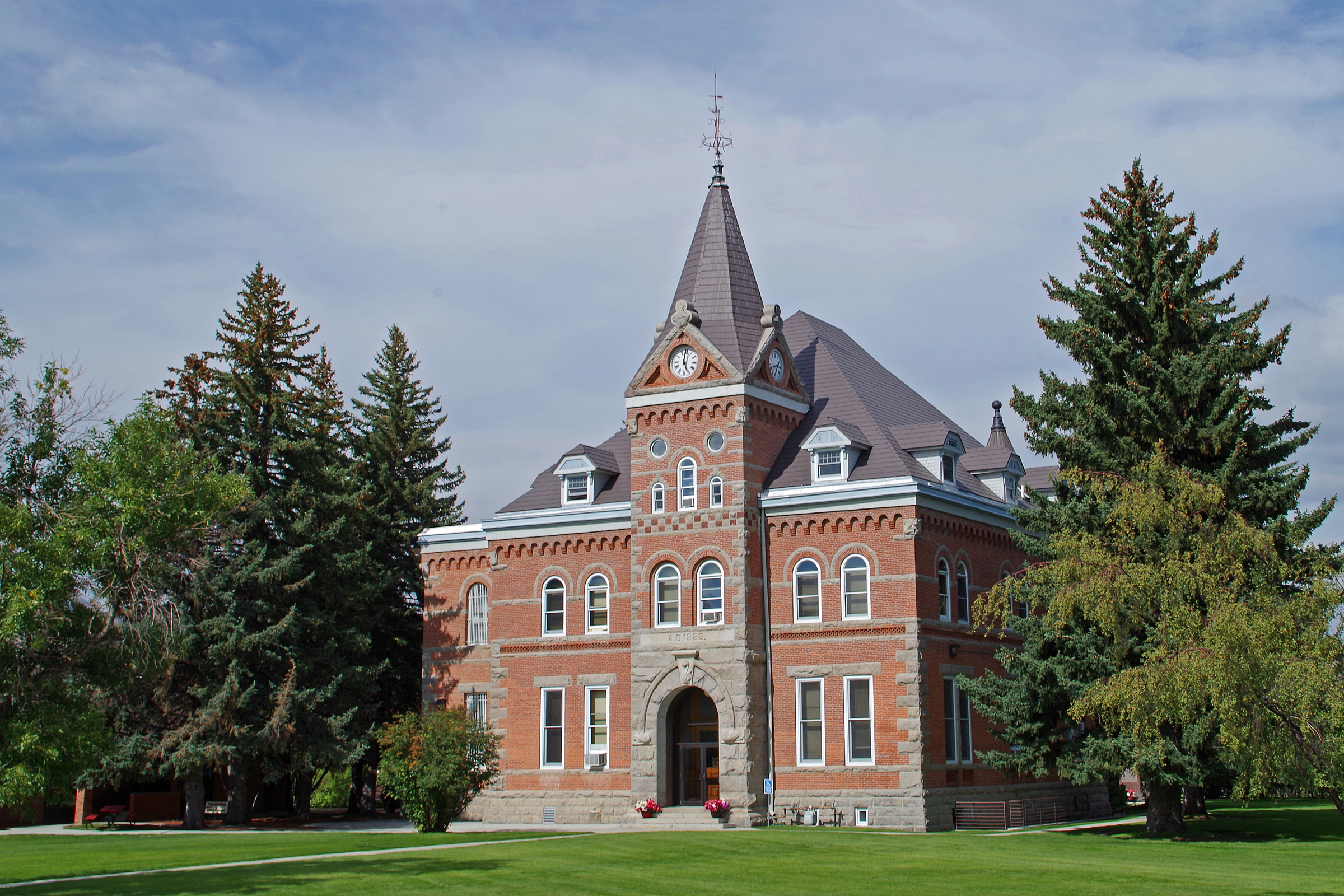

- Location within Montana Location within the United States
- Interactive map showing the location of Jefferson County Courthouse
- Location: 200 Centennial Ave.
- Coordinates: 46°14′09″N 112°07′16″W
- Architect: John C. Paulsen
- Architectural style: Richardsonian Romanesque
- NRHP reference No.: 80002422
- Added to NRHP: August 6, 1980

Jefferson County Courthouse is a site on the National Register of Historic Places located in Boulder, Montana. It was added to the Register on August 6, 1980.

The building was authorized with a $40,000 bond issue in 1888 and was completed in 1889. The architect selected to design the building was John Paulsen, a German immigrant. The contractor was J.S. McKenzie. The design was a two-story Richardsonian Romanesque style built with local granite and locally manufactured brick, with a square tower with an octagonal spire and two turrets. Design elements drawn from the Middle Ages included gargoyles on each corner of the building, just under the eaves. The interior of the building has extensive carved woodwork. Today is one of the oldest courthouses in Montana still being used as such.
