= Montana Deaf and Dumb Asylum =

- U.S. National Register of Historic Places
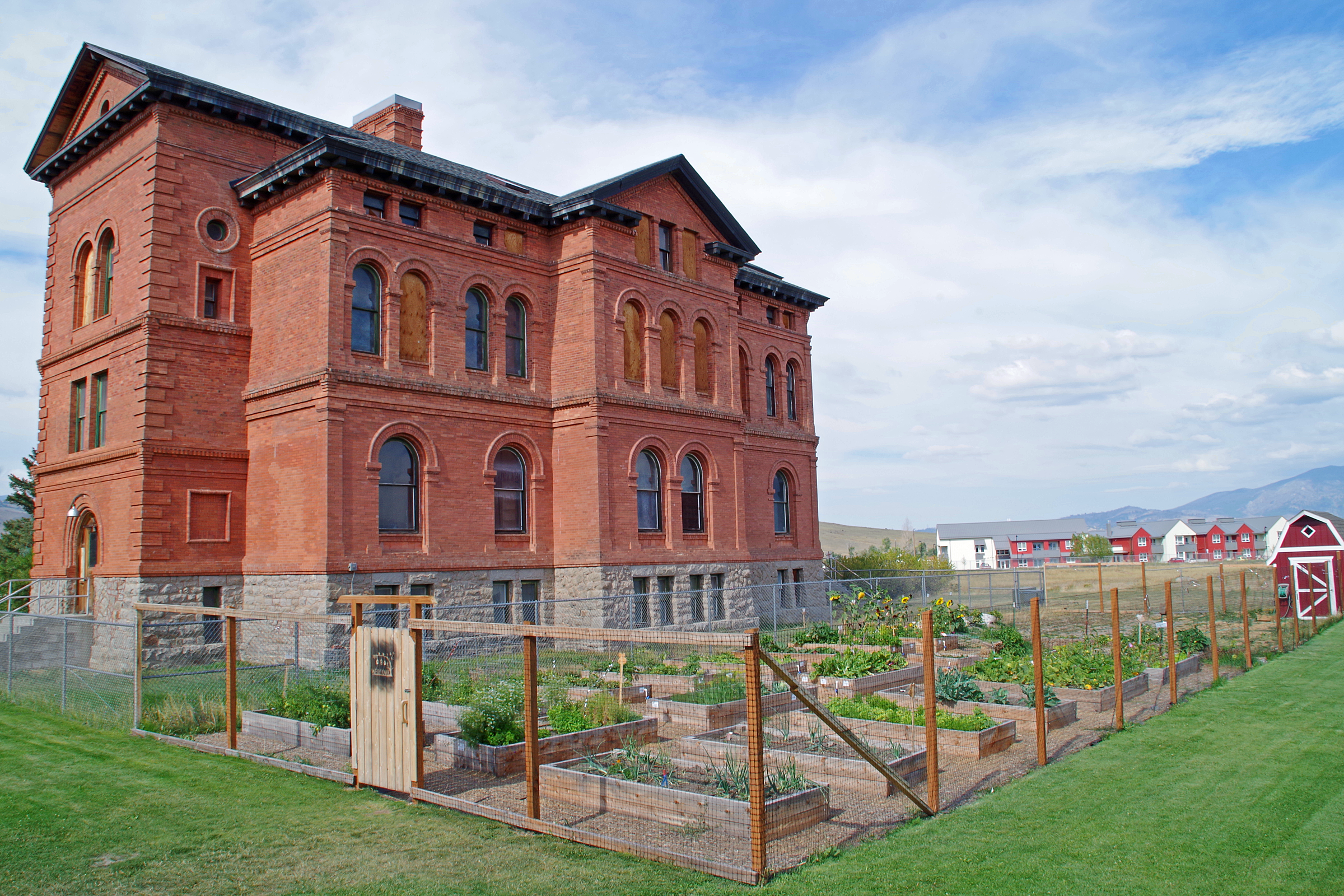

- Location within Montana Location within the United States
- Location: Off Montana Highway 69, Boulder, Montana
- Coordinates: 46°13′52″N 112°08′24″W
- Area: 4 acres (1.6 ha)
- Built: 1893
- Built by: Suite, John
- Architect: John C. Paulsen
- Architectural style: Renaissance, Italianate
- NRHP reference No.: 85000994
- Added to NRHP: May 10, 1985

The Montana Deaf and Dumb Asylum is a site on the National Register of Historic Places located in Boulder, Montana. It was added to the Register on May 10, 1985.
