= Deep lambertian networks =

Deep Lambertian Networks (DLN) is a combination of Deep belief network and Lambertian reflectance assumption which deals with the challenges posed by illumination variation in visual perception. Lambertian Reflectance model gives an illumination invariant representation which can be used for recognition. The Lambertian reflectance model is widely used for modeling illumination variations and is a good approximation for diffuse object surfaces. The DLN is a hybrid undirected-directed generative model that combines DBNs with the Lambertian reflectance model.

In the DLN, the visible layer consists of image pixel intensities v ∈ R^{N_{v}}, where N_{v} is the number of pixels in the image. For every pixel i there are two latent variables namely the albedo and surface normal. GRBMs are used to model the albedo and surface normals.

Combining Deep Belief Nets with the Lambertian reflectance assumption, the model can learn good priors over the albedo from 2D images. Illumination variations can be explained by changing only the lighting latent variable. By transferring learned knowledge from similar objects, albedo and surface normals estimation from a single image is also possible. Experiments demonstrate that this model is able to generalize as well as improve over standard baselines in one-shot face recognition.

The model has been successfully applied in reconstruction of shadows facial images, given any set of lighting conditions. The model has also been tested on non-living objects. The method outperforms most other methods and is faster than them.
