= Argenta, Montana =

- Census-designated place
- Location within Montana Location within the United States
- Coordinates: 45°16′43″N 112°51′38″W
- Country: United States
- State: Montana
- County: Beaverhead

Area
  - Total: 0.30 sq mi (0.77 km^{2})
  - Land: 0.30 sq mi (0.77 km^{2})
  - Water: 0 sq mi (0.00 km^{2})
- Elevation: 6,129 ft (1,868 m)

Population (2020)
  - Total: 35
  - Density: 117.5/sq mi (45.35/km^{2})
- Time zone: UTC-7 (Mountain (MST))
  - Summer (DST): UTC-6 (MDT)
- ZIP Code: 59725 (Dillon)
- Area code: 406
- FIPS code: 30-02350
- GNIS feature ID: 2804241

Argenta is an unincorporated community and census-designated place (CDP) in Beaverhead County, Montana, United States. It is in southwestern Montana, 13 miles (21 km) northwest of Dillon, the Beaverhead county seat. Argenta is in the valley of Rattlesnake Creek, a southeast-flowing tributary of the Beaverhead River, part of the Jefferson River watershed leading to the Missouri and finally the Mississippi River.

Argenta was first listed as a CDP prior to the 2020 census. As of the 2020 census, Argenta had a population of 35.

== Demographics ==
Historical population
Census	Pop.	Note	%±
2020	35		—
U.S. Decennial Census
