= Dillon Airport =

- IATA: DLN; ICAO: KDLN; FAA LID: DLN

Summary
- Airport type: Public
- Owner: Beaverhead County
- Serves: Dillon, Montana
- Elevation AMSL: 5,245 ft (1,599 m)
- Coordinates: 45°15′19″N 112°33′09″W
- Interactive map of Dillon Airport

Runways
Direction	Length		Surface
Direction	ft	m	Surface
17/35	6,501	1,982	Asphalt
4/22	3,600	1,097	Asphalt

Statistics (2019)
- Aircraft operations (year ending 6/24/2019): 5,448
- Based aircraft: 15
- Source: Federal Aviation Administration

Dillon Airport (IATA: DLN, ICAO: KDLN, FAA LID: DLN) is a county-owned airport five miles northeast of Dillon, in Beaverhead County, Montana.

== Facilities ==
Dillon Airport covers 202 acres (82 ha) at an elevation of 5,245 feet (1,599 m). It has two asphalt runways: 17/35 is 6,501 by 75 feet (1,982 x 23 m) and 4/22 is 3,600 by 60 feet (1,097 x 18 m).

In the year ending June 24, 2019, the airport had 5,448 aircraft operations, average 104 per week: 83% general aviation, 16% air taxi and <1% military. 15 aircraft were then based at this airport, 14 single-engine and 1 helicopter.

== Incidents ==
- On May 3, 2007, a Cessna Citation II operated by Hamilton Ranches Inc. crashed on approach to DLV because of an inflight loss of control for undetermined reasons. Both occupants were killed.

== See also ==
- List of airports in Montana
