= John Lavalle =

American architect

- Died: 1916
- Occupation: Architect
- Relatives: Curtis Guild Jr. (brother-in-law)

John Lavalle (died 1916) was an American architect. He designed buildings in Maine, Massachusetts, Montana, and New Hampshire, including three cottages in Islesboro, Maine in 1898-1890, and the Amory House in Dublin, New Hampshire in 1898-1899 (later listed on the National Register of Historic Places).
