= Bertha Eccles Community Art Center =

Historic residence in Ogden, Utah, United States

- Eccles Community Art Center
- U.S. National Register of Historic Places
- U.S. Historic district – Contributing property
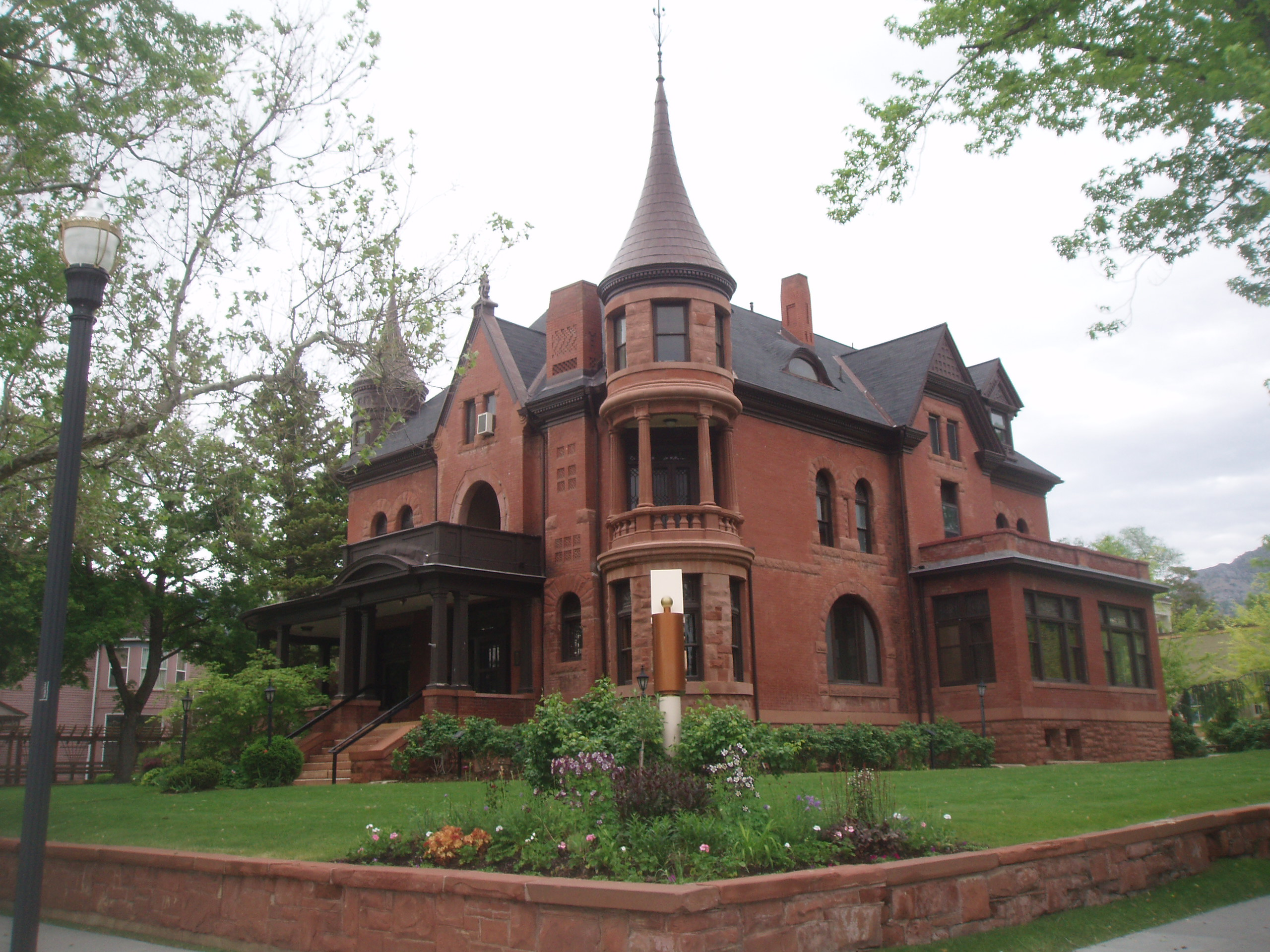
- Bertha Eccles Art Center, May 2009

- Location within Utah Location within the United States Location within the United States
- Location: 2580 Jefferson Avenue; Ogden, Utah; United States
- Coordinates: 41°13′07″N 111°57′50″W
- Area: 0.6 acres (0.24 ha)
- Built: 1893
- Architectural style: Late Victorian
- Part of: Jefferson Avenue Historic District (ID98001214)
- NRHP reference No.: 71000865

Significant dates
- Added to NRHP: May 14, 1971
- Designated CP: September 25, 1998

The Eccles Community Art Center (also known as the Eccles Art Center or Bertha Eccles Hall), is a historic residence within the Jefferson Avenue Historic District in Ogden, Utah, United States, that is individually listed on the National Register of Historic Places, (NRHP).

== Description ==
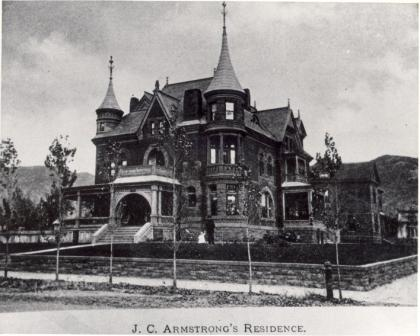
J.C. Armstrong's House, in the 1890s

The Eccles Art Center, located at 2580 Jefferson Avenue, was built in 1893. It is a red brick and red sandstone Victorian home built for mining and banking businessman James C. Armstrong, who sold it in 1896 to the David Eccles family.

It was listed on the NRHP May 14, 1971. The Building is now used as a community art center and gallery, and is open to the public for visits and tours.

== See also ==
- National Register of Historic Places listings in Weber County, Utah
