= Dillon, Montana =

City in Beaverhead County, Montana, United States

- City
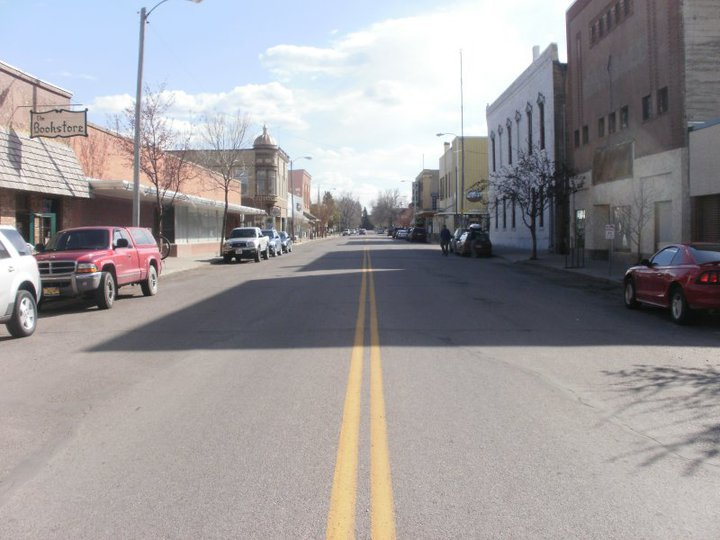
- Business District of Dillon

- Seal

- Location of Dillon, Montana
- Coordinates: 45°13′32″N 112°37′38″W
- Country: United States
- State: Montana
- County: Beaverhead

Government
  - Mayor: Michael Klakken

Area
  - Total: 1.90 sq mi (4.92 km^{2})
  - Land: 1.90 sq mi (4.92 km^{2})
  - Water: 0 sq mi (0.00 km^{2})
- Elevation: 5,095 ft (1,553 m)

Population (2020)
  - Total: 3,880
  - Density: 2,044.1/sq mi (789.25/km^{2})
- Time zone: UTC−7 (Mountain (MST))
  - Summer (DST): UTC−6 (MDT)
- ZIP code: 59725
- Area code: 406
- FIPS code: 30-20800
- GNIS feature ID: 2410340
- Website: www.dillonmt.org

Dillon is a city in and the county seat of Beaverhead County, Montana, United States. The population was 3,880 at the 2020 census. The city was named for Sidney Dillon (1812–1892), president of Union Pacific Railroad. The Dillon City Hall Historic District is listed on the National Register of Historic Places.

== History ==
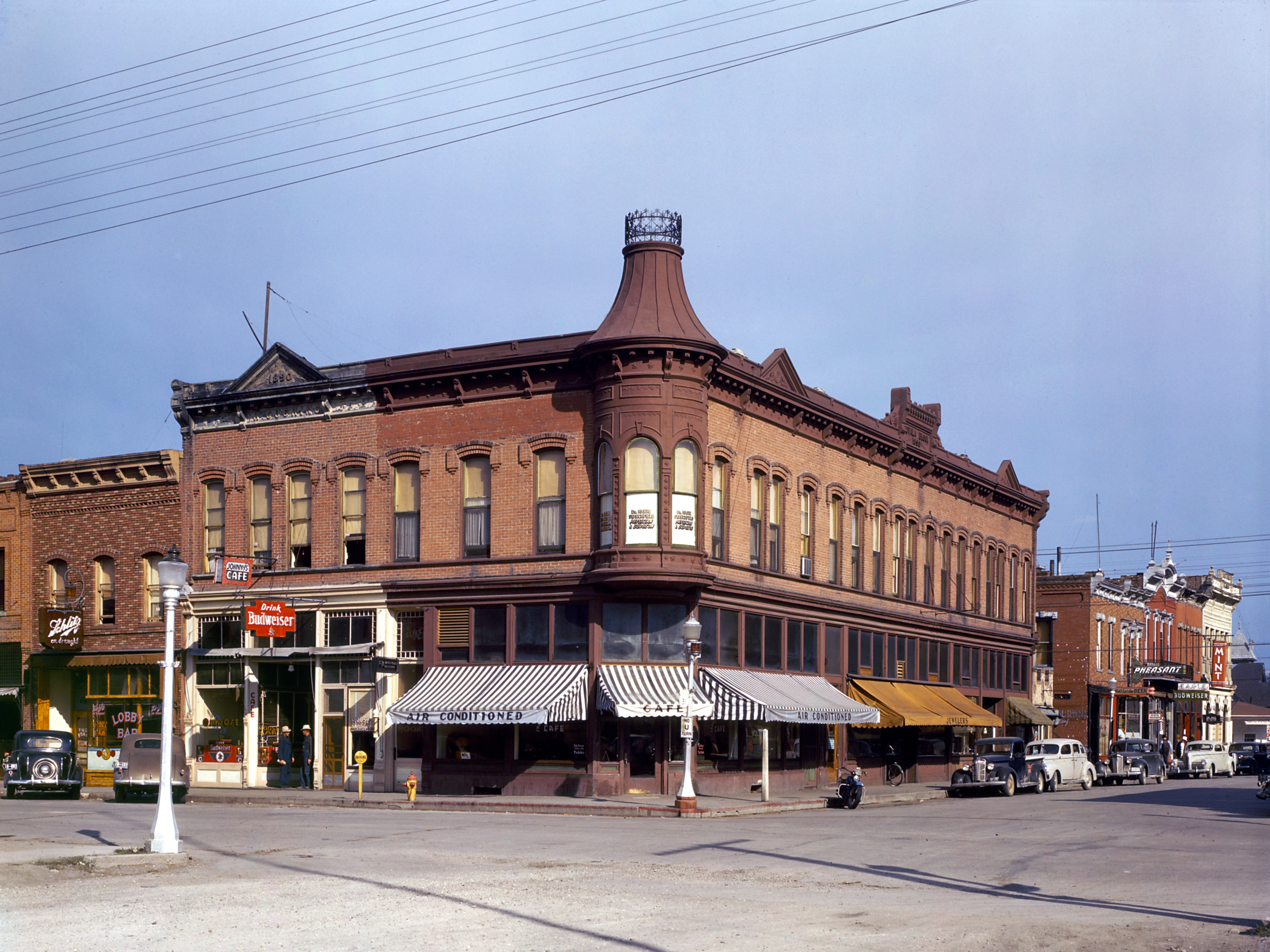
Southeast Corner of the intersection of Bannack and Montana Streets, in 1942. The photo was taken by Russell Lee, and the site today contains a much smaller structure.

Dillon was founded in the Beaverhead Valley as a railroad town in 1880. Originally named “Terminus” as it was temporarily the northernmost stop on the Utah and Northern Railway while it was under construction, in 1881, the community was renamed for Union Pacific Railroad President Sidney Dillon, who had directed the project of bringing the railroad through to Butte, Montana. The town's location was selected by the railroad in part because of its proximity to gold mines in the area.

The first ore discovered in the Dillon area was silver. Gold was first discovered at Grasshopper Creek in 1862, precipitating a flood of immigration to the area. The last real gold rush in the area occurred near Argenta in 1920 and lasted for 30 years.

Dillon served as a central location for transporting goods to nearby boomtowns such as Bannack, Argenta, Glen, and Virginia City. In 1881, Dillon became part of a contentious battle with Bannack to become the county seat of Beaverhead County. The first brick building in Dillon was built in 1882. In 1884, Dillon became an incorporated town and began building sidewalks and permanent dwellings for the residents.

While many of the gold mining towns around Dillon died, Dillon was able to thrive due to the railroad and talc mining in the area. A cattle industry was established in 1865. The agriculturally rich Beaverhead Valley became an ideal location for sheep ranching, introduced in 1869. Dillon was once the largest exporter of sheep wool in Montana.

The Montana Normal College was established as a teaching college in 1892, and is still functioning today, renowned for its Education program. A circus elephant named Old Pitt was struck by lightning in 1943 and is buried at the Dillon fairgrounds. Captain Joel Rude of the Montana National Guard crashed his F-106 into a grain elevator and died during a Labor Day Parade on September 3, 1979. A plaque in his honor is part of the Southwest Montana Veterans Memorial park in Dillon.

== Geography ==
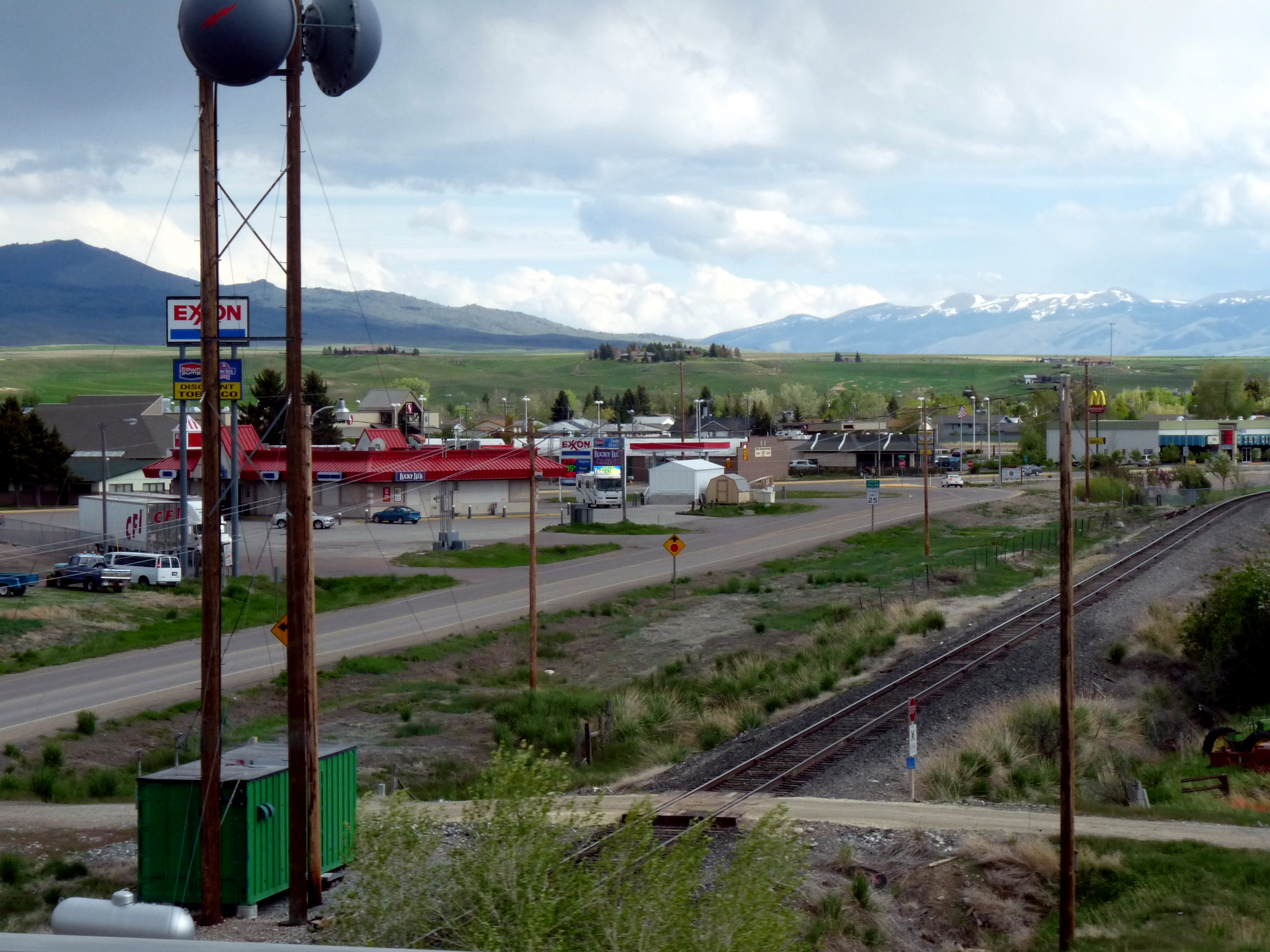
Dillon, from the Interstate 15 offramp, June 2010

Dillon is situated on the Beaverhead River. It lies at an elevation of 5,102 feet (1,555 m).

According to the United States Census Bureau, the city has a total area of 1.76 square miles (4.56 km^{2}), all land.

== Climate ==
Dillon experiences a semi-arid climate (Köppen BSk) with cold, dry winters and hot, wetter summers. On January 13, 2024, Dillon, Montana reached an all time record low of −42 °F (−41 °C).

Climate data for Dillon, Montana (University of Montana Western), 1991–2020 normals, extremes 1895–present
| Month | Jan | Feb | Mar | Apr | May | Jun | Jul | Aug | Sep | Oct | Nov | Dec | Year |
|---|---|---|---|---|---|---|---|---|---|---|---|---|---|
| Record high °F (°C) | 60 (16) | 65 (18) | 74 (23) | 84 (29) | 91 (33) | 98 (37) | 102 (39) | 100 (38) | 94 (34) | 86 (30) | 79 (26) | 65 (18) | 102 (39) |
| Mean maximum °F (°C) | 49.2 (9.6) | 52.4 (11.3) | 63.7 (17.6) | 73.0 (22.8) | 81.4 (27.4) | 88.5 (31.4) | 93.8 (34.3) | 92.0 (33.3) | 87.1 (30.6) | 75.8 (24.3) | 61.2 (16.2) | 48.5 (9.2) | 94.6 (34.8) |
| Mean daily maximum °F (°C) | 33.3 (0.7) | 36.7 (2.6) | 45.9 (7.7) | 54.3 (12.4) | 64.4 (18.0) | 72.8 (22.7) | 82.9 (28.3) | 80.9 (27.2) | 70.8 (21.6) | 56.4 (13.6) | 41.3 (5.2) | 31.6 (−0.2) | 55.9 (13.3) |
| Daily mean °F (°C) | 23.9 (−4.5) | 26.3 (−3.2) | 34.2 (1.2) | 41.3 (5.2) | 50.3 (10.2) | 57.5 (14.2) | 65.2 (18.4) | 63.2 (17.3) | 55.1 (12.8) | 43.3 (6.3) | 31.1 (−0.5) | 22.4 (−5.3) | 42.8 (6.0) |
| Mean daily minimum °F (°C) | 14.5 (−9.7) | 15.8 (−9.0) | 22.5 (−5.3) | 28.4 (−2.0) | 36.1 (2.3) | 42.2 (5.7) | 47.6 (8.7) | 45.5 (7.5) | 39.3 (4.1) | 30.3 (−0.9) | 21.0 (−6.1) | 13.2 (−10.4) | 29.7 (−1.3) |
| Mean minimum °F (°C) | −11.0 (−23.9) | −5.8 (−21.0) | 3.3 (−15.9) | 15.6 (−9.1) | 23.5 (−4.7) | 32.1 (0.1) | 38.9 (3.8) | 36.6 (2.6) | 26.4 (−3.1) | 12.1 (−11.1) | −2.0 (−18.9) | −8.7 (−22.6) | −18.9 (−28.3) |
| Record low °F (°C) | −42 (−41) | −40 (−40) | −26 (−32) | −3 (−19) | 15 (−9) | 23 (−5) | 30 (−1) | 25 (−4) | 9 (−13) | −13 (−25) | −31 (−35) | −37 (−38) | −42 (−41) |
| Average precipitation inches (mm) | 0.31 (7.9) | 0.35 (8.9) | 0.67 (17) | 1.51 (38) | 1.93 (49) | 1.92 (49) | 0.91 (23) | 0.86 (22) | 0.89 (23) | 0.95 (24) | 0.52 (13) | 0.45 (11) | 11.27 (285.8) |
| Average snowfall inches (cm) | 1.7 (4.3) | 0.9 (2.3) | 0.4 (1.0) | 0.2 (0.51) | 0.1 (0.25) | 0.0 (0.0) | 0.0 (0.0) | 0.0 (0.0) | 0.0 (0.0) | 0.4 (1.0) | 2.9 (7.4) | 4.6 (12) | 11.2 (28.76) |
| Average precipitation days (≥ 0.01 in) | 4.0 | 4.7 | 5.7 | 8.8 | 10.5 | 9.8 | 6.0 | 6.0 | 5.1 | 6.7 | 5.1 | 5.1 | 77.5 |
| Average snowy days (≥ 0.1 in) | 0.9 | 1.0 | 0.7 | 0.2 | 0.0 | 0.0 | 0.0 | 0.0 | 0.1 | 0.2 | 1.0 | 2.0 | 6.1 |
Source 1: NOAA
Source 2: National Weather Service

Climate data for Dillon, Montana (Dillon Airport), 1991–2020 normals, extremes 1940–present
| Month | Jan | Feb | Mar | Apr | May | Jun | Jul | Aug | Sep | Oct | Nov | Dec | Year |
|---|---|---|---|---|---|---|---|---|---|---|---|---|---|
| Record high °F (°C) | 58 (14) | 64 (18) | 79 (26) | 85 (29) | 90 (32) | 98 (37) | 102 (39) | 102 (39) | 97 (36) | 86 (30) | 71 (22) | 62 (17) | 102 (39) |
| Mean maximum °F (°C) | 48.0 (8.9) | 51.9 (11.1) | 62.8 (17.1) | 72.8 (22.7) | 81.0 (27.2) | 87.4 (30.8) | 94.0 (34.4) | 93.1 (33.9) | 88.0 (31.1) | 75.8 (24.3) | 61.4 (16.3) | 47.8 (8.8) | 95.0 (35.0) |
| Mean daily maximum °F (°C) | 31.7 (−0.2) | 35.2 (1.8) | 45.0 (7.2) | 52.6 (11.4) | 62.4 (16.9) | 70.8 (21.6) | 82.0 (27.8) | 80.6 (27.0) | 70.0 (21.1) | 55.3 (12.9) | 40.6 (4.8) | 30.6 (−0.8) | 54.7 (12.6) |
| Daily mean °F (°C) | 22.3 (−5.4) | 24.5 (−4.2) | 33.2 (0.7) | 40.1 (4.5) | 49.0 (9.4) | 56.6 (13.7) | 64.9 (18.3) | 63.4 (17.4) | 54.7 (12.6) | 42.2 (5.7) | 29.9 (−1.2) | 21.1 (−6.1) | 41.8 (5.5) |
| Mean daily minimum °F (°C) | 12.9 (−10.6) | 13.8 (−10.1) | 21.4 (−5.9) | 27.6 (−2.4) | 35.6 (2.0) | 42.3 (5.7) | 47.8 (8.8) | 46.2 (7.9) | 39.3 (4.1) | 29.1 (−1.6) | 19.1 (−7.2) | 11.5 (−11.4) | 28.9 (−1.7) |
| Mean minimum °F (°C) | −8.9 (−22.7) | −3.9 (−19.9) | 4.6 (−15.2) | 15.9 (−8.9) | 23.8 (−4.6) | 33.4 (0.8) | 40.3 (4.6) | 38.7 (3.7) | 28.0 (−2.2) | 12.2 (−11.0) | −2.0 (−18.9) | −9.6 (−23.1) | −17.6 (−27.6) |
| Record low °F (°C) | −41 (−41) | −43 (−42) | −23 (−31) | −5 (−21) | 14 (−10) | 25 (−4) | 32 (0) | 30 (−1) | 10 (−12) | −9 (−23) | −29 (−34) | −37 (−38) | −43 (−42) |
| Average precipitation inches (mm) | 0.20 (5.1) | 0.24 (6.1) | 0.52 (13) | 1.18 (30) | 1.76 (45) | 1.91 (49) | 0.89 (23) | 0.87 (22) | 0.91 (23) | 0.72 (18) | 0.37 (9.4) | 0.26 (6.6) | 9.83 (250.2) |
| Average precipitation days (≥ 0.01 in) | 3.2 | 4.7 | 6.5 | 9.0 | 11.0 | 10.6 | 6.4 | 6.5 | 6.0 | 5.9 | 5.3 | 4.7 | 79.8 |
Source 1: NOAA
Source 2: National Weather Service

== Demographics ==
Historical population
| Census | Pop. | Note | %± |
|---|---|---|---|
| 1890 | 1,012 | | — |
| 1900 | 1,530 | | 51.2% |
| 1910 | 1,835 | | 19.9% |
| 1920 | 2,701 | | 47.2% |
| 1930 | 2,422 | | −10.3% |
| 1940 | 3,014 | | 24.4% |
| 1950 | 3,268 | | 8.4% |
| 1960 | 3,690 | | 12.9% |
| 1970 | 4,548 | | 23.3% |
| 1980 | 3,976 | | −12.6% |
| 1990 | 3,991 | | 0.4% |
| 2000 | 3,752 | | −6.0% |
| 2010 | 4,134 | | 10.2% |
| 2020 | 3,880 | | −6.1% |
U.S. Decennial Census

=== 2020 census ===
As of the 2020 census, Dillon had a population of 3,880. The median age was 34.3 years. 19.5% of residents were under the age of 18 and 20.1% were 65 years of age or older. For every 100 females there were 97.2 males, and for every 100 females age 18 and over there were 92.3 males age 18 and over.

99.8% of residents lived in urban areas, while 0.2% lived in rural areas.

There were 1,735 households in Dillon, of which 21.8% had children under the age of 18 living in them. Of all households, 33.2% were married-couple households, 25.2% were households with a male householder and no spouse or partner present, and 33.2% were households with a female householder and no spouse or partner present. About 39.8% of all households were made up of individuals and 17.0% had someone living alone who was 65 years of age or older.

There were 1,947 housing units, of which 10.9% were vacant. The homeowner vacancy rate was 2.3% and the rental vacancy rate was 9.7%.

Racial composition as of the 2020 census
| Race | Number | Percent |
|---|---|---|
| White | 3,484 | 89.8% |
| Black or African American | 18 | 0.5% |
| American Indian and Alaska Native | 75 | 1.9% |
| Asian | 12 | 0.3% |
| Native Hawaiian and Other Pacific Islander | 3 | 0.1% |
| Some other race | 44 | 1.1% |
| Two or more races | 244 | 6.3% |
| Hispanic or Latino (of any race) | 174 | 4.5% |

=== 2010 census ===
As of the 2010 census, there were 4,134 people, 1,774 households, and 897 families living in the city. The population density was 2,348.9 inhabitants per square mile (906.9/km^{2}). There were 1,930 housing units at an average density of 1,096.6 per square mile (423.4/km^{2}). The racial makeup of the city was 94.7% White, 0.3% African American, 1.4% Native American, 0.5% Asian, 0.6% Pacific Islander, 0.6% from other races, and 1.9% from two or more races. Hispanic or Latino of any race were 3.5% of the population.

There were 1,774 households, of which 23.0% had children under the age of 18 living with them, 38.2% were married couples living together, 9.1% had a female householder with no husband present, 3.3% had a male householder with no wife present, and 49.4% were non-families. 40.1% of all households were made up of individuals, and 15.9% had someone living alone who was 65 years of age or older. The average household size was 2.08 and the average family size was 2.82.

The median age in the city was 33.9 years. 20% of residents were under the age of 18; 19.4% were between the ages of 18 and 24; 20.3% were from 25 to 44; 23.7% were from 45 to 64; and 16.7% were 65 years of age or older. The gender makeup of the city was 49.4% male and 50.6% female.

=== 2000 census ===
As of the 2000 census, there were 3,752 people, 1,669 households, and 934 families living in the city. The population density was 2,300.7 inhabitants per square mile (888.3/km^{2}). There were 1,831 housing units at an average density of 1,122.7 per square mile (433.7/km^{2}). The racial makeup of the city was 96.43% White, 0.35% African American, 1.31% Native American, 0.13% Asian, 0.61% from other races, and 1.17% from two or more races. Hispanic or Latino of any race were 1.95% of the population.

There were 1,669 households, out of which 27.6% had children under the age of 18 living with them, 44.3% were married couples living together, 8.3% had a female householder with no husband present, and 44.0% were non-families. 36.2% of all households were made up of individuals, and 14.9% had someone living alone who was 65 years of age or older. The average household size was 2.19 and the average family size was 2.88.

In the city, the population was spread out, with 22.7% under the age of 18, 11.1% from 18 to 24, 25.5% from 25 to 44, 22.4% from 45 to 64, and 18.3% who were 65 years of age or older. The median age was 39 years. For every 100 females there were 97.5 males. For every 100 females age 18 and over, there were 94.6 males.

The median income for a household in the city was $26,389, and the median income for a family was $39,643. Males had a median income of $25,625 versus $18,906 for females. The per capita income for the city was $16,432. About 13.8% of families and 18.2% of the population were below the poverty line, including 15.9% of those under age 18 and 15.9% of those age 65 or over.

== Economy ==
Dillon's largest employers include Barretts Minerals Inc., Barrett Hospital and HealthCare, and Beaverhead County. Great Harvest Bread Company has its franchising headquarters in Dillon.

== Arts and culture ==
The Beaverhead County Museum is in Dillon. Dillon Public Library was built as a Carnegie library in 1901 and still serves the community. The YMCA has a location within the city limits.

Recreational activities that draw tourism to Dillon include fishing on the Beaverhead River, snowmobiling, hiking, shopping at the Patagonia outlet, four-wheeling, the annual Demolition Derby, and skiing at Maverick Mountain Ski Area. Bannack State Park is popular with tourists. Dillon is also home to the annual "Montana's Biggest Weekend" event, also known as the Jaycee Labor Day Rodeo, Concert, & Parade.

== Government ==
Dillon has a mayor and eight city councilors. The council has four wards, each with two councilors. Incumbent mayor John McGinley was re-elected in November 2025, but had unexpectedly resigned on February 4, 2026 during a city council meeting. McGinley cited escalating personal attacks, seasonal depression, and other mental health issues behind his departure. On March 4, Dillon's city council unanimously appointed Michael Klakken as the new mayor on March 4. This was Klakken's second stint as mayor, having been McGinley's predecessor.

In the 2026 election, voters selected a change to the council-manager structure of government.

== Education ==
Dillon is part of School District 10 under Superintendent Glen A. Johnson. Schools in this district include: Parkview Elementary School, under Principal Greg Fitzgerald, and the Dillon Middle School under Principal Joel Rogers. Dillon is also home to Beaverhead County High School, a Class A High School under Principal Gary Haverfield. As of 2017, there were around 320 students. The high school's mascot is the Beaver.

Dillon is known statewide for its decades of success in high school sports. The boys' basketball team won the Class A State Championship in 1990, the school's first state title since 1946. Since 2000 the high school football team has played in 11 Class A State Championships, winning eight. The boys' basketball team has played in eight Class A State Championships since 2007, winning five.

The city is also home to the University of Montana Western, formerly Western Montana College, under provost and vice chancellor Deborah Hedeen and Chancellor Beth Weatherby. As of 2016, there were 1,501 students. The college mascot is the Bulldog.

== Media ==
KDBM AM 1490 and KBEV-FM 98.3, owned by the Dead-Air Broadcasting Company, are both licensed to serve the Dillon area. Two radio stations are operated by the University of Montana, KDWG FM 90.9 has a variety format and KUMW is public radio.

Television stations come from Butte and Denver:

- KXLF (Channel 4) CBS affiliate
- KDVR (Channel 5) Fox Affiliate
- KTVM (Channel 6) NBC affiliate
- KUSM (Channel 9) PBS affiliate

Dillon has two primary newspapers:

- The Dillonite Daily includes sections such as new job listings in and around the area, any and all things for sale, ISO, recent activity, and upcoming events.
- The Dillon Tribune presents sports, obituaries, community news, classifieds, weather and a local calendar.

== Infrastructure ==
Dillon Airport is a county-owned airport five miles northeast of Dillon.

== Notable people ==
- Troy Andersen, NFL linebacker
- Ed Barker, NFL wide receiver
- Everton Conger, American jurist and Civil War officer
- Frank W. Hazelbaker, politician, Speaker of the Montana House
- Lloyd Meeds, politician, lobbyist, and navy officer
- Edwin L. Norris, 5th Governor of Montana (1908–1913)
- Jacob Thorkelson, United States Representative from Montana
- Benjamin F. White, former mayor of Dillon and last Governor of Montana Territory (1889)

== See also ==
- List of municipalities in Montana
