= Bluebird Building =

- U.S. National Register of Historic Places
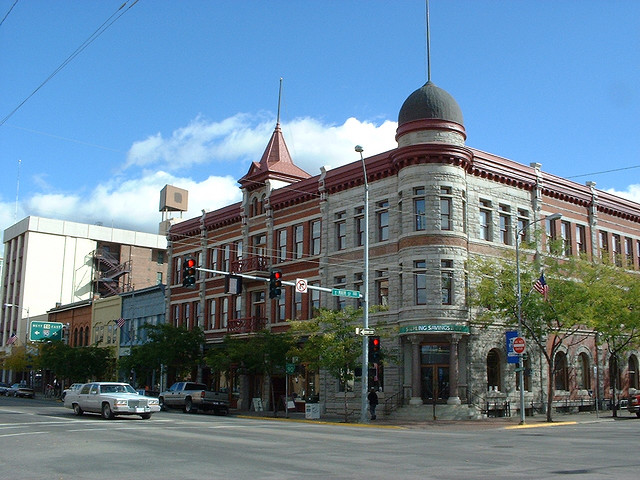

- Location within Montana
- Location: 220-224 N. Higgins Ave., Missoula, Montana
- Coordinates: 46°52′17″N 113°59′36″W
- Area: less than one acre
- Built: 1889, 1898, 1913, 1932
- Architectural style: Early Commercial
- MPS: Missoula MPS
- NRHP reference No.: 96000881
- Added to NRHP: August 8, 1996

The Bluebird Building, also known as the Higgins Block, at 220-224 N. Higgins Ave. in Missoula, Montana, was built in 1889 at cost of $125,000 and was modified later. It was listed on the National Register of Historic Places in 1996.

It included the Empress Theater.
