= Wildfires in 2025 =

List of major wildfires in the year 2025

- Date: January – December 2025

The 2025 wildfire season involved wildfires on multiple continents.

Below is a list of articles on wildfires from around the world in the year 2025.

== Africa ==
- 2025 Table Mountain fire

== Asia ==
- Ōfunato wildfire
- 2025 South Korea wildfires
- 2025 Israel–West Bank fires
- 2025 Syria wildfires
- 2025 Turkey wildfires
- 2025 Russian wildfires

== Europe ==
- 2025 European and Mediterranean wildfires
  - 2025 Albania wildfires
  - 2025 Bulgaria wildfires
  - 2025 Croatia wildfires
  - 2025 Cyprus wildfires
  - 2025 France wildfires
  - 2025 Germany wildfires
  - 2025 Greece wildfires
  - 2025 Montonegro wildfires
  - 2025 Netherlands wildfires
  - 2025 Portugal wildfires
  - 2025 Spain wildfires
  - 2025 Turkey wildfires
  - 2025 Limassol wildfires
  - 2025 United Kingdom wildfires
    - Dava wildfire
    - Langdale Moor wildfire

== North America ==
=== United States ===
- 2025 United States wildfires
  - 2025 Alaska wildfires
  - 2025 Arizona wildfires
    - Greer Fire
    - Dragon Bravo Fire
    - White Sage Fire
  - 2025 Arkansas wildfires
  - 2025 California wildfires
    - January 2025 Southern California wildfires
      - Palisades Fire
      - Eaton Fire
    - Madre Fire
    - Orleans Complex Fire
    - Gifford Fire
    - Canyon Fire
    - Pickett Fire
    - Little Fire
    - TCU September Lightning Complex
    - Pack Fire
  - 2025 Colorado wildfires
    - South Rim Fire
    - Lee Fire
    - Elk Fire
  - 2025 Florida wildfires
    - Mile Marker 39 Fire
  - Jones Road Fire
  - 2025 Idaho wildfires
  - 2025 Kansas wildfires
  - 2025 Minnesota wildfires
    - Camp House Fire
  - 2025 Mississippi wildfires
  - 2025 Missouri wildfires
  - 2025 Nebraska wildfires
  - 2025 Nevada wildfires
  - 2025 New Mexico wildfires
  - 2025 North Carolina wildfires
  - 2025 North Dakota wildfires
  - 2025 Oklahoma wildfires
  - 2025 Oregon wildfires
    - Rowena Fire
    - Cram Fire
    - Flat Fire
  - 2025 South Carolina wildfires
  - 2025 South Dakota wildfires
  - 2025 Tennessee wildfires
  - 2025 Texas wildfires
    - Crabapple Fire
  - 2025 Utah wildfires
    - Forsyth Fire
    - Deer Creek Fire
    - Monroe Canyon Fire
  - 2025 Washington wildfires
    - Bear Gulch Fire
    - Burdoin Fire
  - 2025 Wyoming wildfires

=== Canada ===
- 2025 Canadian wildfires

== South America ==
- 2025 South American wildfires

== See also ==
- Weather of 2025
