= 2025 Missouri wildfires =

Series of wildfires

Statistics
- Total fires: >2,700
- Total area: >110,000 acres (45,000 ha; 170 sq mi)

In 2025, a series of wildfires burned in the U.S. state of Missouri.

== Background ==
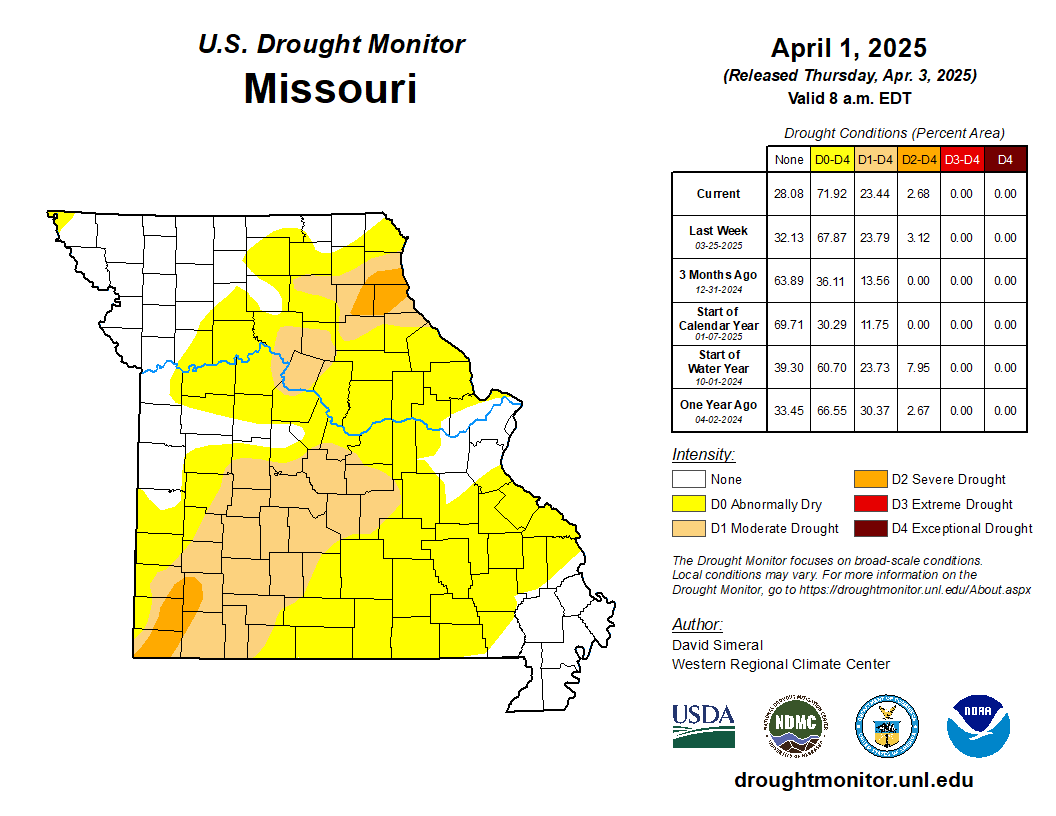
Missouri Drought Monitor at its peak on April 1, 2025

Historically, Missouri experiences two primary periods of heightened wildfire activity. The late winter–early spring fire season typically occurs from late February through mid-April, when dormant vegetation, low humidity, and strong winds create conditions for rapid fire spread. This season often tapers off with the arrival of spring rains and new plant growth, which increase moisture levels and reduce flammability.

The late summer–early fall fire season generally runs from late August into early October, when extended dry spells, high temperatures, and declining soil moisture make grasses and brush more susceptible to ignition. Agricultural field clearing and open burning during this period can also contribute to wildfire starts.

Wildfires in Missouri can occur at any time of year, particularly during droughts or high-wind events. While Missouri does not have a statewide burn-permit season, local governments and fire protection districts may impose temporary burn bans when fire danger is elevated. State agencies encourage residents to follow Missouri Outdoor Burning Safety Guidelines year-round to reduce the risk of accidental ignition.

== Summary ==
Missouri saw an unusually active early wildfire season in 2025. In mid-March, dry conditions and strong winds fueled a rash of brush and grass fires statewide. Between March 10 and 16, more than 224 wildfires burned over 15,500 acres, leading to property damage and heavy demands on suppression resources.

On March 14, a strong wind event associated with a deep low-pressure system produced gusts up to 60 mph, exacerbating fire spread across southern and central Missouri as vegetation was already dry.

Many of the fires included human-caused ignitions, escaped debris burns, or accidental spread from open burning, along with some natural ignitions.

Smoke from these early fires degraded air quality in nearby counties, especially under inversion conditions or weak winds, though impacts were mostly local and intermittent. Fire suppression was challenged by limited resources, rural terrain, scattered ignitions, and rapid fire spread under critical weather conditions.

== List of wildfires ==
The following is a list of fires that burned more than 1,000 acres (400 ha), produced significant structural damage, or resulted in casualties.

Name	County	Acres	Start date	Containment date (Note: Containment means that fire crews have established and secured control lines around the fire's perimeter. These lines are artificial barriers, like trenches or cleared vegetation, designed to stop the fire's spread, or natural barriers like rivers. Containment reflects progress in managing the fire but does not necessarily mean the fire is starved of fuel, under control, or put out.)	Notes	Ref.
Buttram	Taney	2,258	January 28	February 11		
Cotham Fires	Ripley	1,084	March 2	March 13	Burned in Mark Twain National Forest and Sinkin Experimental Forest.	
Basin	Taney	3,185	March 3	March 11		
Knotwell	Phelps	1,063	March 8	March 12	Burned in Mark Twain National Forest.	
Eldridge	Taney	5031.4	March 12	March 22		
Simpson Mtn	Douglas	1,063	March 19	March 22		
Bridges Hollow	Texas	1,621	March 25	April 4	Burned in Mark Twain National Forest.	

Perimeters of wildfires in Missouri during 2025 (Red: >1000 acres) (map data)

== See also ==
- 2025 United States wildfires
