= 2025 United States wildfires =

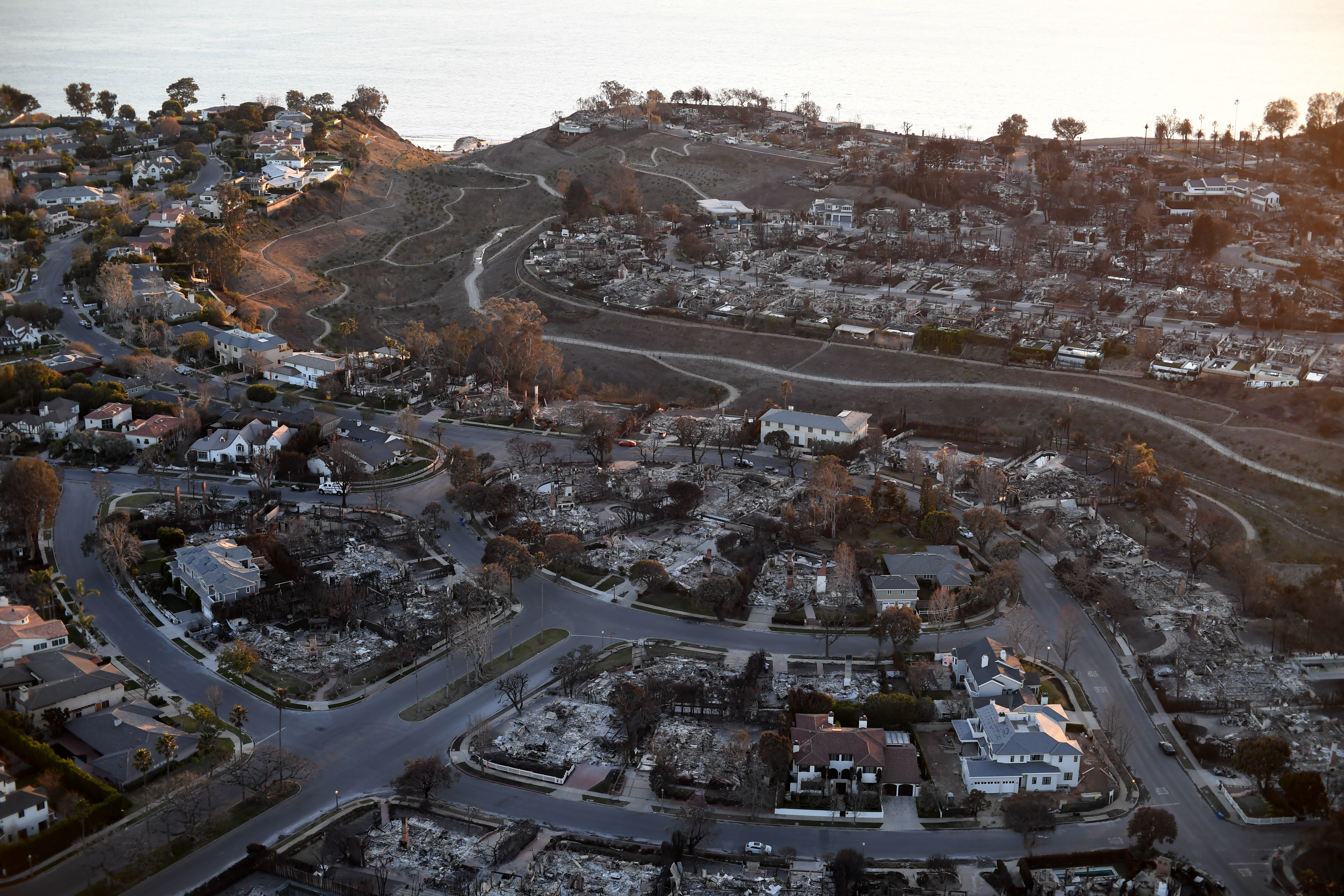
- Homes destroyed in the Palisades Fire.
- Date: January 7, 2025 – December 22, 2025

Statistics
- Total fires: 72,068
- Total area: 5,039,145 acres (2,039,270 ha)

Impacts
- Deaths: 31

This page documents wildfires across the United States during 2025, that have burned more than 1,000 acres (400 hectares), produced significant structural damage or casualties, or otherwise been notable. Acreage and containment figures may not be up to date.

== Background ==
=== Season background ===
While most wildfires in the United States occur from May to November, wildfires can occur during any time of the year. Peak fire season is normally in August, when it is the hottest and driest. Wildfires outside of the fire season are becoming more common from climate change and changing weather patterns. Rising temperatures are leading to earlier snowmelt and later fall and winter precipitation. Drought and hot, dry weather events are becoming more common. Forests pests, such as bark beetles, and invasive species, such as cheatgrass, kill trees and make forests more vulnerable. Areas with dense vegetation or tree cover provide ample fire fuel.

Wildfire season is expected to worsen from climate change. Warmer, drier conditions are expected to increase fire severity in California and the Southwest.

=== Seasonal forecasts ===
The Significant Wildland Fire Potential Outlook, month-by-month data from 2025.

In March 2025, the Climate Prediction Center (CPC), a branch of NOAA, issued its National Seasonal Fire Outlook. This forecast projected above-normal wildfire risk for much of California, Oregon, Washington, Nevada, and the southwestern United States. The elevated risk was linked primarily to persistent atmospheric patterns resembling La Niña, which typically reduce precipitation and increase temperatures in these regions. The outlook considered factors such as expected temperature and precipitation anomalies, soil moisture, and vegetation dryness to predict fire activity for the upcoming season.

=== Climatic conditions ===
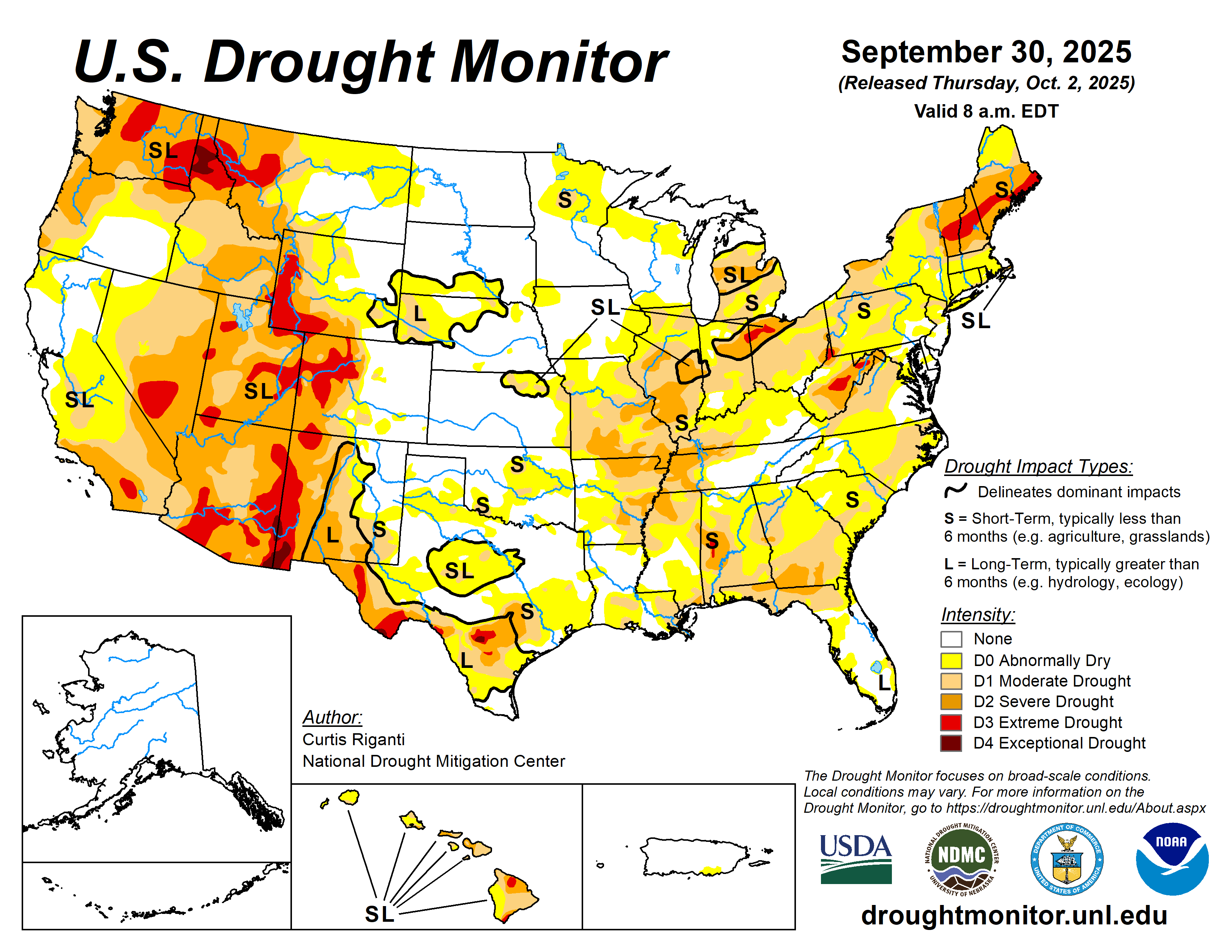
United States drought at the start of water year.

During spring and early summer 2025, observed temperature anomalies across the western U.S. averaged approximately +1.5°C above the 30-year climatological norm. These warmer-than-average conditions contributed to earlier snowmelt and accelerated drying of live and dead vegetation, factors known to increase wildfire potential. These temperature trends aligned with the CPC's seasonal forecast and contributed to extending the typical wildfire season window.

By mid-2025, the U.S. Drought Monitor reported that nearly 45% of the western United States was under severe to exceptional drought conditions, with California and Nevada among the hardest-hit states. These drought conditions stressed vegetation and depleted soil moisture, significantly reducing fuel moisture content and thereby increasing wildfire risk and severity across large areas.

Throughout the season, live fuel moisture levels dropped below 70%, and dead fuel moisture fell below 5% in many fire-prone ecosystems. These critically low moisture levels meant vegetation was highly flammable, facilitating rapid wildfire ignition and spread. Fire Danger Ratings issued by the National Interagency Fire Center (NIFC) frequently reached "High" to "Extreme" during peak fire months, driven by hot, dry winds and low relative humidity. Enhancements in fire monitoring technology were seen in 2025 with the operational deployment of the GOES-T satellite system, which provided real-time thermal imagery to aid in wildfire detection and management.

== Seasonal summary ==
The wildfire season commenced early with numerous ignitions in May 2025. Favorable fire weather conditions facilitated rapid expansion of multiple fires, with several surpassing 10,000 acres by early summer. Notable fire activity was recorded in California's Sierra Nevada foothills and Oregon's Cascade Range, where rugged terrain and dry fuels compounded fire growth and suppression challenges.

Firefighting efforts in 2025 required record mobilization of personnel and resources. Incident management teams, ground crews, and aerial firefighting assets were extensively deployed to manage numerous large and complex fires. However, prescribed burning and mechanical fuel reduction strategies faced limitations due to narrow windows of safe weather conditions and ongoing drought, constraining mitigation options during the critical peak season.

2025 United States wildfires by month
	Jan	Feb	Mar	Apr	May	Jun	Jul	Aug	Sep	Oct	Nov	Dec	Total
Number of Fires	2,128	3,117	10,835	6,679	4,974	6,213	6,708	5,996	6,144	4,458	4,275	10,541	72,068
Acres Burned	64,038	44,497	691,723	188,061	157,911	643,352	1,442,886	897,098	531,118	204,673	62,547	111,241	5,039,145

== List ==
Name	State	County	Acres	Start date	Containment date (Note: Containment means that fire crews have established and secured control lines around the fire's perimeter. These lines are artificial barriers, like trenches or cleared vegetation, designed to stop the fire's spread, or natural barriers like rivers. Containment reflects progress in managing the fire but does not necessarily mean the fire is starved of fuel, under control, or put out.)	Notes	References
Gap	Arizona	Graham	1,439	January 7	January 10	2025 Arizona wildfires	
Palisades	California	Los Angeles	23,448	January 7	January 31	2025 California wildfires – Evacuations forced; destroyed at least 6,837 structures and damaged 966 in Pacific Palisades and Malibu, northwest of Santa Monica; twelve confirmed fatalities and four confirmed injuries; third-most destructive wildfire in California history; associated with extremely powerful Santa Ana wind event.	
Eaton	California	Los Angeles	14,021	January 7	January 31	2025 California wildfires – Evacuations forced; destroyed 9,418 structures and damaged 1,073 in Altadena and Pasadena, making it the second-most destructive fire in California history; seventeen confirmed fatalities and nine confirmed injuries, making it the fifth deadliest in state history; associated with extremely powerful Santa Ana wind event.	
Kenneth	California	Los Angeles, Ventura	1,052	January 9	January 12	2025 California wildfires – Evacuations forced. Associated with extremely powerful Santa Ana wind event.	
Hughes	California	Los Angeles	10,425	January 22	January 30	2025 California wildfires – Burned near Castaic Lake. Evacuations forced; associated with extremely powerful Santa Ana wind event that begun on January 22.	
Border 2	California	San Diego	6,625	January 23	January 30	2025 California wildfires – Burnt in the Otay Mountain Wilderness.	
Buttram	Missouri	Taney	2,258	January 28	February 11	2025 Missouri wildfires	
Fixed Wing	Mississippi	Perry	1,276	January 30	January 30	2025 Mississippi wildfires – Burned on Camp Shelby.	
Blue Hills	Texas	Hutchinson, Moore	3,900	February 1	February 4	2025 Texas wildfires – Caused evacuations for residents of Bugbee. Caused by open burning.	
Cottonwood Canyon	New Mexico	Lincoln	2,011	February 8	February 14	2025 New Mexico wildfires – Caused by human activity. The fire resulted in approximately $450,000 in damage.	
Middleton	Texas	Chambers	3,089	February 16	February 18	2025 Texas wildfires – Burned in tall grass 2 miles north of High Island.	
Eureka Valley	Nebraska	Custer	4,800	February 25	March 4	2025 Nebraska wildfires – Caused by human activity.	
Dismal River Ranch	Nebraska	McPherson, Hooker	15,800	February 25	February 28	2025 Nebraska wildfires	
Two Barrel	Florida	Liberty	1,944	February 26	March 17	2025 Florida wildfires – The fire caused approximately $290,000 in damage.	
Mason Mountain	Oklahoma	Pushmataha	1,871	February 28	March 4	2025 Oklahoma wildfires – Human-caused.	
Turkey Hammock	Florida	Brevard	1,171	February 28	March 22	2025 Florida wildfires – Human-caused.	
River Ranch	Oklahoma	Hughes	1,100	March 1	March 4	2025 Oklahoma wildfires	
Saddle Gap	Oklahoma	Latimer	12,327	March 1	March 12	2025 Oklahoma wildfires – Caused by human activity.	
Patterson	Mississippi	Perry	1,480	March 1	March 1	2025 Mississippi wildfires – Burned on Camp Shelby.	
Red Oak Peak	Oklahoma	Latimer	1,267	March 1	March 5	2025 Oklahoma wildfires	
Low Water	Oklahoma	Pittsburg	1,984	March 1	March 5	2025 Oklahoma wildfires – Caused by human activity.	
Doiser	Kansas	Grant	1,651	March 1	March 4	2025 Kansas wildfires – Caused by human activity.	
Covington Drive Compact	South Carolina	Horry	2,059	March 2	May 22		
Shoot House	Mississippi	Perry	6,082	March 2	March 2	2025 Mississippi wildfires – Burned in Camp Shelby Joint Forces Training Center. Caused around $18,000 in damage.	
Rough Rock	Oklahoma	McIntosh	1,005	March 2	March 4	2025 Oklahoma wildfires	
Basin	Missouri	Taney	3,185	March 3	March 11	2025 Missouri wildfires	
BOX-R (19-T5) 0161	Florida	Franklin	1,200	March 3	March 19	2025 Florida wildfires – Caused by human activity.	
Robins	Maryland	Dorchester	1,200	March 3	March 12		
Bluitt Plant 2	New Mexico	Roosevelt	5,583	March 3	March 4	2025 New Mexico wildfires	
Twin Oryx	Texas	La Salle	2,156	March 4	March 6	2025 Texas wildfires	
Welder Complex	Texas	San Patricio	775	March 4	March 8	2025 Texas wildfires – Damaged multiple structures and caused four injuries.	
Sevier - East Parkway	Tennessee	Sevier	1,087	March 4	March 14	2025 Tennessee wildfires	
Paur	North Dakota	Grand Forks	1,816	March 6	March 6	2025 North Dakota wildfires	
Long Island Wildfires	New York	Suffolk	600	March 8	March 10	Damaged 2 commercial buildings. Caused one injury. Governor of New York declared a state of emergency due to wildfires.	
Route 13	South Dakota	Ziebach	33,928	March 10	March 20	2025 South Dakota wildfires – Burned within the Cheyenne River Indian Reservation. Evacuated the community and school of Takini.	
Unknown	Nebraska	Wheeler	8,000	March 10	March 11	2025 Nebraska wildfires	
Acorn	Oklahoma	Osage	3,070	March 10	March 17	2025 Oklahoma wildfires	
Andrix	Colorado	Baca	1,934	March 10	March 10	2025 Colorado wildfires – Caused by human activity.	
Highway 49	North Dakota	Grant	3,960	March 11	March 11	2025 North Dakota wildfires	
Nadel	Oklahoma	Osage	2,398	March 11	March 17	2025 Oklahoma wildfires	
The 344	Florida	Miami-Dade	26,719	March 12	April 4	2025 Florida wildfires – Caused by human activity.	
Bear	Oklahoma	Osage	2,345	March 12	March 20	2025 Oklahoma wildfires	
Blue Stem	Mississippi	Franklin	2,031	March 13	March 13	2025 Mississippi wildfires – Caused by human activity.	
Meridian	Colorado	El Paso	2,540		March 16	2025 Colorado wildfires – Caused evacuations for areas of Schriever Space Force Base.	
South Tripp	South Dakota	Tripp	1,288	March 14	March 15	2025 South Dakota wildfires – Caused by human activity.	
Windmill	Texas	Ochiltree, Lipscomb, Roberts	23,287	March 14	March 20	2025 Texas wildfires – Closed Highway 70. Evacuated some areas south of Booker.	
840 Road	Oklahoma	Custer, Roger Mills, Dewey	27,866	March 14	March 25	2025 Oklahoma wildfires – Evacuated residents of Leedey. Destroyed 1 residence.	
Rest Area	Texas	Gray, Donley	7,931	March 14	March 16	2025 Texas wildfires – Jumped Interstate 40. Evacuated residents of Alanreed and McLean.	
Tango	Oklahoma	Osage	2,731	March 14	April 3	2025 Oklahoma wildfires	
Wildhorse	Oklahoma	Stephens	4,500	March 14	March 18	2025 Oklahoma wildfires – Evacuated Velma.	
Euchee Valley/Underwood	Oklahoma	Payne	8,512	March 14	March 26	2025 Oklahoma wildfires – Destroyed 9 structures.	
Hickory Hill/Luther	Oklahoma	Logan, Oklahoma	6,643	March 14	March 24	2025 Oklahoma wildfires – Evacuated Coyle and Langston. Destroyed 13 structures.	
Mogote Hill	New Mexico	Mora, San Miguel	21,433	March 14	April 7	2025 New Mexico wildfires – Caused by human activity.	
Camargo	Oklahoma	Dewey	6,075	March 14	March 23	2025 Oklahoma wildfires – Evacuated Camargo. Destroyed 2 structures.	
33 Road	Oklahoma	Logan	31,232	March 14	March 30	2025 Oklahoma wildfires – Destroyed 160 structures.	
Big Eagle	Oklahoma	Osage	10,230	March 14	March 24	2025 Oklahoma wildfires – Destroyed 19 structures.	
Little Salt Creek	Oklahoma	Creek	11,192	March 14	March 26	2025 Oklahoma wildfires – Destroyed 29 structures.	
Cedar Hill	Oklahoma	Osage	1,560	March 14	March 20	2025 Oklahoma wildfires – Destroyed 3 structures.	
Hellroaring Creek	Oklahoma	Pawnee	10,900	March 14	March 18	2025 Oklahoma wildfires – Destroyed 3 structures.	
Oak Street	Oklahoma	Osage, Pawnee	9,045	March 14	March 28	2025 Oklahoma wildfires	
1980 Road	Oklahoma	Roger Mills	1,700	March 14	March 18	2025 Oklahoma wildfires	
Stillwater	Oklahoma	Payne	7,639	March 14	March 26	2025 Oklahoma wildfires – Destroyed at least 202 homes in Stillwater. 12 were in the emergency room for "smoke inhalation or patients on home care who needed to evacuate."	
Lake Wabaunsee	Kansas	Wabaunsee	1,200	March 14	March 20	2025 Kansas wildfires – Human-caused.	
Coon Creek	Kansas	Chautauqua	8,704	March 14	March 23	2025 Kansas wildfires	
170 Rd V5	Kansas	Lyon	1,100	March 14	March 14	2025 Kansas wildfires	
212 Road	Kansas	Cowley	1,500	March 14	March 14	2025 Kansas wildfires – Human-caused.	
South Big Creek	Kansas	Woodson	1,450	March 14	March 14	2025 Kansas wildfires – Human-caused.	
Y5	Kansas	Lyon	1,500	March 14	March 18	2025 Kansas wildfires – Human-caused.	
Crabapple	Texas	Gillespie	9,858	March 15	March 21	2025 Texas wildfires – Caused by debris. Destroyed 9 structures.	
Persimmon	Texas	Jefferson	1,691	March 16	March 19	2025 Texas wildfires	
East Stich	Oklahoma	Osage	1,660	March 16	March 20	2025 Oklahoma wildfires	
Mediator	California	Imperial	1,100	March 17	March 18	2025 California wildfires	
Blackburn	Arkansas	Crawford	1,169	March 17	March 21	2025 Arkansas wildfires – Caused by lightning.	
Tiger Mount	Oklahoma	McIntosh	1,630	March 17	March 23	2025 Oklahoma wildfires – Human-caused. Destroyed 3 structures.	
Iron Ladies	Colorado	Weld	1,501	March 17	March 18	2025 Colorado wildfires	
Rugged Mtn	Oklahoma	Pittsburg	1,463	March 17	March 22	2025 Oklahoma wildfires – Human-caused.	
Neal Creek	Arkansas	Pulaski	1,910	March 17	March 18	2025 Arkansas wildfires – Caused evacuations.	
Plan B	Oklahoma	Latimer	3,231	March 18	March 25	2025 Oklahoma wildfires – Human-caused.	
Flying J	Oklahoma	Latimer	1,154	March 18	March 19	2025 Oklahoma wildfires – Human-caused.	
Boggs Hollow	Oklahoma	Latimer	1,102	March 18	March 31	2025 Oklahoma wildfires – Human-caused.	
High Lonesome	Oklahoma, Texas	Cimarron (OK), Dallam (TX)	23,335	March 18	March 19	2025 Oklahoma wildfires, 2025 Texas wildfires	
31 North & South	Colorado	Otero	4,389	March 18	March 18	2025 Colorado wildfires	
Johnson	Florida	Miami-Dade	8,340	March 18	May 13	2025 Florida wildfires	
Turner Road	Mississippi	Greene	2,281	March 18	March 23	2025 Mississippi wildfires	
Black Cove	North Carolina	Polk	3,502	March 19	April 10	2025 North Carolina wildfires	
Deep Woods	North Carolina	Polk	3,969	March 19	April 10	2025 North Carolina wildfires – 2 residences reported to be destroyed.	
Pauline Road	Texas	San Jacinto, Montgomery	2,421	March 19	March 26	2025 Texas wildfires	
Simpson Mtn	Missouri	Douglas	1,063	March 19	March 22	2025 Missouri wildfires	
Big Glow	Tennessee	Greene	2,875	March 20	March 24	2025 Tennessee wildfires	
Pale Rock	Oklahoma	Osage	1,100	March 21	March 24	2025 Oklahoma wildfires	
Flat Rock	Mississippi	Benton	1,145	March 22	March 23	2025 Mississippi wildfires	
Boar Creek	Oklahoma	Osage	2,030	March 22	April 1	2025 Oklahoma wildfires	
California Branch	New Jersey	Burlington	2,336	March 22	March 24	Evacuated campgrounds in Wharton State Forest.	
Table Rock Complex	South Carolina	Greenville, Pickens	15,973	March 22	April 7	The Table Rock Fire is 13,210 acres, and the Persimmon Ridge Fire is 2,128 acres.	
Big Ridge	Georgia	Rabun	3,434	March 22	April 11		
Rock Springs	Kentucky	Whitley	1,005	March 22	March 24		
Rocktown	Oklahoma	Pushmataha	1,711	March 23	March 26	2025 Oklahoma wildfires	
Red Hill	Oklahoma	McIntosh	1,673	March 24	March 28	2025 Oklahoma wildfires	
Salt Creek	Oklahoma	Sequoyah	1,657	March 24	March 29	2025 Oklahoma wildfires	
Bridges Hollow	Missouri	Texas	1,621	March 25	April 4	2025 Missouri wildfires – Burned in Mark Twain National Forest.	
Walnut	Oklahoma	Okfuskee	1,558	March 25	March 28	2025 Oklahoma wildfires	
Alarka #5	North Carolina	Swain	1,575	March 25	April 8	2025 North Carolina wildfires	
South Tiger	Oklahoma	McIntosh	1,909	March 26	March 28	2025 Oklahoma wildfires	
Rattlesnake Branch	North Carolina	Haywood	1,858	March 26	April 25	2025 North Carolina wildfires	
N Maxwell Road	Nebraska	Lincoln	8,800	March 26	March 28	2025 Nebraska wildfires	
Happy Hill Road	Oklahoma	Pittsburg	1,152	March 27	March 30	2025 Oklahoma wildfires	
Spider	Arizona	Navajo	1,702	March 27	March 31	2025 Arizona wildfires	
32nd	North Dakota	McKenzie	2,250	March 27	March 27	2025 North Dakota wildfires	
Dads Lake	Nebraska	Cherry	18,552	March 28	March 29	2025 Nebraska wildfires	
Silver	California	Inyo	1,611	March 30	April 6	2025 California wildfires – Evacuation orders were issued for parts of Inyo and Mono counties.	
East Marsh	Florida	Volusia	3,377	March 31	April 7	2025 Florida wildfires	
North River Road	Kansas	Kearny	5,030	April 1	April 2	2025 Kansas wildfires	
US 160	Colorado	Las Animas	2,270	April 7	April 7	2025 Colorado wildfires	
Cedar River	North Dakota	Sioux, Grant, Adams	8,960	April 9	April 13	2025 North Dakota wildfires	
Dugdale	Minnesota	Polk	3,744	April 9	April 11	2025 Minnesota wildfires	
Hwy 14	North Dakota	Sheridan	4,100	April 12	April 12	2025 North Dakota wildfires – Injured two firefighters.	
Haoe Lead	North Carolina	Graham	3,103	April 12	May 5	2025 North Carolina wildfires	
Potato Hill	North Dakota	Emmons	1,302	April 12	April 12	2025 North Dakota wildfires	
Juniper Swamp	Florida	Liberty	4,986	April 12	May 8	2025 Florida wildfires	
Last Chance	Oklahoma	Delaware	1,200	April 14	April 30	2025 Oklahoma wildfires	
Hilliardville	Florida	Wakulla	1,291	April 15	April 20	2025 Florida wildfires	
Bee Rock Creek	North Carolina	McDowell	2,085	April 15	April 24	2025 North Carolina wildfires	
Partridge Two	Minnesota	Morrison	2,300	April 17	April 25	2025 Minnesota wildfires	
Danny's	New Jersey	Cumberland	1,327	April 18	May 12		
Curry Island	Florida	Glades	1,050	April 18	May 1	2025 Florida wildfires	
Plum Creek	Nebraska	Brown	7,075	April 21	April 30	2025 Nebraska wildfires – Started as a prescribed burn but escaped due to high winds.	
Jones Road	New Jersey	Ocean	15,300	April 22	May 12	5,000 residents were evacuated and over 1,300 structures were threatened.	
Thompson Hollow Road	Pennsylvania	Cumberland	2,248	April 23	May 5		
Stronghold	Arizona	Cochise	2,138	April 28	May 7	2025 Arizona wildfires	
Buckhorn Archery	North Dakota	Rolette	1,308	April 30	May 14	2025 North Dakota wildfires	
Sawlog	Montana	Beaverhead	2,030	May 1	May 13	2025 Montana wildfires	
Sunset Road	North Carolina	Brunswick	1,331	May 2	June 2	2025 North Carolina wildfires	
Backburn	North Dakota	Rolette	1,342	May 3	May 15	2025 North Dakota wildfires	
Blind	Arizona	Coconino	6,329	May 4	May 25	2025 Arizona wildfires	
Unknown	North Dakota	Mountrail	1,600	May 4	May 5	2025 North Dakota wildfires	
Pouch Point	North Dakota	Mountrail	2,000	May 4	May 14	2025 North Dakota wildfires	
Springs	California	Kern, Tulare	1,817	May 6	May 7	2025 California wildfires	
Bryce	Arizona	Graham	3,294	May 7	May 20	2025 Arizona wildfires	
Coyote	Arizona	Apache	1,280	May 11	May 15	2025 Arizona wildfires	
Camp House	Minnesota	Lake, St. Louis	12,071	May 11	June 9	2025 Minnesota wildfires	
Jenkins Creek	Minnesota	St. Louis	16,145	May 12	June 21	2025 Minnesota wildfires	
Munger Shaw	Minnesota	St. Louis	1,259	May 12	May 13	2025 Minnesota wildfires	
Greer	Arizona	Apache	20,308	May 13	May 26	2025 Arizona wildfires	
Jaw	California	Kern	4,327	May 19	June 1	2025 California wildfires	
Cody	Arizona	Pinal	1,223	May 21	June 4	2025 Arizona wildfires	
Sandy	Florida	Monroe	6,656	May 24	June 5	2025 Florida wildfires	
Wood	Florida	Highlands	1,272	May 25	May 31	2025 Florida wildfires	
Kathul	Alaska	Southeast Fairbanks	1,008	May 25	June 11	2025 Alaska wildfires	
Butte Creek	Oregon	Wheeler, Gilliam	1,776	May 25	May 30	2025 Oregon wildfires	
Twin Butte	Idaho	Owyhee	2,600	May 28	May 29	2025 Idaho wildfires	
Ashlock	Idaho	Payette	1,289	May 29	May 29	2025 Idaho wildfires	
Dunes	Idaho	Washington	1,060	June 3	June 4	2025 Idaho wildfires	
Ranch	Arizona	Santa Cruz	2,751	June 4	June 11	2025 Arizona wildfires	
Hag	Utah	Box Elder	9,500	June 5	June 7	2025 Utah wildfires	
Basin	Arizona	Coconino	9,145	June 5	June 25	2025 Arizona wildfires	
Ollie Roberts Road	Florida	Hardee	1,350	June 5	June 12	2025 Florida wildfires	
Firewater	Washington	Yakima	3,820	June 8	June 9	2025 Washington wildfires	
Ranch	California	San Bernardino	4,293	June 10	June 19	2025 California wildfires – Evacuations for areas of Apple Valley and State Route 18.	
Rowena	Oregon	Wasco	3,700	June 11	June 25	2025 Oregon wildfires – Destroyed 49 homes and evacuated over 730 residents. Burned along the Columbia River.	
Burnt Canyon	Nevada	Lincoln	1,068	June 11	June 19	2025 Nevada wildfires – Caused by lightning.	
Ferry	Oregon	Sherman	10,458	June 11	June 19	2025 Oregon wildfires – Burnt into Cottonwood Canyon State Park, closing OR 206. Prompted evacuations.	
France Canyon	Utah	Kane, Garfield	34,943	June 11	July 23	2025 Utah wildfires – Caused by lightning.	
Vansycle Canyon	Washington	Walla Walla	2,026	June 12	June 14	2025 Washington wildfires – Prompted evacuations.	
Buck	New Mexico	Catron	57,753	June 12	July 4	2025 New Mexico wildfires - Started from a lightning strike on BLM lands. Threatening structures on private ranches.	
Trout	New Mexico	Grant	47,294	June 12	July 19	2025 New Mexico wildfires - Prompted evacuations for the Lake Roberts area.	
Dogs	California	Kern	4,407	June 13	June 15	2025 California wildfires – Burned north of Bakersfield, forcing evacuations. Additional evacuation warnings were issued for a small area of northeastern Bakersfield.	
Mines Spung	New Jersey	Burlington	6,400	June 13	June 20		
Horse	Wyoming	Sublette	2,802	June 13	July 24	2025 Wyoming wildfires – Caused by lightning.	
Pomas	Washington	Chelan	3,618	June 13	December 15	2025 Washington wildfires	
Bridge Creek	Utah	San Juan	2,588	June 13	July 21	2025 Utah wildfires – Caused by lightning.	
Bitter	California	San Luis Obispo	1,651	June 14	June 15	2025 California wildfires	
Oskawalik	Alaska	Bethel	1,779	June 14	July 6	2025 Alaska wildfires	
Winnemucca Mountain	Nevada	Humboldt	2,321	June 15	June 17	2025 Nevada wildfires	
Caribou	Alaska	Yukon-Koyukuk	1,915	June 15	July 28	2025 Alaska wildfires – Caused by lightning.	
Alder Springs	Oregon	Jefferson, Deschutes	3,279	June 16	June 30	2025 Oregon wildfires – Prompted evacuations in the Terrebonne area.	
Telidaside	Alaska	Yukon-Koyukuk	1,733	June 16	July 2	2025 Alaska wildfires	
Hogatza	Alaska	Yukon-Koyukuk	29,280	June 16	August 8	2025 Alaska wildfires – Caused by lightning.	
Kawichiark 1	Alaska	Northwest Arctic	4,625	June 16	July 8	2025 Alaska wildfires – Caused by lightning.	
Kawichiark 2	Alaska	Northwest Arctic	2,667	June 16	June 27	2025 Alaska wildfires – Caused by lightning.	
Chicken	Alaska	Yukon-Koyukuk	8,071	June 16	August 11	2025 Alaska wildfires – Caused by lightning.	
Tetilesook	Alaska	Northwest Arctic	1,259	June 16	July 8	2025 Alaska wildfires – Caused by lightning.	
Wolf Hollow	Oregon	Gilliam	1,200	June 17	June 18	2025 Oregon wildfires	
Tagagawik	Alaska	Yukon-Koyukuk	1,378	June 17	July 8	2025 Alaska wildfires – Caused by lightning.	
Monte	California	San Diego	1,051	June 17	June 26	2025 California wildfires – Prompted evacuations in the Cleveland National Forest, near El Cajon.	
Wolf	Alaska	Yukon-Koyukuk	2,021	June 17	August 10	2025 Alaska wildfires – Caused by lightning.	
Obrien	Alaska	Yukon-Koyukuk	7,642	June 17	August 14	2025 Alaska wildfires – Caused by lightning.	
HelpMeJack	Alaska	Yukon-Koyukuk	3,172	June 17	August 14	2025 Alaska wildfires – Caused by lightning.	
Chabanika	Alaska	Yukon-Koyukuk	4,131	June 17	August 8	2025 Alaska wildfires – Caused by lightning.	
Kalusuk	Alaska	Northwest Arctic	1,062	June 17	July 8	2025 Alaska wildfires – Caused by lightning.	
Klikhtentotzna	Alaska	Yukon-Koyukuk	117,908	June 17	August 18	2025 Alaska wildfires – Caused by lightning.	
Kandik	Alaska	Southeast Fairbanks	5,327	June 18	August 14	2025 Alaska wildfires – Caused by lightning.	
Meadow Creek	Alaska	Yukon-Koyukuk	19,634	June 18	July 10	2025 Alaska wildfires – Caused by lightning.	
Kechumstuk Creek	Alaska	Southeast Fairbanks	12,604	June 18	August 6	2025 Alaska wildfires – Caused by lightning.	
Boulder Creek	Alaska	Fairbanks North Star	4,056	June 18	August 7	2025 Alaska wildfires – Caused by lightning.	
Orum	Alaska	Yukon-Koyukuk	5,647	June 18	August 16	2025 Alaska wildfires – Caused by lightning.	
Lush	Alaska	Yukon-Koyukuk	26,686	June 18	Unknown	2025 Alaska wildfires – Caused by lightning.	
Williams	Alaska	Yukon-Koyukuk	1,180	June 18	July 11	2025 Alaska wildfires – Caused by lightning.	
Aniralik	Alaska	Northwest Arctic	4,906	June 19	July 11	2025 Alaska wildfires – Caused by lightning.	
Mexico Assist	California	San Diego	26,000	June 19	2025	2025 California wildfires	
Forsyth	Utah	Washington	15,675	June 19	August 7	2025 Utah wildfires – Evacuated and threatened the town of Pine Valley.	
Twelvemile Lake	Alaska	Southeast Fairbanks	24,112	June 19	August 10	2025 Alaska wildfires – Caused by lightning.	
Ricks Creek	Alaska	Fairbanks North Star	16,848	June 19	August 7	2025 Alaska wildfires – Caused by lightning.	
Ninetyeight	Alaska	Fairbanks North Star	16,190	June 19	Unknown	2025 Alaska wildfires – Caused by lightning.	
Himalaya Road	Alaska	Fairbanks North Star	6,056	June 19	Unknown	2025 Alaska wildfires – Caused by lightning.	
Bear Creek	Alaska	Denali	30,988	June 19	Unknown	2025 Alaska wildfires – Caused by lightning. 34 reported residences destroyed.	
Moran	Alaska	Yukon-Koyukuk	13,819	June 19	August 17	2025 Alaska wildfires	
Bonnifield Creek	Alaska	Denali	17,337	June 19	August 14	2025 Alaska wildfires – Caused by lightning. 6 reported residences destroyed.	
Bonanza Creek	Alaska	Fairbanks North Star	17,337	June 19	August 14	2025 Alaska wildfires – Caused by lightning. 4 structures destroyed.	
Nelchina Glacier	Alaska	Matanuska-Susitna	3,920	June 19	Unknown	2025 Alaska wildfires	
7 Mile Lookout	Alaska	Southeast Fairbanks	4,094	June 19	Unknown	2025 Alaska wildfires – Caused by lightning.	
Susulatna	Alaska	Yukon-Koyukuk	3,031	June 19	July 10	2025 Alaska wildfires – Caused by lightning.	
Nowitna	Alaska	Yukon-Koyukuk	2,613	June 19	August 16	2025 Alaska wildfires – Caused by lightning.	
Elephant	Alaska	Yukon-Koyukuk	9,064	June 19	Unknown	2025 Alaska wildfires – Caused by lightning.	
Red	Alaska	Yukon-Koyukuk	14,525	June 19	August 16	2025 Alaska wildfires – Caused by lightning.	
Conner	Nevada	Douglas	17,714	June 20	June 30	2025 Nevada wildfires – Evacuated areas near Ruhenstroth.	
Ikheenjik	Alaska	Yukon-Koyukuk	19,650	June 20	August 20	2025 Alaska wildfires	
Turtle	Alaska	Yukon-Koyukuk	16,337	June 20	August 20	2025 Alaska wildfires	
Moldy	Alaska	Yukon-Koyukuk	72,216	June 20	August 9	2025 Alaska wildfires – Caused by lightning.	
McArthur Creek	Alaska	Southeast Fairbanks	7,148	June 20	August 6	2025 Alaska wildfires – Caused by lightning.	
Ridgeline	Alaska	Southeast Fairbanks	4,755	June 20	August 6	2025 Alaska wildfires – Caused by lightning.	
River Trail	Alaska	Southeast Fairbanks	23,827	June 20	August 16	2025 Alaska wildfires – Caused by lightning.	
Porphyry	Alaska	Southeast Fairbanks	2,641	June 20	July 9	2025 Alaska wildfires – Caused by lightning.	
Takoma	Alaska	Yukon-Koyukuk	19,889	June 20	August 20	2025 Alaska wildfires – Caused by lightning.	
Birch	Alaska	Yukon-Koyukuk	4,981	June 20	Unknown	2025 Alaska wildfires – Caused by lightning.	
Goldstream Creek	Alaska	Yukon-Koyukuk	20,470	June 20	Unknown	2025 Alaska wildfires	
Saint George Creek	Alaska	Denali	29,210	June 20	August 14	2025 Alaska wildfires – Caused by lightning. 4 reported residences destroyed.	
Fish Lake	Alaska	Copper River	1,841	June 20	July 9	2025 Alaska wildfires – Caused by lightning.	
Buckley Bar	Alaska	Yukon-Koyukuk	9,658	June 20	August 14	2025 Alaska wildfires – Caused by lightning.	
Dry Creek	Alaska	Denali	13,268	June 20	August 14	2025 Alaska wildfires – Caused by lightning.	
Aggie Creek	Alaska	Fairbanks North Star	34,837	June 20	Unknown	2025 Alaska wildfires – Caused by lightning.	
Live Trap	Alaska	Denali	2,503	June 20	July 22	2025 Alaska wildfires – Caused by lightning.	
Christian	Alaska	Yukon-Koyukuk	64,065	June 20	August 20	2025 Alaska wildfires – Caused by lightning.	
Michigan	Alaska	Yukon-Koyukuk	1,533	June 20	July 22	2025 Alaska wildfires – Caused by lightning.	
Salmon Trout	Alaska	Yukon-Koyukuk	1,303	June 20	August 20	2025 Alaska wildfires – Caused by lightning.	
Susulatna Hills	Alaska	Yukon-Koyukuk	8,711	June 20	July 10	2025 Alaska wildfires – Caused by lightning.	
Pilot Creek	Alaska	Yukon-Koyukuk	3,694	June 20	July 10	2025 Alaska wildfires – Caused by lightning.	
Sand Lake	Alaska	Southeast Fairbanks	6,353	June 21	August 10	2025 Alaska wildfires	
Yellow	Alaska	Yukon-Koyukuk	7,942	June 21	August 21	2025 Alaska wildfires – Caused by lightning.	
Kerulu	Alaska	Northwest Arctic	1,645	June 21	July 8	2025 Alaska wildfires – Caused by lightning.	
Barstow Road	Washington	Walla Walla	1,543	June 22	June 25	2025 Washington wildfires	
Indian Prairie Canal (22)	Florida	Glades	3,925	June 22	June 27	2025 Florida wildfires	
Ikpikpuk	Alaska	North Slope	1,995	June 22	July 8	2025 Alaska wildfires – Caused by lightning.	
Monte Cristo Creek	Alaska	Fairbanks North Star	8,772	June 22	August 11	2025 Alaska wildfires – Caused by lightning.	
Three Castle	Alaska	Southeast Fairbanks	2,134}	June 23	August 22	2025 Alaska wildfires – Caused by lightning.	
Runt	Alaska	Yukon-Koyukuk	16,018	June 23	August 23	2025 Alaska wildfires – Caused by lightning.	
Henry George West (29)	Florida	Hillsborough	1,200	June 24	July 1	2025 Florida wildfires	
Laguna	New Mexico	Rio Arriba	17,415	June 25	September 30	2025 New Mexico wildfires – Firefighters planned to treat to 13,000 acres of forest lands with firing operations. The fire had spotted outside of the lines and trapped 2 firefighters.	
Mauneluk	Alaska	Northwest Arctic	3,017	June 25	August 23	2025 Alaska wildfires – Caused by lightning.	
Oak Ridge	Arizona	Apache	11,027	June 28	July 16	2025 Arizona wildfires – Caused evacuations for Oak Springs and Hunters Point.	
Taylor Draw	Wyoming	Carbon	1,257	June 28	July 2	2025 Wyoming wildfires	
Wolf	California	Riverside	2,413	June 29	July 15	2025 California wildfires	
Mount Irish	Nevada	Lincoln	6,315	June 30	July 17	2025 Nevada wildfires	
Turkeyfeather	New Mexico	Catron	24,178	June 30	September 10	2025 New Mexico wildfires – Caused by lightning.	
Hall	Wyoming	Hot Springs	1,030	July 1	July 1	2025 Wyoming wildfires	
Garden Creek	Idaho	Bingham	5,418	July 1	July 3	2025 Idaho wildfires	
Black Canyon	Oregon	Lake	1,584	July 1	July 5	2025 Oregon wildfires	
Winter Camp	Idaho	Owyhee	3,697	July 1	July 1	2025 Idaho wildfires	
Mosquito	Florida	Monroe	8,373	July 1	July 11	2025 Florida wildfires – Caused by lightning.	
Madre	California	San Luis Obispo	80,786	July 2	July 26	2025 California wildfires – Prompted evacuations for areas in the Carrizo National Monument, and closed the entire monument to the public.	
Cold Springs	Oregon	Umatilla	2,489	July 2	July 10	2025 Oregon wildfires	
Apple Acres	Washington	Okanogan	3,410	July 2	July 21	2025 Washington wildfires – Human-caused. Restricted U.S. Route 97 to alternating traffic.	
Spring Creek	Wyoming	Platte	1,017	July 2	July 10	2025 Wyoming wildfires	
Wilder	Montana	Fergus	3,451	July 2	July 9	2025 Montana wildfires	
Green	California	Shasta	19,022	July 2	August 17	2025 California wildfires – Caused by lightning. Burned in the Shasta-Trinity National Forest.	
Butler	California	Siskiyou	21,058	July 3	August 16	2025 California wildfires – Caused by lightning. Burned in the Marble Mountain Wilderness.	
Barber	Nevada	Pershing	17,583	July 3	July 11	2025 Nevada wildfires – Caused by lightning.	
Bloody	Nevada	Humboldt	1,856	July 3	July 5	2025 Nevada wildfires – Caused by lightning.	
Sheep Creek Canyon	Nevada	Eureka	4,173	July 4	July 6	2025 Nevada wildfires	
Bartlett	Nevada	Humboldt	6,169	July 4	July 9	2025 Nevada wildfires – Caused by lightning.	
Tsukon	Alaska	Yukon-Koyukuk	1,483	July 4	August 23	2025 Alaska wildfires – Caused by lightning.	
Dragon Bravo	Arizona	Coconino	145,504	July 4	September 28	2025 Arizona wildfires – Caused by lightning. Evacuated the north rim of the Grand Canyon. Destroyed over 80 structures, including the historic Grand Canyon Lodge. Saw over nine consecutive days of critical and extreme fire behavior starting July 23. Tenth largest wildfire in Arizona history.	
Sikik	Alaska	Northwest Arctic	14,526	July 6	August 2	2025 Alaska wildfires – Caused by lightning.	
Gothic	Nevada	Nye	35,161	July 6	August 21	2025 Nevada wildfires – Burned on the Nevada Test and Training Range.	
Bear Gulch	Washington	Mason	20,233	July 6	November 6	2025 Washington wildfires – Burnt in the Olympic National Park. Evacuated the Staircase Ridge area.	
13 Mile	Florida	Palm Beach	13,000	July 7	July 15	2025 Florida wildfires	
Wheeler	Alaska	Yukon-Koyukuk	39,209	July 7	September 10	2025 Alaska wildfires – Caused by lightning.	
Portage	Alaska	Yukon-Koyukuk	2,900	July 7	July 22	2025 Alaska wildfires – Caused by lightning.	
Kaliguricheark	Alaska	Northwest Arctic	11,493	July 7	August 19	2025 Alaska wildfires – Caused by lightning.	
Nuna	Alaska	Northwest Arctic	15,018	July 7	August 19	2025 Alaska wildfires – Caused by lightning.	
Continental	Alaska	Yukon-Koyukuk	1,006	July 7	August 24	2025 Alaska wildfires – Caused by lightning.	
Iron	Florida	Miami Dade	1,374	July 8	July 11	2025 Florida wildfires	
Hot Canyon	Nevada	Elko	12,794	July 8	July 22	2025 Nevada wildfires – Lightning-caused.	
Elk	Oregon	Klamath	2,640	July 8	July 23	2025 Oregon wildfires	
Mica	Utah	Tooele	1,600	July 8	July 16	2025 Utah wildfires	
Tutusuk	Alaska	Northwest Arctic	5,924	July 8	August 24	2025 Alaska wildfires – Caused by lightning.	
Hope	Washington	Stevens	8,177	July 8	August 9	2025 Washington wildfires	
Anguitakada	Alaska	Northwest Arctic	9,510	July 9	August 25	2025 Alaska wildfires – Caused by lightning.	
Western Pines	Washington	Lincoln	5,781	July 9	July 18	2025 Washington wildfires	
Willow	Oregon	Crook	4,417	July 9	July 21	2025 Oregon wildfires – Caused by lightning.	
White Sage	Arizona	Coconino	58,985	July 9	August 14	2025 Arizona wildfires – Caused by lightning.	
Reed	Alaska	Northwest Arctic	3,395	July 9	August 25	2025 Alaska wildfires – Caused by lightning.	
Muskox	Alaska	Northwest Arctic	1,150	July 9	August 25	2025 Alaska wildfires – Caused by lightning.	
Big Bear	Idaho	Idaho	16,220	July 9	September 25	2025 Idaho wildfires – Caused by lightning. Burnt in the Payette National Forest.	
Billy	Arizona	Gila	27,574	July 9	September 15	2025 Arizona wildfires – Caused by lightning.	
Goose	New Mexico	Grant	3,692	July 9	July 31	2025 New Mexico wildfires – Caused by lightning.	
Deer Creek	Utah, Colorado	San Juan (UT), Montrose (CO)	17,724	July 10	August 11	2025 Utah wildfires – Destroyed 12 structures. Produced a major fire whirl.	
South Rim	Colorado	Montrose	4,232	July 10	September 11, 2025	2025 Colorado wildfires – Caused by lightning. Burnt in the Black Canyon of the Gunnison National Park.	
Sowbelly	Colorado	Montrose, Delta, Mesa	2,274	July 10	August 1	2025 Colorado wildfires – Caused by lightning. Burnt in the Dominguez-Escalante National Conservation Area.	
Turner Gulch	Colorado	Mesa	31,699	July 10	September 2	2025 Colorado wildfires – Caused by lightning.	
Rush	Idaho	Valley	7,907	July 10	September 25	2025 Idaho wildfires – Caused by lightning.	
Grassy	Idaho	Fremont	2,018	July 11	July 13	2025 Idaho wildfires	
Johnny Buck	Florida	Miami-Dade	1,034	July 11	July 28	2025 Florida wildfires	
Burnt	Alaska	Yukon-Koyukuk	1,209	July 11	August 25	2025 Alaska wildfires – Caused by lightning.	
Cram	Oregon	Jefferson	95,736	July 13	July 26	2025 Oregon wildfires – Evacuated areas near and in Ashwood. Destroyed 4 homes and 2 other structures.	
Monroe Canyon	Utah	Sevier, Piute	73,721	July 13	September 4	2025 Utah wildfires – Produced large pyrocumulonimbus clouds that fueled rapid spread. Burned over 10,000 acres in one day during a major flare-up on July 25. Destroyed 10 structures.	
Helix	Oregon	Umatilla	3,472	July 14	July 15	2025 Oregon wildfires – A burn-over destroyed a Milton-Freewater Rural Fire Department engine, and one firefighter was treated and released for smoke inhalation.	
Camp	Alaska	Fairbanks North Star	1,677	July 14	August 22	2025 Alaska wildfires – Caused by lightning.	
Tindall	Idaho	Owyhee	1,697	July 15	July 16	2025 Idaho wildfires	
Cabin	Arizona	Coconino	1,048	July 15	August 2	2025 Arizona wildfires – Caused by lightning.	
Cornucopia	Nevada	Elko	3,514	July 15	July 18	2025 Nevada wildfires – Caused by lightning.	
Buckboard	Idaho	Oneida	1,695	July 15	July 17	2025 Idaho wildfires	
Boundary	Washington	Yakima	1,210	July 15	July 17	2025 Washington wildfires – Human-caused.	
Dale	California	Riverside	1,096	July 16	July 22	2025 California wildfires	
Black Hills	Oregon	Malheur	4,958	July 17	July 19	2025 Oregon wildfires	
Mendiola Road	Oregon	Malheur	1,641	July 18	July 20	2025 Oregon wildfires	
Burdoin	Washington	Klickitat	10,675	July 18	Unknown	2025 Washington wildfires – Destroyed at least 19 residential structures.	
Butte Creek	Oregon	Wasco	2,079	July 18	August 5	2025 Oregon wildfires	
MM65 I84	Idaho	Ada	8,902	July 19	July 20	2025 Idaho wildfires – Human-caused.	
Lake Spokane	Washington	Stevens	2,512	July 19	July 30	2025 Washington wildfires – Human-caused. Destroyed 2 residential structures.	
Gold	Nevada	Washoe	1,226	July 20	July 25	2025 Nevada wildfires – Human-caused. Burned outside of Golden Eagle Regional Park.	
Ripple	Alaska	Yukon-Koyukuk	3,940	July 9	August 25	2025 Alaska wildfires – Caused by lightning.	
Cat Canyon	Nevada	Nye	16,260	July 20	August 21	2025 Nevada wildfires – Caused by lightning. Burnt on the Nevada Test and Training Range.	
North Marsh	Florida	Volusia	5,145	July 22	August 28	2025 Florida wildfires	
Mammoth	California	Modoc	2,533	July 25	July 31	2025 California wildfires – Caused by lightning. Burnt in the Modoc National Forest.	
Vees	Wyoming	Washakie	5,229	July 26	August 16	2025 Wyoming wildfires – Caused by lightning on BLM lands.	
War Creek	South Dakota	Jones	2,602	July 26	July 29	2025 South Dakota wildfires – Human-caused.	
Little John	Oregon	Malheur	12,973	July 27	July 29	2025 Oregon wildfires – Caused by lightning.	
Stoner Mesa	Colorado	Dolores, Montezuma	10,249	July 28	October 16	2025 Colorado wildfires – Lightning-caused. Burnt in the San Juan National Forest.	
Blackstone	Idaho	Owyhee	22,605	July 29	July 30	2025 Idaho wildfires – Caused by lightning.	
Rock Creek	Oregon	Malheur	31,192	July 29	August 4	2025 Oregon wildfires – Caused by lightning.	
Mill	Idaho	Lemhi	1,819	July 29	August 6	2025 Idaho wildfires – Caused by lightning.	
Lost Tom	Oregon	Malheur	1,124	July 29	July 31	2025 Oregon wildfires – Caused by lightning.	
Moonshine	Nevada	Humboldt	2,863	July 29	August 2	2025 Nevada wildfires – Caused by lightning.	
Sales Yard	Washington	Benton	1,246	July 29	October 2	2025 Washington wildfires	
Salt Lake	Texas	Brazoria	1,025	July 30	August 1	2025 Texas wildfires	
Striker	Idaho	Owyhee	6,000	July 31	July 31	2025 Idaho wildfires – Lightning-caused.	
Lightning Creek	Idaho	Bonner	2,522	July 31	October 21	2025 Idaho wildfires – Caused by lightning. Burnt in the Idaho Panhandle National Forests.	
Range	Idaho	Ada	26,922	July 31	August 2	2025 Idaho wildfires – Caused by lightning.	
Elkhorn	Idaho	Custer	1,356	August 1	September 11	2025 Idaho wildfires – Caused by lightning. Burnt in the Salmon-Challis National Forest.	
Island Creek	Idaho	Idaho	14,943	August 1	October 7	2025 Idaho wildfires – Burnt in the Nez Perce National Forest.	
Gifford	California	San Luis Obispo, Santa Barbara	131,614	August 1	October 14	2025 California wildfires – Burnt in the Los Padres National Forest. Prompted mass evacuations.	
Jakes	Nevada	Elko	82,216	August 1	August 16	2025 Nevada wildfires – Caused by lightning. Merged with the Snowstorm Fire on August 4th & the MP 22 Fire on August 7th.	
MP 22	Nevada	Elko	3,829	August 1	August 6	2025 Nevada wildfires – Caused by lightning. Merged with the Jakes Fire.	
Middle Mesa	New Mexico	Rio Arriba	5,031	August 1	Unknown	2025 New Mexico wildfires – Lightning-caused. Burnt in the Carson National Forest.	
Elk RBX	Colorado	Rio Blanco	14,518	August 2	August 16	2025 Colorado wildfires – Caused by lightning.	
Adobe Mtn	Nevada	Elko	10,668	August 2	August 11	2025 Nevada wildfires – Caused by lightning.	
Lee	Colorado	Rio Blanco	137,758	August 2	September 13	2025 Colorado wildfires – Caused by lightning. Prompted evacuations for Meeker. Destroyed 7 structures.	
Bronco	Arizona	Gila	18,041	August 3	August 25	2025 Arizona wildfires – Caused by lightning.	
Backbone	Louisiana	Natchitoches	2,409	August 3	August 25	2025 Louisiana wildfires	
Tullock	Montana	Big Horn	1,469	August 4	August 8	2025 Montana wildfires	
Rosa	California	Riverside	1,671	August 4	August 12	2025 California wildfires	
Gold	California	San Bernardino	1,036	August 4	August 28	2025 California wildfires	
Twelve	Colorado	Moffat	4,287	August 6	August 11	2025 Colorado wildfires – Human-caused.	
Indian Creek	Arizona	Gila	3,000	August 5	September 6	2025 Arizona wildfires – Caused by lightning.	
Goodwin	Arizona	Graham	1,059	August 6	August 24	2025 Arizona wildfires – Lightning-caused.	
Beulah	Utah	Summit	5,719	August 7	September 25	2025 Utah wildfires	
Canyon	California	Ventura, Los Angeles	5,370	August 7	August 14	2025 California wildfires – Prompted evacuations for Castaic. One firefighter suffered major injuries after a vehicle rollover.	
Vereda Blanca	New Mexico	Sandoval	1,307	August 8	Unknown	2025 New Mexico wildfires – Lightning-caused. Burnt in the Cibola National Forest.	
Big Springs	Utah	Tooele	1,486	August 9	August 11	2025 Utah wildfires	
Crosho	Colorado	Rio Blanco, Routt	2,073	August 11	August 25	2025 Colorado wildfires	
Mission Butte	Montana	Big Horn	6,149	August 12	November 6	2025 Montana wildfires	
Rock	Idaho	Adams, Valley	2,796	August 13	September 30	2025 Idaho wildfires – Lightning-caused. Burnt in the Boise National Forest.	
Box	Idaho	Owyhee	4,316	August 13	August 28	2025 Idaho wildfires – Lightning-caused.	
Horn	Montana	Madison	2,800	August 13	August 22	2025 Montana wildfires	
Red Canyon	Wyoming	Hot Springs	24,709	August 13	September 25	2025 Wyoming wildfires – Caused by lightning.	
Summer Springs	Montana	Treasure	2,568	August 13	August 24	2025 Montana wildfires	
Sunset	Idaho	Bonner	3,183	August 13	September 1	2025 Idaho wildfires – Destroyed 8 structures.	
Central Ferry	Washington	Whitman	6,597	August 13	August 17	2025 Washington wildfires	
Pony Creek	Montana	Rosebud	1,224	August 13	August 15	2025 Montana wildfires – Lightning-caused.	
Bivens Creek	Montana	Madison	2,126	August 13	September 8	2025 Montana wildfires	
Mire	Idaho	Idaho, Clearwater	1,400	August 13	October 19	2025 Idaho wildfires	
Cloudrest	Montana	Madison	3,224	August 14	October 18	2025 Montana wildfires	
Spring Creek	Wyoming	Washakie	3,599	August 14	August 31	2025 Wyoming wildfires – Caused by lightning.	
Sleeper Ranch	Wyoming	Park	20,657	August 14	September 11	2025 Wyoming wildfires – Caused by lightning.	
Windy Rock	Montana	Powell	6,175	August 14	November 6	2025 Montana wildfires – Lightning-caused.	
Rancho	Nevada	Washoe	1,483	August 14	August 20	2025 Nevada wildfires – Human-caused.	
Cottonwood Peak	Nevada	Elko	132,604	August 15	September 23	2025 Nevada wildfires – Lightning-caused.	
Hooker Creek	Idaho, Oregon	Malheur (OR), Owyhee (ID)	2,280	August 16	August 20	2025 Idaho wildfires, 2025 Oregon wildfires	
McAllister	Montana	Madison	3,560	August 16	August 26	2025 Montana wildfires	
Marceaux	Louisiana	Cameron	1,456	August 17	September 18	2025 Louisiana wildfires	
Derby	Colorado	Garfield, Eagle	5,453	August 17	December 11	2025 Colorado wildfires – Lightning-caused. Burnt in the White River National Forest.	
Knowles	Montana	Sanders	3,816	August 17	September 14	2025 Montana wildfires – Human-caused.	
Mile Marker 39 (06)	Florida	Broward	48,000	August 18	August 26	2025 Florida wildfires – Caused by lightning. Burnt in the Everglades National Park.	
East	Idaho	Idaho	2,250	August 20	August 29	2025 Idaho wildfires	
Rhoda Creek	Idaho	Idaho	2,700	August 20	Unknown	2025 Idaho wildfires – Lightning-caused. Burned in the Clearwater National Forest.	
Pickett	California	Napa	6,819	August 21	September 7	2025 California wildfires	
Dollar Lake	Wyoming	Sublette	19,467	August 21	October 6	2025 Wyoming wildfires – Burnt in the Bridger-Teton National Forest.	
Flat	Oregon	Deschutes, Jefferson	23,346	August 21	September 8	2025 Oregon wildfires – Human-caused. Destroyed 5 structures.	
Little	California	Kern	2,506	August 22	September 5	2025 California wildfires	
5 Mile 2025	Texas	Kleberg	5,747	August 22	August 25	2025 Texas wildfires	
Willow Creek	Wyoming	Lincoln	4,066	August 22	September 25	2025 Wyoming wildfires	
Split Top	Idaho	Blaine	5,447	August 23	August 24	2025 Idaho wildfires – Human-caused.	
Garnet	California	Fresno	59,844	August 24	October 23	2025 California wildfires – Lightning-caused. Burnt in the Sierra National Forest. Caused evacuations for Balch Camp.	
Big Butte	Nevada	Elko	3,612	August 24	August 26	2025 Nevada wildfires – Lightning-caused.	
Walk	Idaho	Idaho	1,050	August 24	August 30	2025 Idaho wildfires	
Emigrant	Oregon	Lane	33,129	August 24	November 17	2025 Oregon wildfires – Lightning-caused. Burnt in the Willamette National Forest. Produced major pyrocumulonimbus clouds.	
Dillon	California	Siskiyou	11,929	August 25	November 6	2025 California wildfires – Lightning-caused. Burnt in the Six Rivers National Forest.	
Wildcat	Washington	Yakima	15,592	August 25	December 22	2025 Washington wildfires	
Blue	California	Siskiyou	3,713	August 27	October 11	2025 California wildfires – Lightning-caused. Burnt in the Klamath National Forest.	
Log	California	Siskiyou	1,170	August 27	October 2	2025 California wildfires – Lightning-caused. Burnt in the Klamath National Forest.	
Perry	Washington	Whatcom	1,772	August 27	October 12	2025 Washington wildfires	
Butte	Oregon	Malheur	4,912	August 28	August 29	2025 Oregon wildfires	
Hatch Grade	Oregon	Umatilla	7,585	August 28	September 2	2025 Oregon wildfires	
Crown Creek	Washington	Stevens	14,192	August 29	October 12	2025 Washington wildfires	
R-14 Buffalo	Nevada	Washoe	1,286	August 29	September 6	2025 Nevada wildfires	
Ulm Creek	Idaho	Shoshone	2,929	August 30	October 6	2025 Idaho wildfires	
Katy Creek	Washington	Ferry	4,680	August 30	October 12	2025 Washington wildfires	
White Pine	Idaho	Latah	1,042	August 31	October 29	2025 Idaho wildfires	
Labor Mountain	Washington	Kittitas	42,967	September 1	November 5	2025 Washington wildfires	
Lower Sugarloaf	Washington	Chelan	42,980	September 1	November 1	2025 Washington wildfires	
Tacoma Creek	Washington	Stevens	3,960	September 1	September 30	2025 Washington wildfires	
Rattlesnake	Washington	Ferry	21,845	September 1	Unknown	2025 Washington wildfires	
Isabella	Montana	Sanders	1,411	September 1	October 24	2025 Montana wildfires – Lightning-caused.	
2-2	California	Stanislaus	3,462	September 2	September 5	2025 California wildfires – Lightning-caused. part of the TCU September Lightning Complex.	
6-5	California	Tuolumne	7,036	September 2	September 13	2025 California wildfires – Lightning-caused. Part of the TCU September Lightning Complex. Destroyed at least 86 structures and damaged 6 in Chinese Camp.	
Salt	California	Fresno	25,643	September 2	September 12	2025 California wildfires – Lightning-caused.	
1-4	California	Mariposa	4,451	September 2	September 5	2025 California wildfires – Lightning-caused.	
6-2	California	Tuolumne	1,025	September 2	September 12	2025 California wildfires – Lightning-caused. Part of the TCU September Lightning Complex.	
2-8	California	Calaveras	1,332	September 2	September 9	2025 California wildfires – Lightning-caused. Part of the TCU September Lightning Complex.	
Marmon	California	Fresno	1,034	September 2	September 5	2025 California wildfires – Lightning-caused.	
Marks Creek	Oregon	Crook	1,718	September 2	November 6	2025 Oregon wildfires	
Lynx Mountain	Washington	Ferry	9,226	September 2	October 12	2025 Washington wildfires	
Sentinel	Nevada	Humboldt	1,247	September 3	September 8	2025 Nevada wildfires – Lightning-caused.	
Timber Butte	Montana	Beaverhead	2,245	September 3	September 22	2025 Montana wildfires	
Moon Complex	Oregon	Curry, Coos	19,520	September 3	March 9, 2026	2025 Oregon wildfires – Lightning-caused. Consists of the Pinnacle and Backbone fires.	
Black Rock	Oregon	Wasco	43,842	September 4	September 19	2025 Oregon wildfires	
Kelsey Peak	Oregon	Curry	1,039	September 4	Unknown	2025 Oregon wildfires – Lightning-caused.	
Kraft	Montana	Powder River	1,500	September 6	September 7	2025 Montana wildfires	
Wooden Road	Washington	Walla Walla	2,240	September 8	September 9	2025 Washington wildfires	
Boyd	Nebraska	Garden	1,248	September 9	September 15	2025 Nebraska wildfires	
Salmon Forks	Montana	Flathead, Powell	2,454	September 12	October 16	2025 Montana wildfires – Lightning-caused.	
Unknown	Washington	Walla Walla	1,500	September 26	September 26	2025 Washington wildfires	
Incident 1107	Oregon	Jefferson	3,788	September 28	September 29	2025 Oregon wildfires	
Tule	Texas	Briscoe	2,547	October 4	October 5	2025 Texas wildfires	
Matagorda South	Texas	Calhoun	2,300	November 2	November 6	2025 Texas wildfires	
Large Impact	Colorado	El Paso	5,500	November 5	November 8	2025 Colorado wildfires	
Bald Mountain	Virginia	Craig	4,374	November 5	November 18	Closed forest roads.	
Mana Road	Hawaii	Hawaii	2,125	November 7	November 20		
Pack	California	Mono	1,974	November 13	December 5	2025 California wildfires	
Concord	Alabama	Montgomery	1,427	November 16	December 3	Burned 6 miles (9.7 km) northwest of Talladega.	
1039	Missouri	Barry	1,220	November 17	November 18	2025 Missouri wildfires	
L	Colorado	Yuma	2,000	December 17	December 18	2025 Colorado wildfires	
33	Colorado	Yuma	10,127	December 17	December 18	2025 Colorado wildfires	
Unknown	Kansas	Russell	3,000	December 18	December 18	2025 Kansas wildfires	

Perimeters of wildfires in the United States during 2025 (Red: >1000 acres) (map data)
