= 2025 North Dakota wildfires =

Natural disasters in the USA

The 2025 North Dakota wildfires were a series of wildfires that burned in the U.S. state of North Dakota.

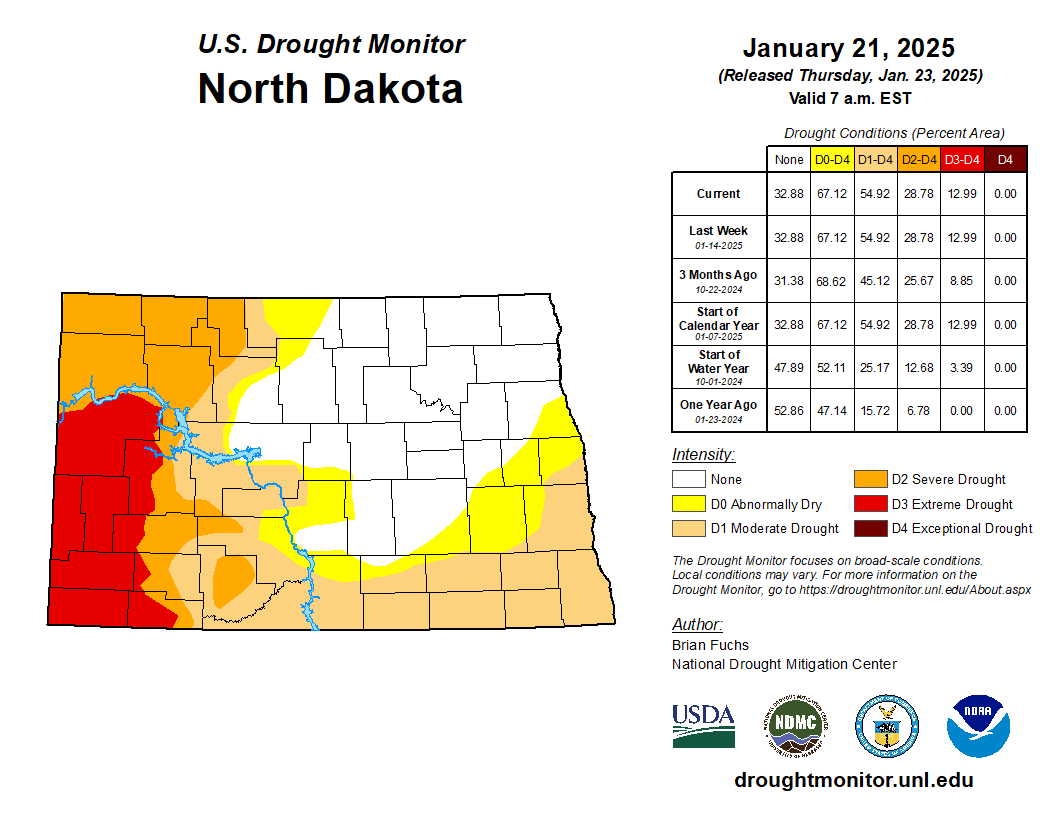
North Dakota Drought Monitor on January 21, 2025

== List of wildfires ==
The following is a list of fires that burned more than 1,000 acres (400 ha), produced significant structural damage, or resulted in casualties.

Name	County	Acres	Start date	Containment date (Note: Containment means that fire crews have established and secured control lines around the fire's perimeter. These lines are artificial barriers, like trenches or cleared vegetation, designed to stop the fire's spread, or natural barriers like rivers. Containment reflects progress in managing the fire but does not necessarily mean the fire is starved of fuel, under control, or put out.)	Notes	Ref.
Paur	Grand Forks	1,816	March 6	March 6		
Highway 49	Grant	3,960	March 11	March 11		
Cedar River	Sioux, Grant, Adams	8,960	April 9	April 13	Burned on South Dakota border 13 miles (21 km) north of Lemmon, South Dakota.	
Hwy 14	Sheridan	4,100	April 12	April 12	Injured two firefighters.	
Unknown	Mountrail	1,600	May 4	May 5		
Potato Hill	Emmons	1,302	April 12	April 12		
Buckhorn Archery	Rolette	1,308	April 30	May 14		
Backburn	Rolette	1,342	May 3	May 15		
Unknown	Mountrail	1,600	May 4	May 5		
Pouch Point	Mountrail	2,000	May 4	May 14		

Perimeters of wildfires in North Dakota during 2025 (Red: >1000 acres) (map data)

== See also ==
- 2025 United States wildfires
