= 2025 Tennessee wildfires =

Natural disasters in the USA

The 2025 Tennessee wildfires were a series of wildfiress that burned in the U.S. state of Tennessee.

== Background ==
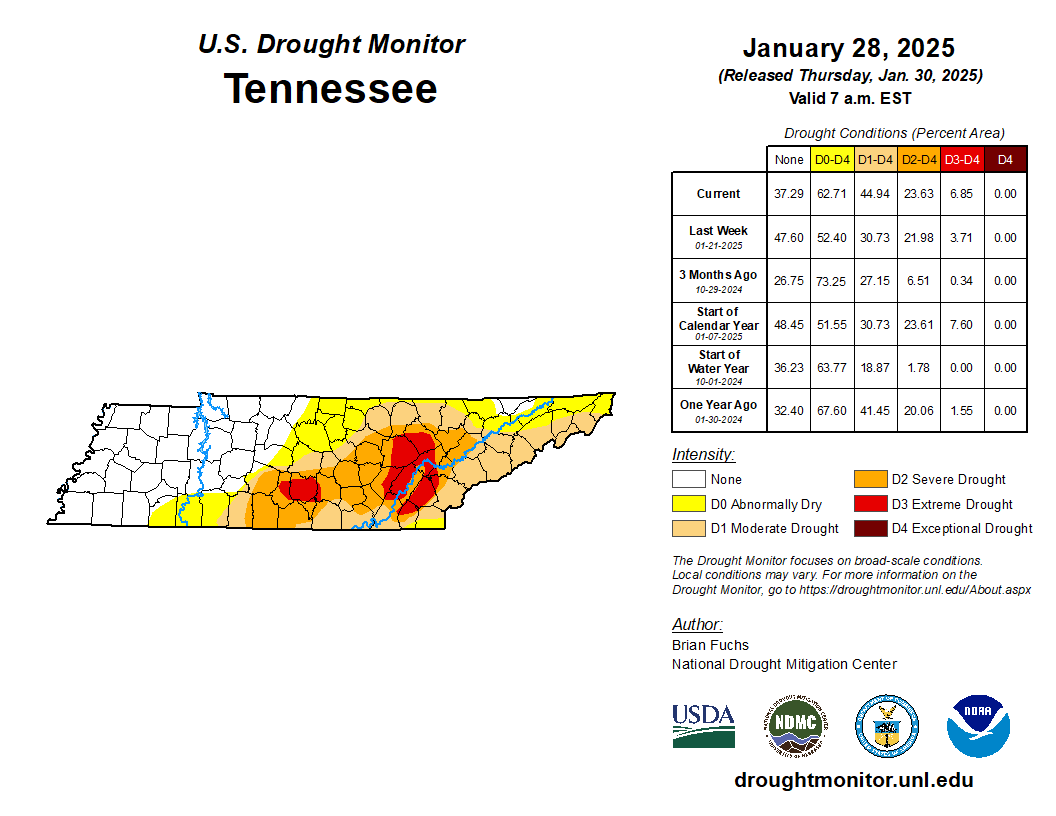
Tennessee Drought Monitor on January 28, 2025

Historically, Tennessee has two distinct periods of heightened wildfire activity, referred to as "fire seasons." The spring fire season typically occurs from February 15 to May 15, when low humidity, dry vegetation, and gusty winds can lead to rapid fire spread. This season generally ends when leaf-out and increased humidity reduce flammability.

The fall fire season generally runs from October 15 to December 15, when fallen leaves, dry grasses, and reduced rainfall create favorable conditions for ignition. Although spring sees a higher number of wildfires, many of the state's largest and most destructive fires, such as those during the 2016 Great Smoky Mountains wildfires, have occurred in the fall.

Wildfires can occur at any time of year in Tennessee, particularly during periods of drought or when human-caused ignition sources, such as debris burning, are present. A state burn permit is required for outdoor debris fires between October 15 and May 15 in areas where local restrictions do not apply.

== Summary ==
Tennessee’s 2025 wildfire season remains active, with most activity concentrated during the spring and fall “burn windows.”

Historically, more than 90% of wildfires in Tennessee are caused by humans (e.g. debris burning, equipment sparks, escaped burns). To curb risk, the Tennessee Department of Agriculture Division of Forestry (TDF) requires free burn permits for leaf or debris burning during the October 15–May 15 period.

Smoke from active fires has been tracked via the Tennessee Wildfire Public Viewer, with haze and reduced visibility in some counties when wind is light or inversions form.

== List of wildfires ==
The following is a list of fires that burned more than 1,000 acres (400 ha), produced significant structural damage, or resulted in casualties.

Name	County	Acres	Start date	Containment date (Note: Containment means that fire crews have established and secured control lines around the fire's perimeter. These lines are artificial barriers, like trenches or cleared vegetation, designed to stop the fire's spread, or natural barriers like rivers. Containment reflects progress in managing the fire but does not necessarily mean the fire is starved of fuel, under control, or put out.)	Notes	Ref.
Sevier - East Parkway	Sevier	1,087	March 4	March 14		
Big Glow	Greene	2,875	March 20	March 24		

Perimeters of wildfires in Tennessee during 2025 (Red: >1000 acres) (map data)

== See also ==
- 2025 United States wildfires
