= 2025 Mississippi wildfires =

Natural disasters in the USA

The 2025 Mississippi wildfires were a series of wildfires that burned in the U.S. state of Mississippi.

== Background ==
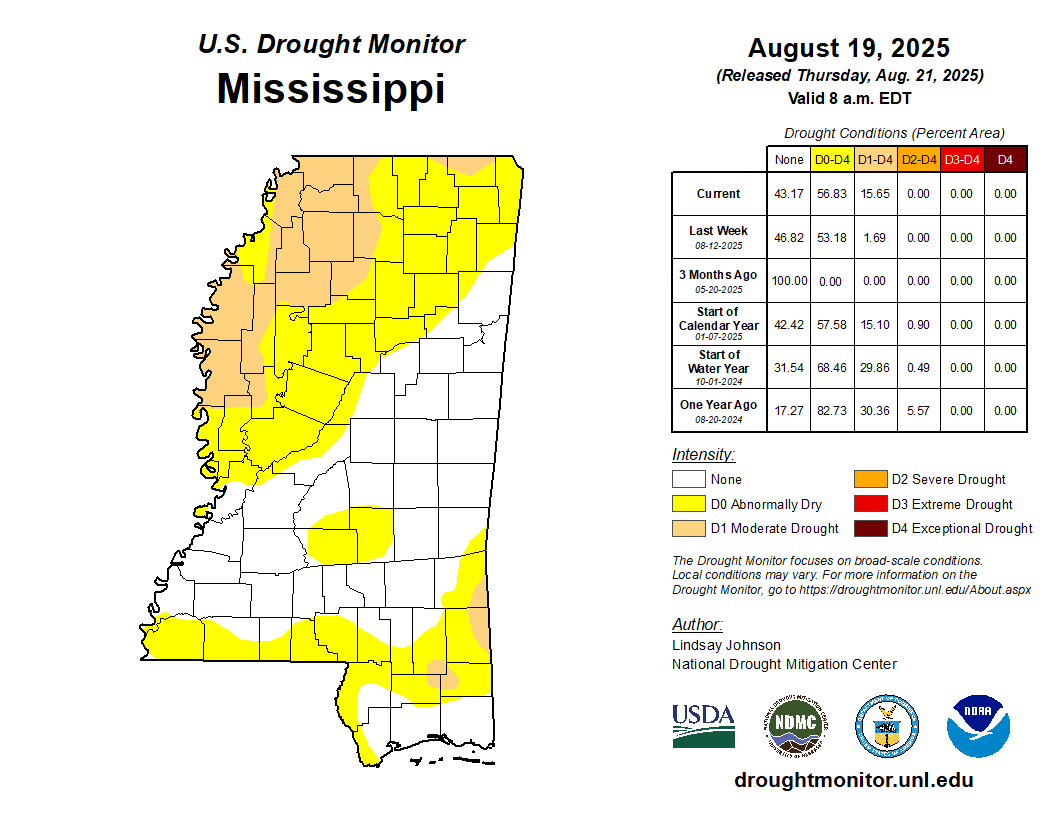
Mississippi Drought Monitor on August 19, 2025

While the typical "fire season" in Mississippi varies every year based on weather conditions, most wildfires occur in between January–March and July–November. However, hotter, drier conditions can allow wildfires to start outside of the typical fire period. Wildfires are most prevalent between January and March. Vegetation is abundant during these periods, while overall conditions typically result in a humid subtropical climate. The increase of vegetation (fuel) and reduced moisture levels can make the fires spread easier.

== Summary ==
By mid-2025, Mississippi has seen an uptick in small wildfires. In Stone County, for example, drought conditions contributed to 85 reported fires in August, burning about 830 acres statewide for that month. Through early September, the state recorded 84 additional fires covering just over 1,000 acres.

Smoke from the cumulative smaller fires has degraded air quality in rural areas and sometimes in more populated counties during inversion events or when winds are weak.

== List of wildfires ==
The following is a list of fires that burned more than 1,000 acres (400 ha), produced significant structural damage, or resulted in casualties.

Name	County	Acres	Start date	Containment date (Note: Containment means that fire crews have established and secured control lines around the fire's perimeter. These lines are artificial barriers, like trenches or cleared vegetation, designed to stop the fire's spread, or natural barriers like rivers. Containment reflects progress in managing the fire but does not necessarily mean the fire is starved of fuel, under control, or put out.)	Notes/Ref.
Fixed Wing	Perry	1,750	January 30	January 30	
Shoot House	Perry	6,082	March 2	March 2	Burned in Camp Shelby Joint Forces Training Center. Caused around $18,000 in damage.
Blue Stem	Franklin	2,031	March 13	March 13	
Greene - Turner Road	Greene	2,281	March 18	March 23	
Flat Rock	Benton	1,145	March 22	March 23	

Perimeters of wildfires in Mississippi during 2025 (Red: >1000 acres) (map data)

== See also ==
- 2025 United States wildfires
