= 2025 Kansas wildfires =

Natural disasters in the USA

The 2025 Kansas wildfires were a series of wildfires that burned in the U.S. state of Kansas.

== Background ==
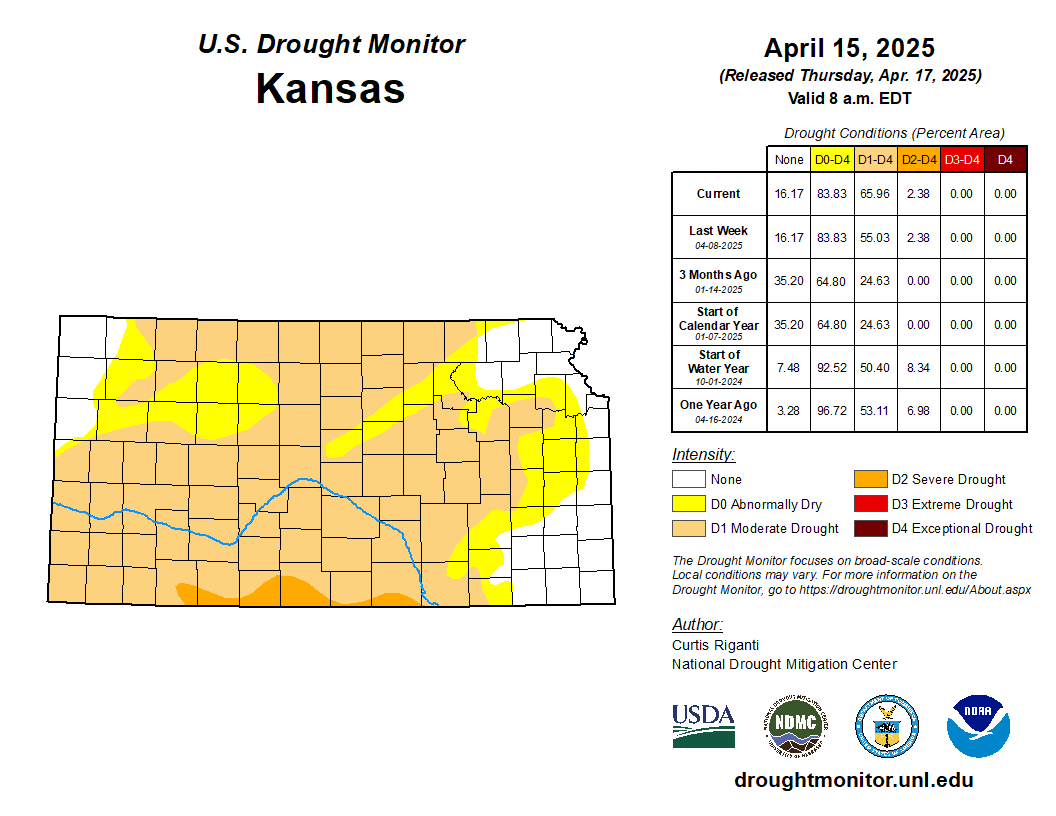
Kansas Drought Monitor on April 15, 2025

Kansas regularly experiences its most active wildfire period during March and April, before vegetation begins to green up. This is due to a combination of dry fuels, strong winds, and low humidity—conditions that foster fast-spreading fires. In 2014, Kansas recorded a record 8,075 wildfires, burning 187,000 acres, following this typical seasonal pattern.

Weather patterns are a primary driver of these outbreaks. Kansas State University meteorologist Chip Redmond emphasizes that short-term, weather-driven events—such as dry frontal passages with strong winds—are far more responsible for Kansas megafires than longer-term drought conditions. These dynamic systems, common in early spring, often produce the ignition and spread conditions that state firefighting resources must scramble to contain.

Recent observations suggest the timing and duration of Kansas's fire season are shifting. In 2025, early-season activity followed a slow start in winter moisture, but conditions aligned later in March and April for rapid wildfire escalation. Officials forecasted an above-average spring fire season, because fuels—grasses and brush—were drying quickly, despite earlier rainfall.

Land managers also recognize that burning during the growing season (July to September) can offer safer, more controlled outcomes when compared to the volatile dormant-season fires. Growing-season burns are conducted under higher humidity and more predictable conditions, reducing the likelihood of fires escaping control. These prescribed burns serve ecosystem functions such as woody vegetation management and improved wildlife habitat, although they do produce more smoke and must be carefully scheduled.

More recently, Climate Central’s analysis confirms that Kansas is experiencing more frequent "fire weather" days characterized by hot, dry, and windy conditions. This trend is extending the potential wildfire season beyond historical norms and putting added strain on local firefighters and rural communities. Alarmingly, fires caused by human negligence—like unattended campfires or equipment sparks—account for nearly 87% of wildfire ignitions in the state.

== List of wildfires ==
The following is a list of fires that burned more than 1,000 acres (400 ha), produced significant structural damage, or resulted in casualties.

Name	County	Acres	Start date	Containment date (Note: Containment means that fire crews have established and secured control lines around the fire's perimeter. These lines are artificial barriers, like trenches or cleared vegetation, designed to stop the fire's spread, or natural barriers like rivers. Containment reflects progress in managing the fire but does not necessarily mean the fire is starved of fuel, under control, or put out.)	Notes/Ref
Doiser	Grant	1,651	March 1	March 4	
Lake Wabaunsee	Wabaunsee	1,200	March 14	March 20	
170 Rd V5	Lyon	1,100	March 14	March 14	
212 Road	Cowley	1,500	March 14	March 14	
South Big Creek	Woodson	1,450	March 14	March 14	
Y5	Lyon	1,500	March 14	March 18	

Perimeters of wildfires in Kansas during 2025 (Red: >1000 acres) (map data)

== See also ==
- 2025 United States wildfires
