= 2025 Arkansas wildfires =

Natural disasters in the USA

The 2025 Arkansas wildfires were a series of wildfires that burned in the U.S. state of Arkansas.

== Background ==
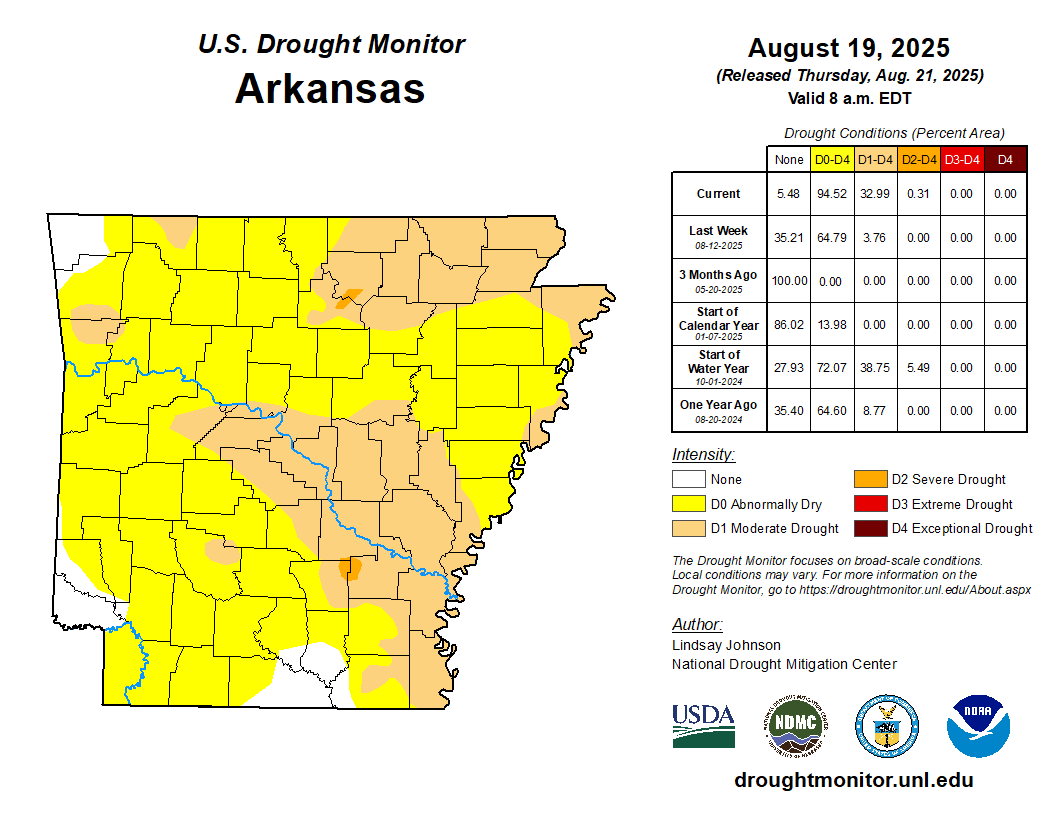
Arkansas Drought Monitor on August 19, 2025

Arkansas experiences two main wildfire seasons each year. The late winter–early spring season typically occurs from February through April, when dry dormant vegetation, low humidity, and gusty winds contribute to rapid fire spread. Seasonal rains and new vegetation growth usually bring this period to a close by late spring.

The late summer–fall season generally spans August through November, when hot, dry weather and accumulated leaf litter create favorable conditions for ignition. This season often peaks in October and November, coinciding with harvest activities, prescribed burns, and increased outdoor debris burning.

Wildfires in Arkansas can occur year-round, especially during periods of drought or when human-caused ignition sources are present. While Arkansas does not maintain a permanent statewide burn-permit requirement, burn bans may be issued at the county level when fire danger is high. The Arkansas Forestry Division encourages landowners to consult local fire officials before conducting any outdoor burning.

== Summary ==
Arkansas’s 2025 wildfire season began unusually early. In mid-March, a rare outbreak of fires across the state was fueled by dry fuels and high winds. Fire crews responded to at least 54 separate wildfires on March 19, including structure damage in parts of Little Rock.

March also saw volatile fire weather. In Pulaski County and the Little Rock area, dozens of fires broke out during periods of gusty winds and low humidity. Some fires damaged homes and public buildings. In March, the NWS Little Rock monthly summary noted that over 96 wildfires were reported, with red-flag conditions and winds over 50 mph contributing to rapid spread and difficult suppression conditions.

As of early October, Arkansas has also experienced an unusually high number of fire-related fatalities. The Arkansas State Fire Marshal’s Office has reported 50 fire-related deaths so far in 2025—the highest total since 2016.

Climatologically, wildfire risk (“fire weather” days) is trending upward in Arkansas. Studies indicate that hot, dry, and windy conditions supportive of fire behavior have increased in western, central, and southeastern parts of the state.

== List of wildfires ==
The following is a list of fires that burned more than 1,000 acres (400 ha), produced significant structural damage, or resulted in casualties.

Name	County	Acres	Start date	Containment date (Note: Containment means that fire crews have established and secured control lines around the fire's perimeter. These lines are artificial barriers, like trenches or cleared vegetation, designed to stop the fire's spread, or natural barriers like rivers. Containment reflects progress in managing the fire but does not necessarily mean the fire is starved of fuel, under control, or put out.)	Notes/Ref
Blackburn	Crawford	1,169	March 17	March 21	
Neal Creek	Pulaski	1,910	March 17	March 18	

Perimeters of wildfires in Arkansas during 2025 (Red: >1000 acres) (map data)

== See also ==
- 2025 United States wildfires
