= 2025 South Dakota wildfires =

Natural disasters in the USA

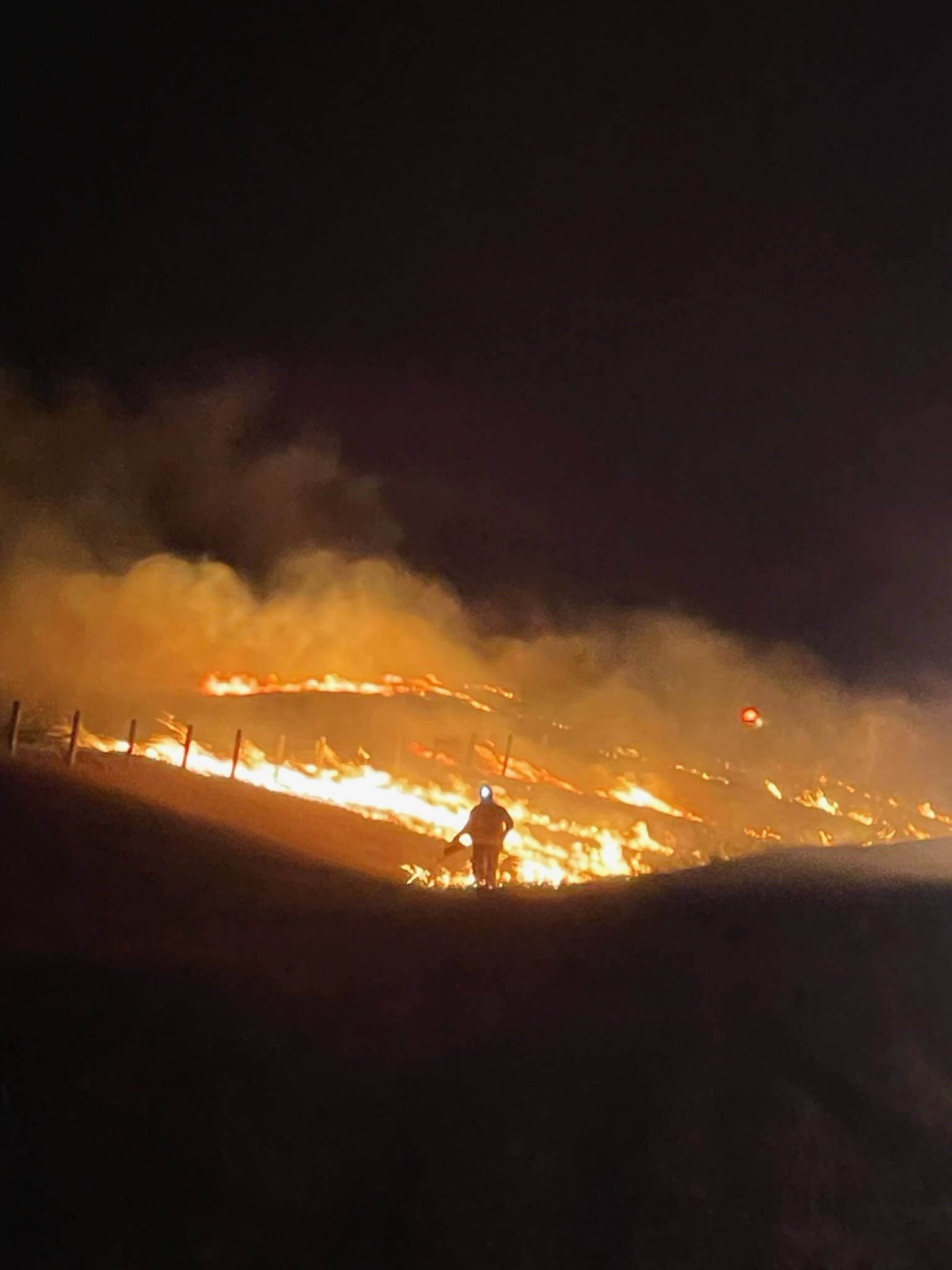
- The Route 13 Fire on March 10

The 2025 South Dakota wildfires were a series of wildfires that burned in the U.S. state of South Dakota.

== Background ==
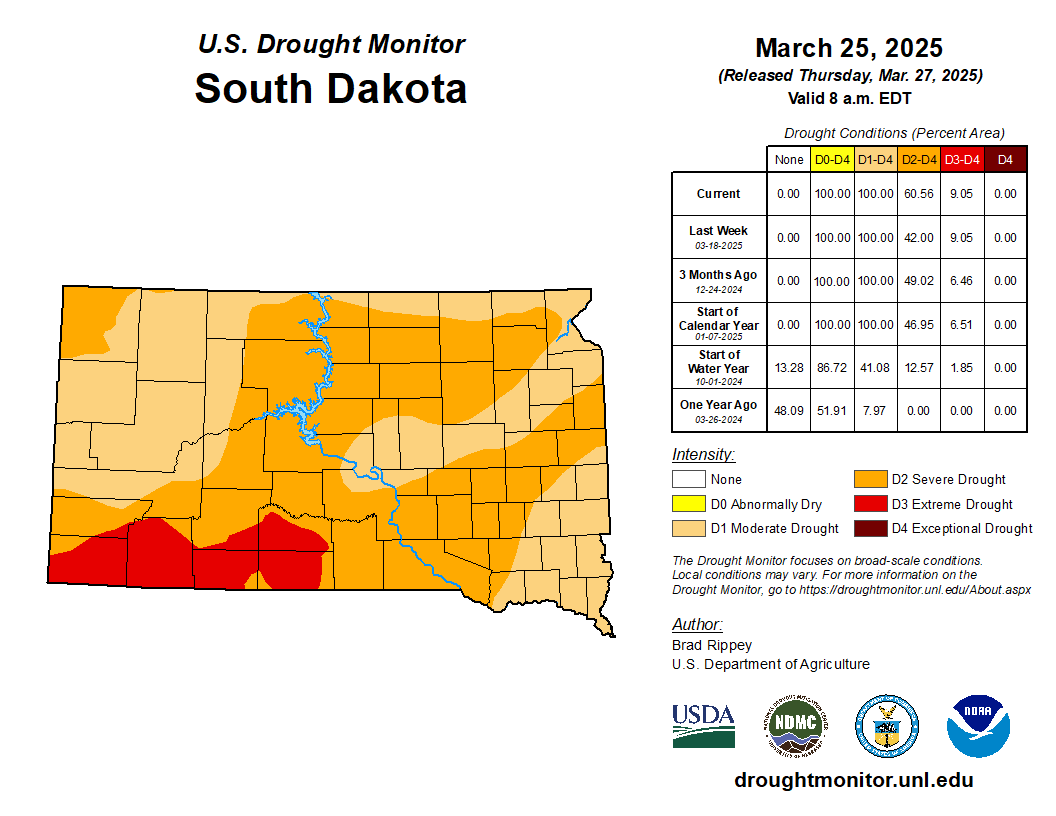
South Dakota Drought Monitor on March 25, 2025

While "fire season" varies every year in South Dakota, most wildfires occur between February and April and June and August. However, there is an increasing fire danger year-round. Fire conditions can be exacerbated by drought, strong winds, and vegetation growth. Climate change is leading to increased temperatures, lower humidity levels, and drought conditions are happening more often. Additionally, warmer temperatures and less precipitation can result in less snowmelt, further contributing to bad wildfire conditions.

== Summary ==
South Dakota’s wildfire season in 2025 has remained relatively moderate so far, with occasional large fires in grassland and tribal-reservation areas.

One of the largest fires this year is the Route 13 Fire in Ziebach County, which burned about 33,928 acres after three individual fires merged. Other significant wildfires include the South Tripp Fire in Tripp County (~1,288 acres) and the War Creek Fire in Jones County (~2,602 acres).

Smoke from regional fires and distant fires (including Canadian wildfires) has periodically affected air quality in parts of eastern South Dakota and the Black Hills region.

In western South Dakota, Red Flag Warnings have been issued under hot, dry, and windy conditions, reminding that fire danger is still present even late in the season.

== List of wildfires ==
The following is a list of fires that burned more than 1,000 acres (400 ha), produced significant structural damage, or resulted in casualties.

Name	County	Acres	Start date	Containment date (Note: Containment means that fire crews have established and secured control lines around the fire's perimeter. These lines are artificial barriers, like trenches or cleared vegetation, designed to stop the fire's spread, or natural barriers like rivers. Containment reflects progress in managing the fire but does not necessarily mean the fire is starved of fuel, under control, or put out.)	Notes	Ref
Route 13	Ziebach	33,928	March 10	March 20	From three fires merging together. Burned about 8 miles (13 km) south of Faith.	
South Tripp	Tripp	2,000	March 14	March 15		
War Creek	Jones	2,602	July 26	July 29	Human-caused. Burned 15 miles (24 km) south of Fort Pierre.	

Perimeters of wildfires in South Dakota during 2025 (Red: >1000 acres) (map data)

== See also ==
- 2025 United States wildfires
