= Jones Road Fire =

2025 wildfire in Ocean County, New Jersey, USA

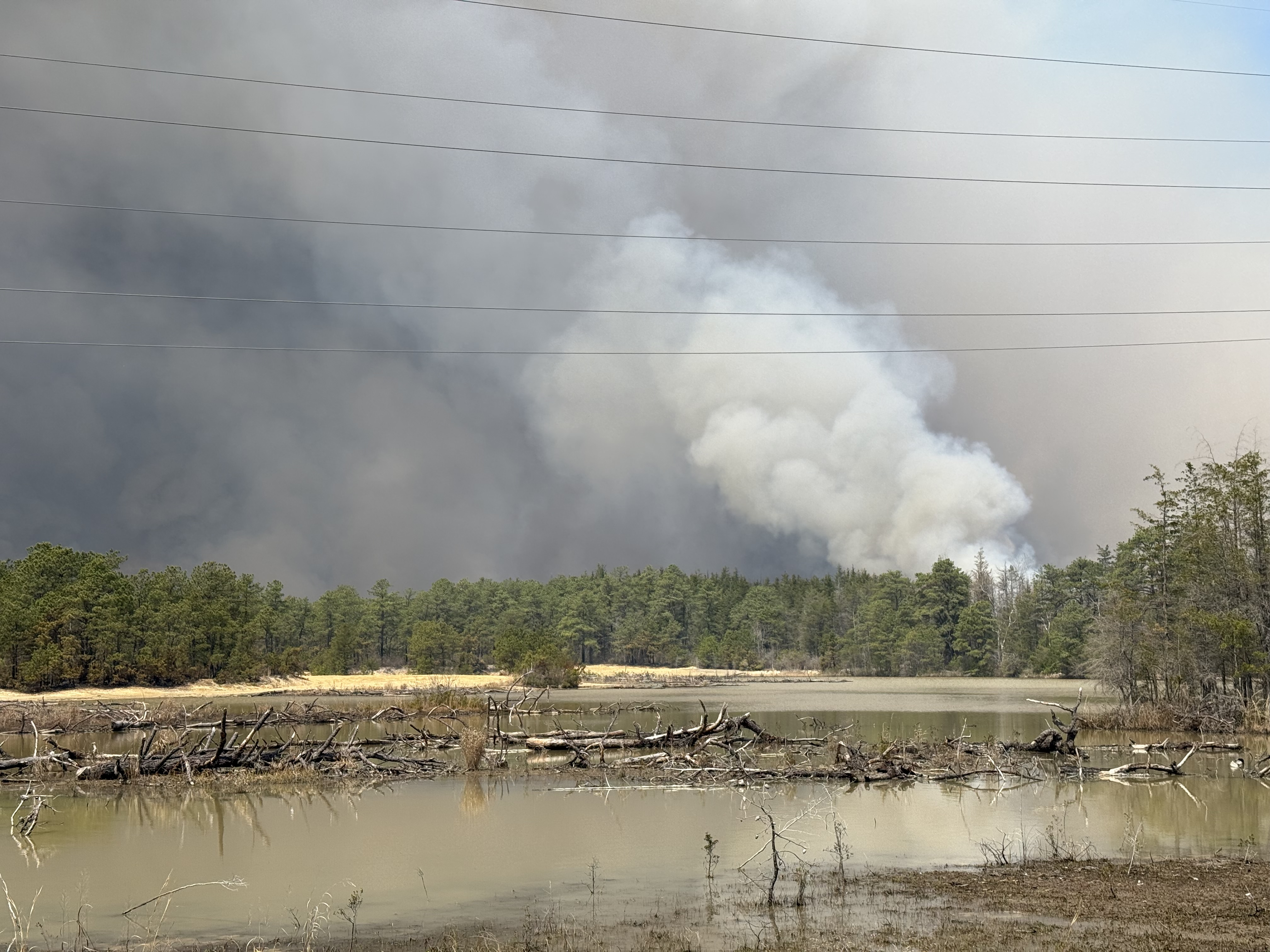
- Smoke plume from the Jones Road Fire on April 23
- Date: April 22, 2025 –; May 12, 2025 (20 days)
- Location: Ocean County, New Jersey, U.S.

Statistics
- Status: Extinguished
- Burned area: 15,300 acres (6,192 ha; 24 sq mi; 62 km^{2})

Impacts
- Injuries: 1 (indirectly)
- Evacuated: 5,000
- Structures destroyed: 1 commercial, multiple outbuildings, 1,320 threatened

Ignition
- Cause: Arson

The Jones Road Fire was a major wildfire that broke out on April 22, 2025, in Barnegat Township, in Ocean County, in the U.S. state of New Jersey, rapidly spreading eastward towards Waretown and Lacey Township. The fire began in the Greenwood Forest Wildlife Management Area, leading to large-scale evacuations, infrastructure disruptions, and significant environmental impact.

== Background ==
The Jones Road Fire burned in the New Jersey Pine Barrens, an environment prone to large and destructive wildfires. Conditions in New Jersey leading up to the fire were in a long-term drought, which helped fuel the fire's spread.

== Cause ==
On April 24, 19-year old Joseph Kling of Waretown was arrested and charged with aggravated arson involving an "improperly extinguished bonfire" and hindering apprehension. Another teenager, a 17-year-old boy, was also arrested in connection with the fire and was charged with aggravated arson and hindering apprehension. The two lied and told police that Mexicans started the fire. In addition, abnormally warm and dry conditions in the days leading up to the fire are said to have contributed to its intensity.

== Effects ==
=== Evacuations and closures ===
Roughly 3,000 residents were evacuated from various communities, including:

- Waretown and Forked River, New Jersey: Mandatory evacuation was ordered for residents east of the Garden State Parkway and near U.S. Route 9, as well as properties along County Route 532.
- Barnegat: Voluntary evacuations occurred in neighborhoods such as Windward, Mirage, Pheasant Run, Heritage Point North, Brookville, and homes along West Bay Avenue.

Emergency shelters were set up, including at Southern Regional High School in Stafford Township, which also accepted pets.

=== Spread and damage ===
By the evening of April 22, the fire had scorched approximately 8,500 acres (3,400 ha), and containment stood at just 10%. It threatened around 1,320 structures, including homes and industrial facilities. Three buildings in Lacey Township's industrial zone sustained damage, with one building completely destroyed.

As of April 23, the fire had officially destroyed one commercial structure with multiple outbuildings and vehicles destroyed. Damage assessments were underway. On the same day, fire officials expected that the fire would continue to grow and become one of the largest wildfires in New Jersey in over 20 years.

=== Smoke ===
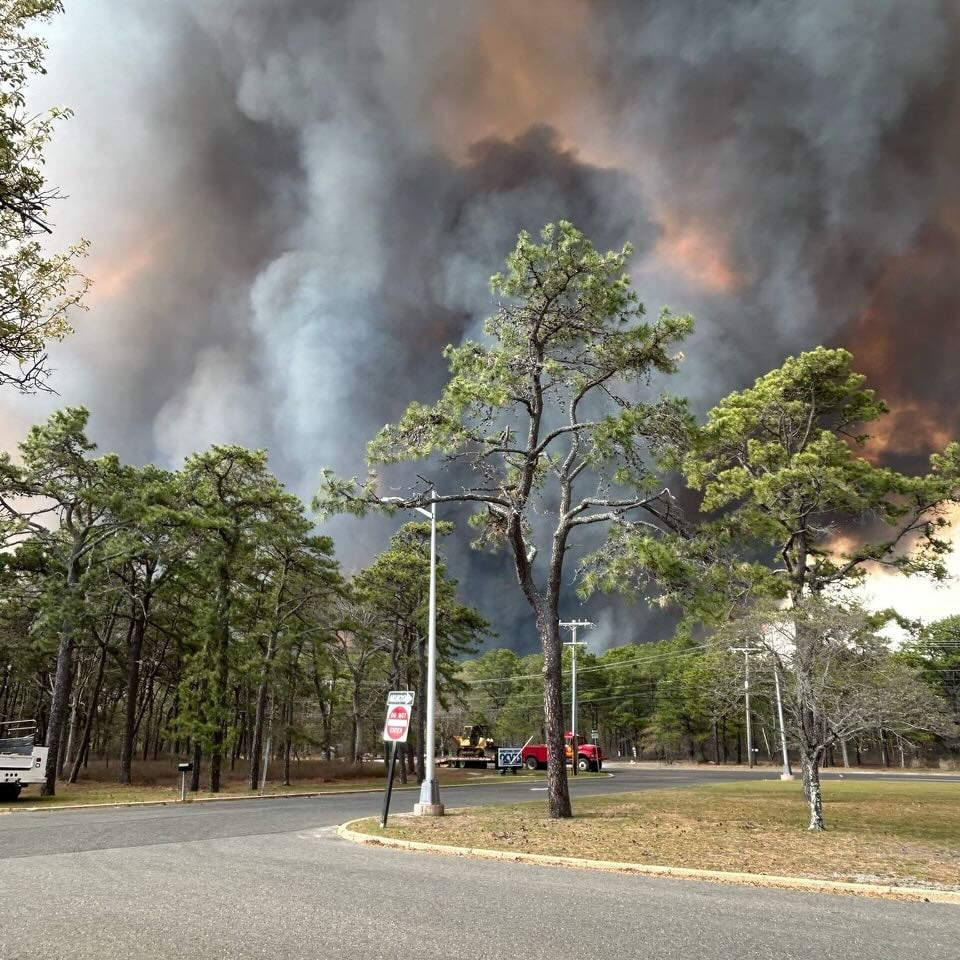
Smoke from the Jones Road Fire

Smoke from the wildfire caused poor air quality in parts of New Jersey, with experts advising residents to keep windows closed and wear a face mask. In New York, worsening air quality was expected by the evening of April 23. The New York State Department of Environmental Conservation stated that air quality may be unhealthy for sensitive groups by April 24.

== Progression ==
The Jones Road Fire started around 1:30 p.m. EST on April 22, 2025. The fire started in the Greenwood Forest Wildlife Management Area near Wells Mills Park.

The fire had quickly grown by 2:08 p.m. to 150 acres (61 ha), with 12 structures threatened at the time, closing down Wells Mills Park. By about 5:07 p.m. the fire had rapidly grown to over 1,200 acres, with structures being evacuated in the area. At 6:45 p.m., the fire was reported to have jumped Route 9.

At 8:10 p.m., the fire was reported to be 3,200 acres (1,300 ha) with 5% containment. Approximately 3,000 residents had been evacuated and 1,320 structures were threatened.

By 10:46 p.m., the fire was reported at 8,500 acres (3,400 ha) with 10% containment, with multiple main roads closed down due to the fire.

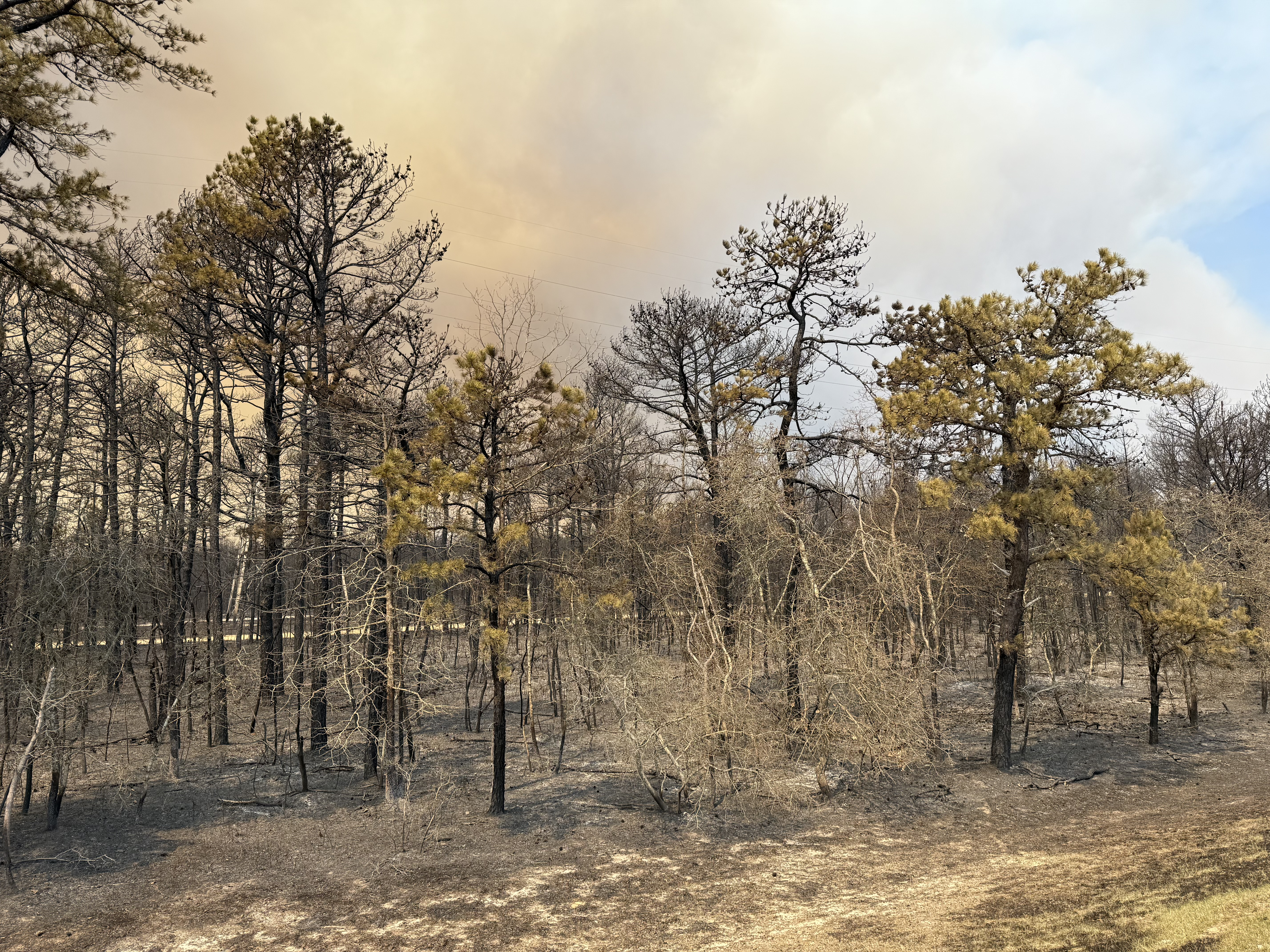
Forest scorched by the Jones Road Fire along the Garden State Parkway in Lacey Township, New Jersey

The next day on April 23, around 8:00 a.m., all evacuations for the approximately 5,000 residents were lifted, and around 7:51 a.m. the fire was estimated at 11,500 acres (4,700 ha) with 30% containment. By the evening, the fire was estimated to be 13,250 acres and 50% contained. On April 24, at 10:20 a.m., the fire was reported to be 15,000 acres (6,100 ha). On April 27, at 12:16 p.m., the fire was estimated to be 15,300 acres (6,200 ha) and 65% contained. The following day, at 2:08 p.m., the fire was stated to be 75% contained.

== See also ==
- Wildfires in the United States during 2025
- New Jersey Forest Fire Service
