= 2025 Nebraska wildfires =

Natural disasters in the USA

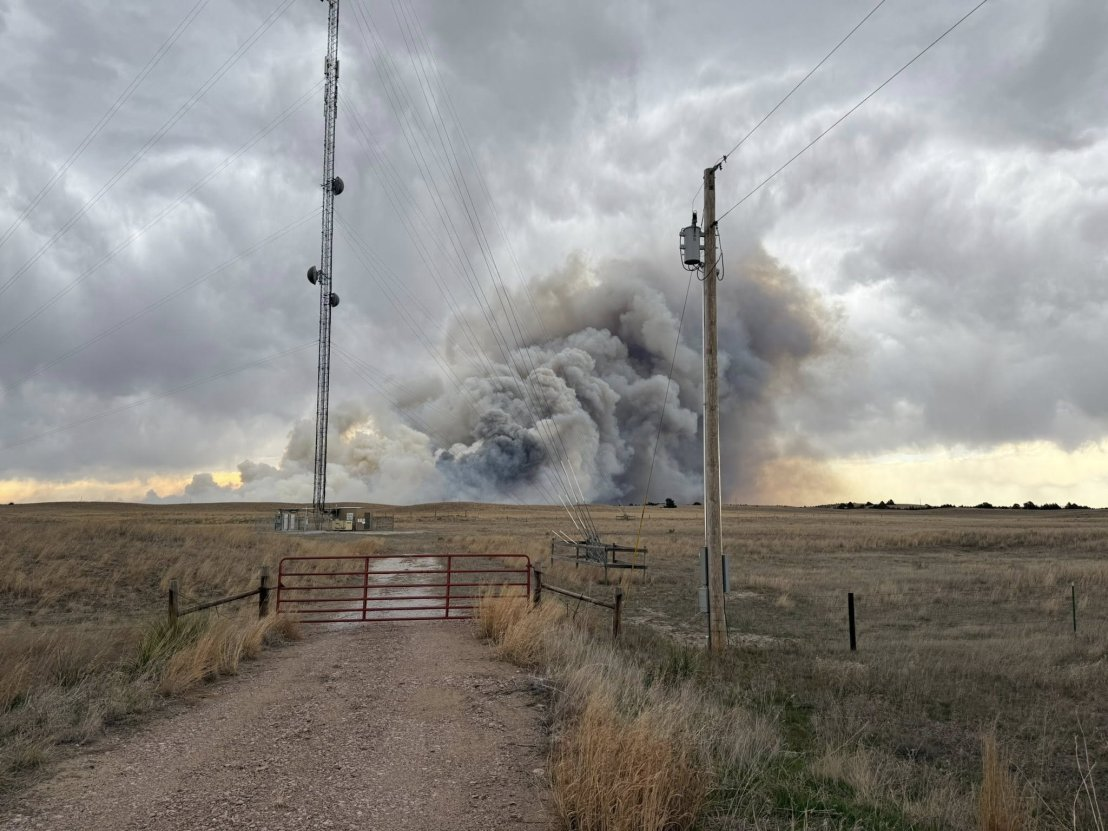
- The Plum Creek Fire near Valentine on April 22, 2025.

Statistics
- Total fires: 234
- Total area: 55,373

The 2025 Nebraska wildfires were a series of wildfires that burned in the U.S. state of Nebraska.

== Background ==
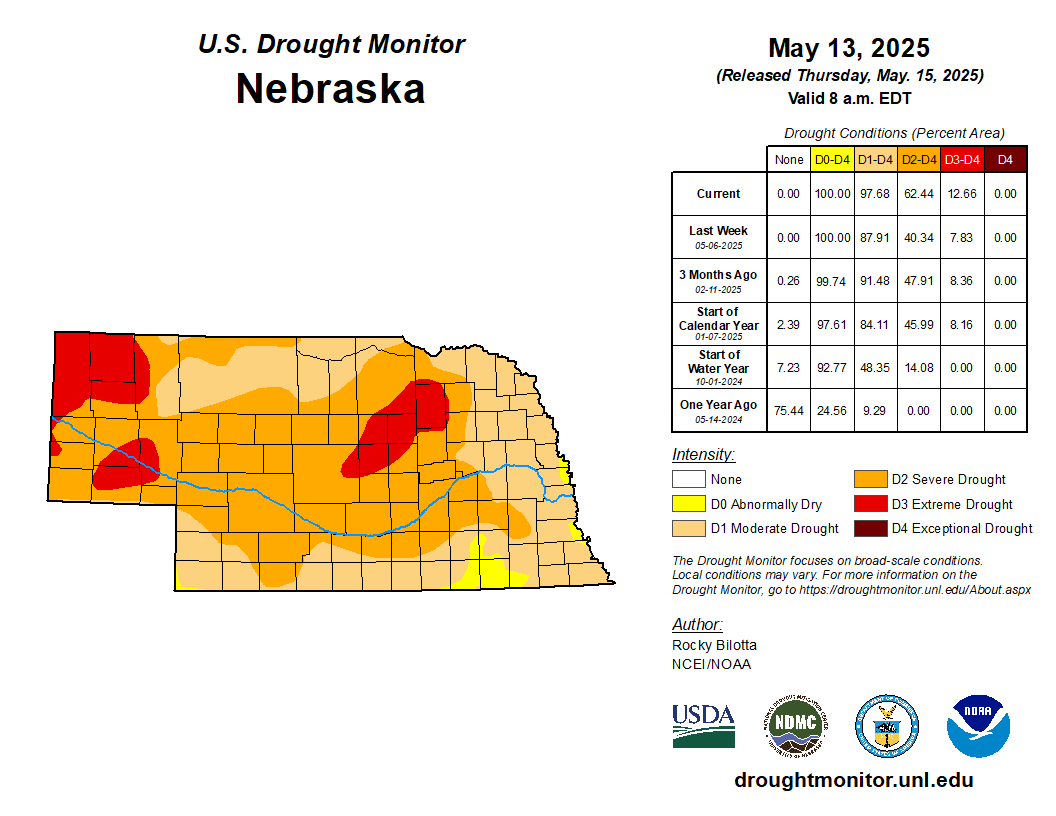
Nebraska Drought Monitor on May 13, 2025

While "fire season" varies every year in Nebraska, most wildfires occur in between February and April. However, there is an increasing fire danger in the late winter months. Fire conditions can be exacerbated by drought, strong winds, and vegetation growth. Climate change is leading to increased temperatures, lower humidity levels, and drought conditions are happening more often. Additionally, warmer temperatures and less precipitation can result in less snowmelt, further contributing to bad wildfire conditions.

== Summary ==
Nebraska’s 2025 wildfire activity has already seen notable early fires, driven by escaped burns, dry fuels, wind, and low moisture.

One of the first major incidents was the Plum Creek Fire in Brown County, which ignited from a prescribed burn that escaped containment. Over 7,000 acres were burned before full containment.

Earlier in the spring, multiple wildfires burned across central Nebraska. Fires such as the East Table Road Fire (≈ 475 acres), Lillian Road Fire (≈ 900 acres), and Eureka Valley Fire (≈ 2,750 acres) have been active. Officials report that around 90 % of these early fires were human-caused, with unmonitored debris burns being a leading contributor.

These fires have generated smoke plumes affecting local air quality, especially in rural and adjacent counties, during days with light winds or inversions.

Geographic and logistical challenges—such as rugged terrain in the Nebraska and limited water infrastructure—have complicated suppression efforts, especially in remote zones.

== List of wildfires ==
The following is a list of fires that burned more than 1,000 acres (400 ha), produced significant structural damage, or resulted in casualties.

Name	County	Acres	Start date	Containment date (Note: Containment means that fire crews have established and secured control lines around the fire's perimeter. These lines are artificial barriers, like trenches or cleared vegetation, designed to stop the fire's spread, or natural barriers like rivers. Containment reflects progress in managing the fire but does not necessarily mean the fire is starved of fuel, under control, or put out.)	Notes	Ref.
Eureka Valley	Custer	4,800	February 25	March 4		
Dismal River Ranch	McPherson, Hooker	50,000	February 25	February 28		
N Maxwell Road	Lincoln	8,800	March 26	March 28		
Dads Lake	Cherry	18,552	March 28	March 29		
Plum Creek	Brown	7,075	April 21	April 30	Started as a prescribed burn but escaped due to high winds.	
Boyd	Garden	1,250	September 9	September 15	Lightning-caused. Burned in Crescent Lake National Wildlife Refuge.	

Perimeters of wildfires in Nebraska during 2025 (Red: >1000 acres) (map data)

== See also ==
- 2025 United States wildfires
