= 2025 North Carolina wildfires =

Natural disasters in the USA

The 2025 North Carolina wildfires were a series of wildfires that burned in North Carolina.

== Background ==
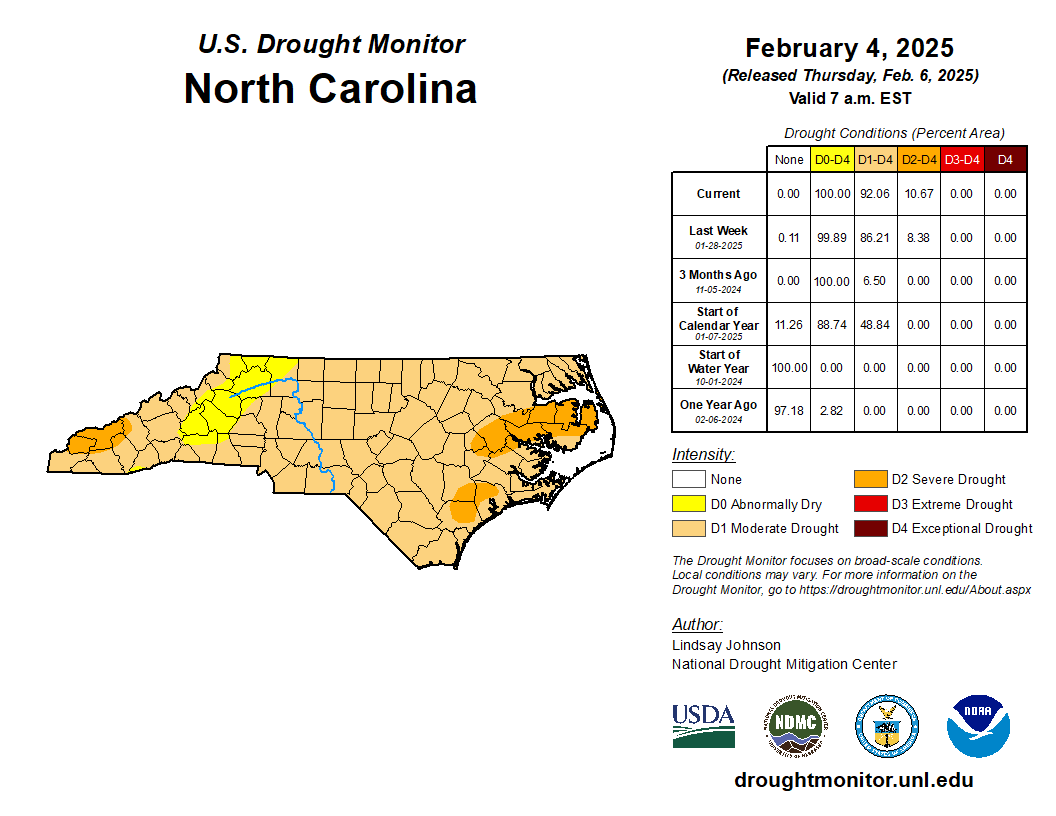
North Carolina Drought Monitor on February 4, 2025

=== Spring wildfire season ===
As temperatures rise between mid-March and mid-April, surface fuels dry out more easily. Pre-green-up vegetation and occasional gusty winds create conditions favorable for ignition—even from lightning or human activity. Scattered convective rainfall contributes to unpredictable dry pockets that increase fire risk.

=== Fall wildfire season ===
In late September through October, temperatures remain warm and humidity drops. Once leaves fall, the forest floor accumulates flammable debris, and cool-season frontal winds can trigger rapid fire spread. Fall fires are generally less frequent than spring fires but can escalate under dry or windy conditions.

=== Role of storm debris and climate trends ===
Hurricane aftermath—particularly debris left behind—has compounded fire danger. In 2025, Hurricane Helene’s downed trees and low humidity contributed to multiple early-season fires, including the Black Cove Fire near Asheville. Hundreds of wildfires were ignited, underscoring increased risk due to debris accumulation and development in fire-prone areas.

=== Annual fire statistics ===
Since the late 20th century, North Carolina has averaged over 5,000 wildfires annually, with recent years like 2023 recording 5,101 fires burning nearly 18,748 acres.

=== Human causes and public safety response ===
The leading cause of wildfires in North Carolina is careless debris burning, accounting for nearly all incidents. As fall fire season approaches, the North Carolina Forest Service emphasizes caution when burning yard debris and provides public fire-safety guidance and programs like Firewise USA.

== Summary ==
North Carolina’s 2025 wildfire season has seen significant activity, especially in the western mountain region, spurred in part by lingering storm debris and unusually dry conditions. In early spring, multiple fires ignited across Polk and Henderson counties—among them the Black Cove, Deep Woods, and Fish Hook fires. These fires collectively burned several thousand acres before being fully contained.

By late April, the scale of fires and the number of ignitions prompted Governor Josh Stein to extend a State of Emergency across 34 counties in western North Carolina.

Dry fuels, steep mountainous terrain, and scattered blowdown from Hurricane Helene have complicated suppression efforts and increased fire risk.

Smoke from these fires triggered air quality alerts in adjacent counties, especially during inversion days and low wind events. Evacuations were ordered in several rural and mountain neighborhoods.

== List of wildfires ==
The following is a list of fires that burned more than 1,000 acres (400 ha), produced significant structural damage, or resulted in casualties.

| Name | County | Acres | Start date | Containment date (Note: Containment means that fire crews have established and secured control lines around the fire's perimeter. These lines are artificial barriers, like trenches or cleared vegetation, designed to stop the fire's spread, or natural barriers like rivers. Containment reflects progress in managing the fire but does not necessarily mean the fire is starved of fuel, under control, or put out.) | Notes/Ref. |
|---|---|---|---|---|---|
| Black Cove | Polk | 3,502 | March 19 | April 10 | |
| Deep Woods | Polk | 3,969 | March 19 | April 10 | 2 residences reported to be destroyed. |
| Alarka #5 | Swain | 1,575 | March 25 | April 8 | |
| Rattlesnake Branch | Haywood | 1,858 | March 26 | April 10 | |
| Haoe Lead | Graham | 3,103 | April 12 | May 5 | |
| Bee Rock Creek | McDowell | 2,085 | April 15 | April 24 | |
| Sunset Road | Brunswick | 1,331 | May 2 | June 16 | |

Perimeters of wildfires in North Carolina during 2025 (Red: >1000 acres) (map data)

== See also ==
- 2025 United States wildfires
