= 2025 Alaska wildfires =

Natural disasters in the USA

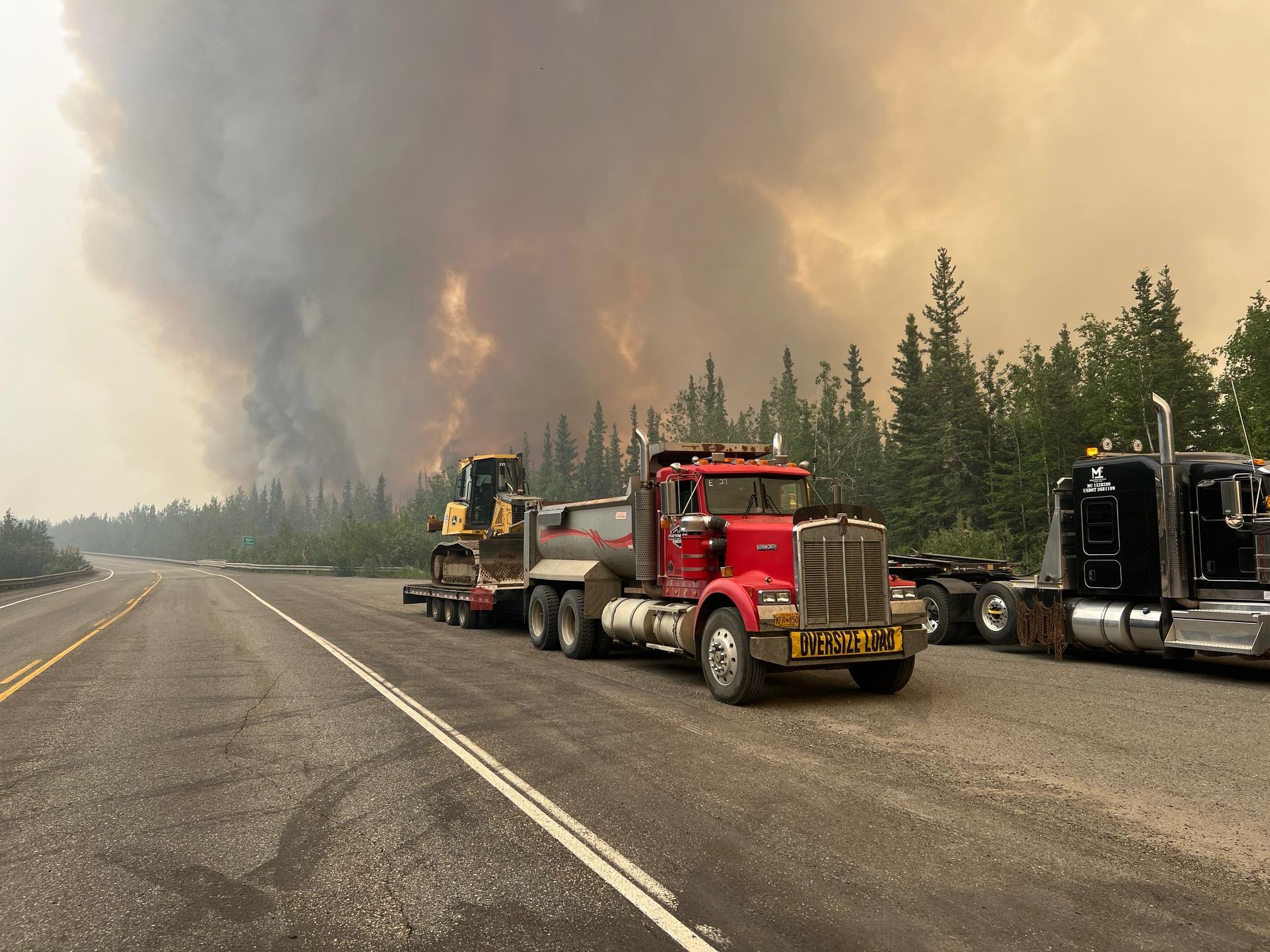
- Bear Creek Fire from Park Highway on June 21, 2025.

The 2025 Alaska wildfires were a series of wildfires that burned across Alaska during the 2025 fire season. By mid-September, the season had burned an estimated 1.68 million acres, roughly double the 10-year average for the state.

== Background ==
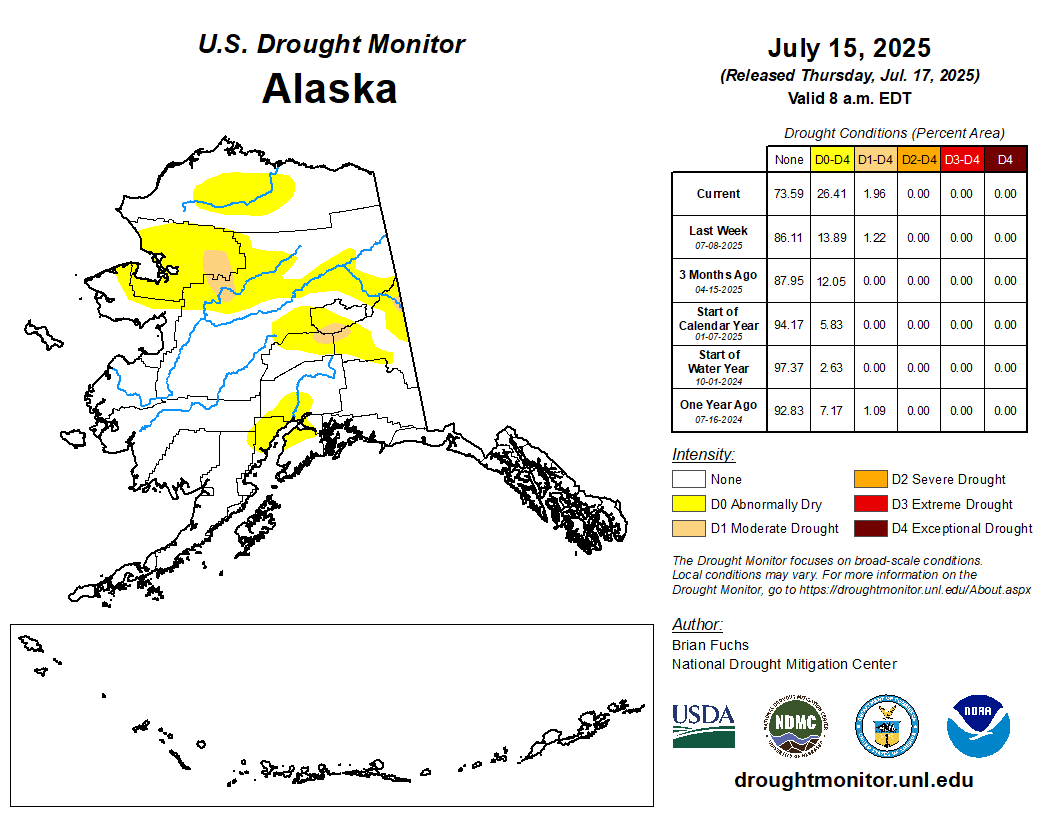
Alaska Drought Monitor on July 15, 2025

"Fire season" in Alaska now starts on April 1, one month earlier than historically. Large fires typically start in late May and are contained by late July. The Interior has four distinct wildfire stages. The first occurs soon after snowmelt from dry grass ignited by humans and spread by wind. The peak of fire season occurs around the summer solstice when long, warm daylight hours dry out plant litter that is ignited by lightning. In late July, high temperatures and drought extend fire season. In autumn, fire activity tends to slow down due to cooling temperatures and shorter day length. However, fire managers have been challenged in recent decades due to variability in season conditions. Most wildfires burn in the Interior boreal forest between the Brooks Range and Alaska Range.

== List of wildfires ==
The following is a list of fires that burned more than 1,000 acres (400 ha), produced significant structural damage, or resulted in casualties.

Name	County	Acres	Start date	Containment date (Note: Containment means that fire crews have established and secured control lines around the fire's perimeter. These lines are artificial barriers, like trenches or cleared vegetation, designed to stop the fire's spread, or natural barriers like rivers. Containment reflects progress in managing the fire but does not necessarily mean the fire is starved of fuel, under control, or put out.)	Notes/References
Kathul	Southeast Fairbanks	1,008	May 25	June 11	
Oskawalik	Bethel	1,779	June 14	July 6	
Caribou	Yukon-Koyukuk	1,936	June 15	August 2	Caused by lightning.
Hogatza	Yukon-Koyukuk	29,280	June 16	August 8	Caused by lightning.
Kawichiark 1	Northwest Arctic	4,626	June 16	August 10	Caused by lightning.
Kawichiark 2	Northwest Arctic	2,670	June 16	August 10	Caused by lightning.
Telidaside	Yukon-Koyukuk	1,733	June 16	July 2	
Chicken	Yukon-Koyukuk	8,071	June 16	August 11	Caused by lightning.
Tetilesook	Northwest Arctic	1,282	June 16	August 10	Caused by lightning.
Tagagawik	Yukon-Koyukuk	1,378	June 17	July 8	Caused by lightning.
Wolf	Yukon-Koyukuk	2,021	June 17	August 10	Caused by lightning.
Obrien	Yukon-Koyukuk	7,642	June 17	August 14, 2025	Caused by lightning.
HelpMeJack	Yukon-Koyukuk	3,172	June 17	August 14	Caused by lightning.
Chabanika	Yukon-Koyukuk	4,131	June 17	August 8	Caused by lightning.
Kalusuk	Northwest Arctic	1,062	June 17	July 8	Caused by lightning.
Klikhtentotzna	Yukon-Koyukuk	117,908	June 17	August 18	Caused by lightning.
Kandik	Southeast Fairbanks	5,327	June 18	August 14	Caused by lightning.
Meadow Creek	Yukon-Koyukuk	19,634	June 18	July 29	Caused by lightning.
Kechumstuk Creek	Southeast Fairbanks	12,604	June 18	August 8	Caused by lightning.
Boulder Creek	Fairbanks North Star	4,056	June 18	August 7	Caused by lightning.
Orum	Yukon-Koyukuk	5,647	June 18	August 16	Caused by lightning.
Lush	Yukon-Koyukuk	26,686	June 18	Unknown	
Williams	Yukon-Koyukuk	1,180	June 18	July 11	Caused by lightning.
Aniralik	Northwest Arctic	4,930	June 19	July 31	Caused by lightning.
Twelvemile Lake	Southeast Fairbanks	24,145	June 19	September 18	Caused by lightning.
Ricks Creek	Fairbanks North Star	16,848	June 19	August 7	Caused by lightning.
Ninetyeight	Fairbanks North Star	16,190	June 19	Unknown	Caused by lightning.
Himalaya Road	Fairbanks North Star	6,056	June 19	Unknown	Caused by lightning.
Bear Creek	Denali	30,988	June 19	Unknown	Caused by lightning. 34 reported residences destroyed.
Moran	Yukon-Koyukuk	13,819	June 19	August 17	
Bonnifield Creek	Denali	17,337	June 19	August 14	Caused by lightning.
Bonanza Creek	Fairbanks North Star	12,576	June 19	Unknown	Caused by lightning.
Nelchina Glacier	Matanuska-Susitna	3,920	June 19	Unknown	
7 Mile Lookout	Southeast Fairbanks	4,094	June 19	Unknown	Caused by lightning.
Susulatna	Yukon-Koyukuk	3,031	June 19	July 29	Caused by lightning.
Nowitna	Yukon-Koyukuk	2,613	June 19	August 16	Caused by lightning.
Elephant	Yukon-Koyukuk	9,064	June 19	Unknown	Caused by lightning.
Red	Yukon-Koyukuk	14,525	June 19	August 16	Caused by lightning.
Ikheenjik	Yukon-Koyukuk	19,650	June 20	August 20	
Turtle	Yukon-Koyukuk	16,337	June 20	August 20	
Moldy	Yukon-Koyukuk	72,216	June 20	Unknown	Caused by lightning.
McArthur Creek	Southeast Fairbanks	7,148	June 20	August 8	Caused by lightning.
Ridgeline	Southeast Fairbanks	4,755	June 20	August 6	
River Trail	Southeast Fairbanks	23,827	June 20	August 16	Caused by lightning.
Porphyry	Southeast Fairbanks	5,101	June 20	August 13	Caused by lightning.
Takoma	Yukon-Koyukuk	19,889	June 20	August 20	Caused by lightning.
Birch	Yukon-Koyukuk	4,981	June 20	Unknown	Caused by lightning.
Goldstream Creek	Yukon-Koyukuk	20,470	June 20	Unknown	
Saint George Creek	Denali	29,210	June 20	August 14	Caused by lightning. Three reported residences destroyed.
Fish Lake	Copper River	1,841	June 20	August 7	Caused by lightning.
Buckley Bar	Yukon-Koyukuk	9,658	June 20	August 14	Caused by lightning.
Dry Creek	Denali	13,268	June 20	August 14	Caused by lightning.
Aggie Creek	Fairbanks North Star	34,837	June 20	Unknown	Caused by lightning.
Live Trap	Denali	2,503	June 20	July 22	Caused by lightning.
Christian	Yukon-Koyukuk	64,065	June 20	August 20	Caused by lightning.
Michigan	Yukon-Koyukuk	1,533	June 20	July 22	Caused by lightning.
Salmon Trout	Yukon-Koyukuk	1,303	June 20	August 20	Caused by lightning.
Susulatna Hills	Yukon-Koyukuk	8,711	June 20	July 29	Caused by lightning.
Pilot Creek	Yukon-Koyukuk	3,694	June 20	Unknown	Caused by lightning.
Sand Lake	Southeast Fairbanks	6,353	June 21	Unknown	
Yellow	Yukon-Koyukuk	7,942	June 21	August 21	Caused by lightning.
Kerulu	Northwest Arctic	1,689	June 21	August 8	Caused by lightning.
Ikpikpuk	North Slope	1,995	June 22	July 8	Caused by lightning.
Monte Cristo Creek	Fairbanks North Star	8,772	June 22	August 11	Caused by lightning.
Three Castle	Southeast Fairbanks	2,134	June 23	August 22	Caused by lightning.
Runt	Yukon-Koyukuk	16,018	June 23	August 23	Caused by lightning.
Mauneluk	Northwest Arctic	3,017	June 25	August 23	Caused by lightning.
Tsukon	Yukon-Koyukuk	1,483	July 4	August 23	Caused by lightning.
Wheeler	Yukon-Koyukuk	39,209	July 7	September 10	Caused by lightning.
Portage	Yukon-Koyukuk	2,900	July 7	July 22	Caused by lightning.
Kaliguricheark	Northwest Arctic	11,493	July 7	August 19	Caused by lightning.
Nuna	Northwest Arctic	15,018	July 7	August 19	Caused by lightning.
Reed	Northwest Arctic	3,395	July 9	August 25	Caused by lightning.

Perimeters of wildfires in Alaska during 2025 (Red: >1000 acres) (map data)

== See also ==
- 2025 United States wildfires
