= 2025 Nevada wildfires =

Natural disasters in the USA

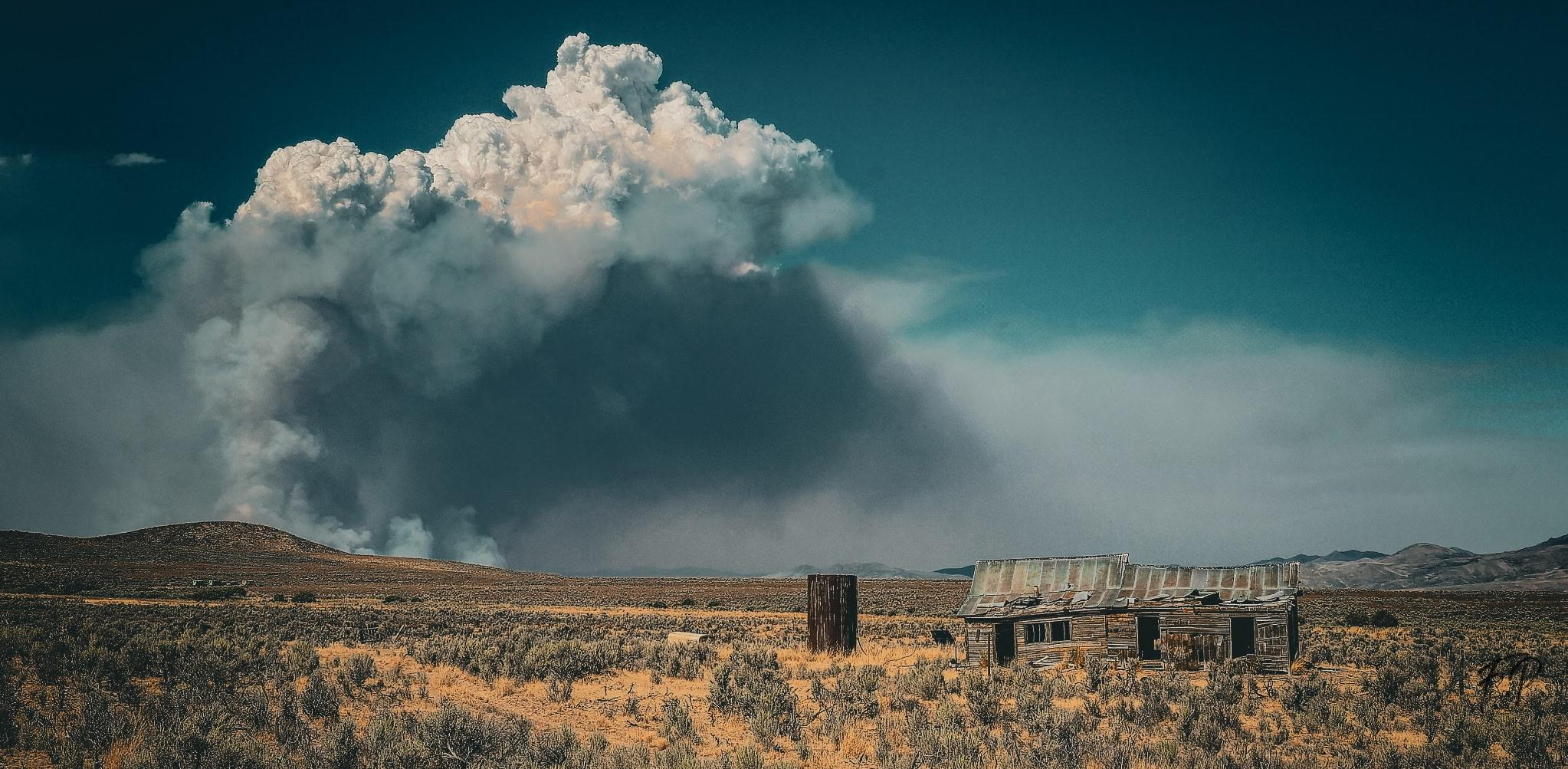
- Smoke cloud from the Cottonwood Peak Fire on August 19

Statistics
- Total fires: 690
- Total area: 395,265 acres (159,958 ha; 1,599.58 km^{2}; 617.602 sq mi)

Impacts
- Injuries: 1 firefighter

Map
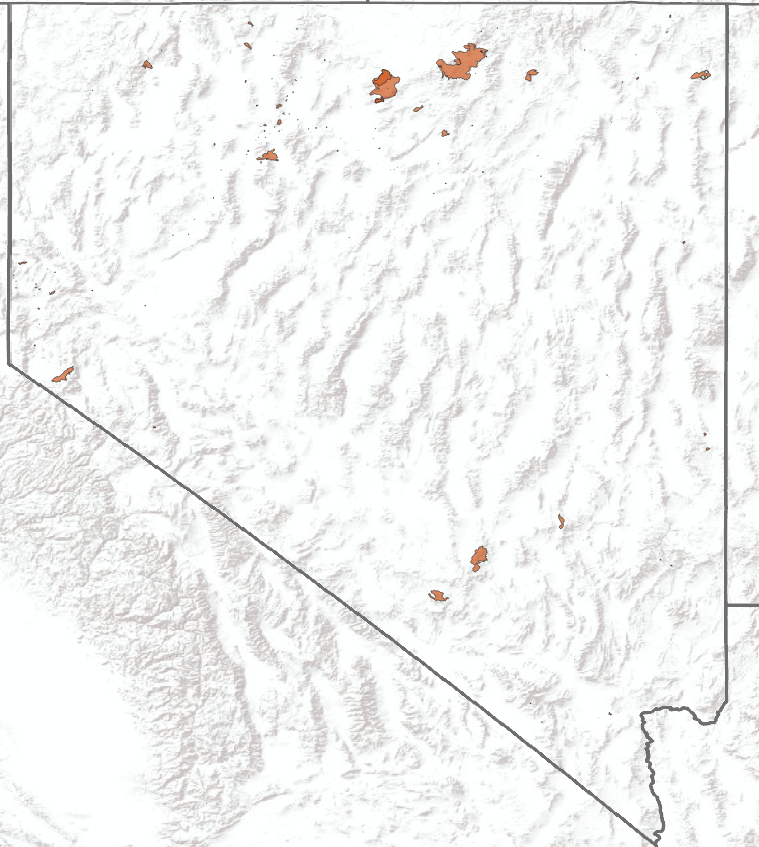
- Physical map of 2025 Nevada wildfires

A series of wildfires burned in the U.S. state of Nevada during 2025.

== Background ==
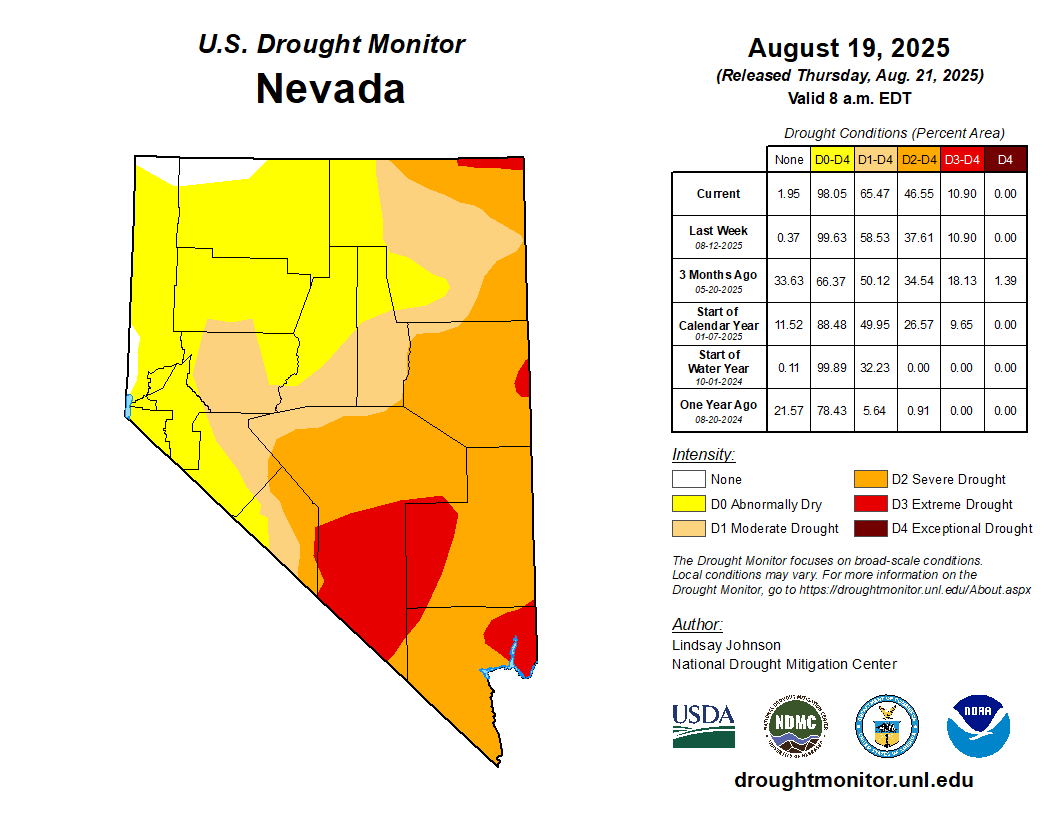
Nevada Drought Monitor on August 19, 2025

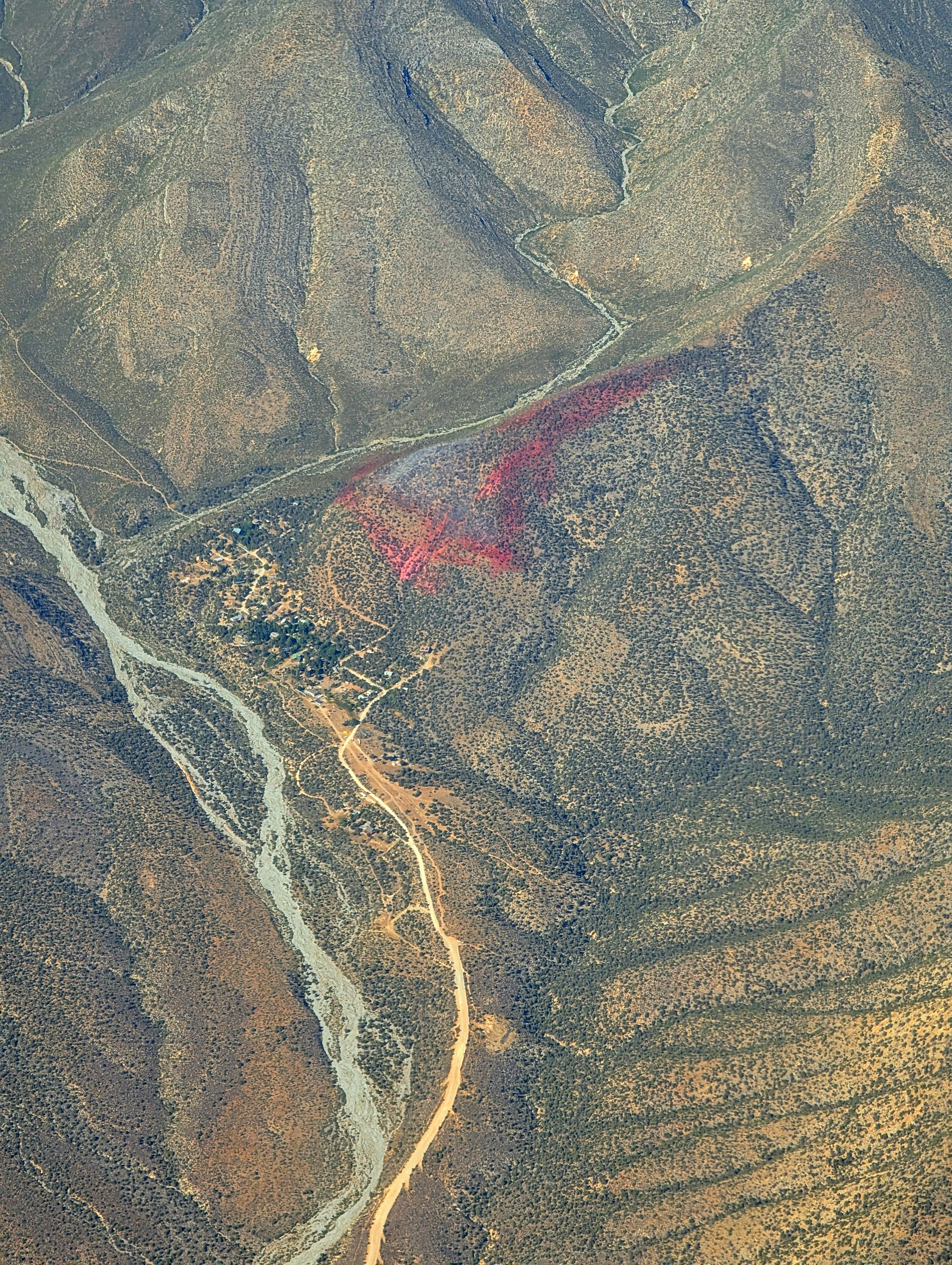
Air-dropped stripes of red fire retardant helped keep the Trout Canyon fire (July 6 and 7 between Pahrump and Las Vegas) to just 30 acres.

The typical "fire season" in Nevada lasts from May to October, the time when vegetation is the driest. However, the timing varies every year based on a number of other factors, including if there is hot, dry weather, the amount of dry vegetation, and when there are more natural causes possible, such as lightning. The peak time of the season is also determined by these factors.

== Summary ==
In mid-June, the Nevada State Forester and Fire Warden had a "cautious" prediction for wildfire season. There were abnormally dry conditions for the month, mostly from less snowpack in lower elevations and a warm spring melting snowpack at higher elevations, and drought conditions set in early. Over half the state was already under drought, compared to just 1% last year. By June 4, there had already been about 150 wildfire reports that burned 600 acres (240 ha), already half of the average calls a year. A large crop of cheatgrass from 2024, an invasive and highly flammable weed, was never tamped down and a second crop is growing. This will cause a heightened risk for Western and Southern Nevada. Forecasts predict fire activity will slow in mid-July during monsoon season. Continuing into the season, the heavy load of cheatgrass continued into the summer and fall months, particularly in Humboldt and Elko counties, where the largest wildfires of the season have been located.

While fighting the Conner Fire on June 20 in Douglas County, firefighter Riley Fraizer working for the Bureau of Land Management received second-degree burns to his hands, wrist, and face. Erratic winds led to increased fire activity when his engine crew was assigned to keep the fire from spreading past a mountain road. Fraizer has been unable to work for the rest of 2025 from the injuries.

On the evening of July 3, dry lightning cells that moved across Northern Nevada ignited several wildfires in the Winnemucca area, including the Bloody and Barber Fires, along with several smaller ones. All the fires grew rapidly amid favorable conditions. They prompted evacuations and threatened infrastructure in Pershing and Humboldt counties.

In early August, lightning moved through Elko County, igniting several large wildfires. The fires (including the Snowstorm, Jakes, MP 22, and Adobe Mountain fires) have been fueled by dry conditions and rugged terrain. Every BLM district in Nevada and in Twin Falls and Boise, Idaho were sent to respond. Due to limited access to the wildfires, crews are utilizing air support and bulldozers when conditions permit. The Snowstorm and Jakes Fires merged into the collective Jakes Fire on August 4.

The heavy fuel carryover lasted until the early fall months, with a regular fuel level possibly leading to wildfires until early winter, and drought conditions remained throughout the Great Basin throughout fall. Thunderstorms have been ignited most of the wildfires in the state, including a smaller batch of incidents in late September and early October.

== List of wildfires ==
The following is a list of fires that burned more than 1,000 acres (400 ha), or produced significant structural damage or casualties.

Name	County	Acres	Start date	Containment date (Note: Containment means that fire crews have established and secured control lines around the fire's perimeter. These lines are artificial barriers, like trenches or cleared vegetation, designed to stop the fire's spread, or natural barriers like rivers. Containment reflects progress in managing the fire but does not necessarily mean the fire is starved of fuel, under control, or put out.)	Notes	Ref
Burnt Canyon	Lincoln	1,068	June 11	June 19	Lightning-caused. Burned about 65 miles (105 km) southeast of Ely.	
Winnemucca Mountain	Humboldt	2,321	June 15	June 18	Cause under investigation. Burned just northwest of Winnemucca.	
Conner	Douglas	17,714	June 20	June 30	Undetermined cause. Burned in the Pinenut Range about 8 miles (13 km) southeast of Gardnerville in the Monarch and Numbers Fire burn areas. Two residential structures and one outbuilding destroyed. Injured one firefighter.	
Mount Irish	Lincoln	6,315	June 30	July 17	Human-caused. Burned about 20 miles (32 km) northwest of Alamo.	
Bloody	Humboldt	1,856	July 3	July 4	Lightning-caused. Burned just north of Winnemucca and threatening community infrastructure.	
Barber	Pershing	17,583	July 3	July 11	Lightning-caused. Burned south of Winnemucca and led to evacuations near Pershing/Humboldt county border and Imlay.	
Sheep Creek Canyon	Eureka	4,174	July 4	July 7	Undetermined cause. Burned 33 miles (53 km) east of Battle Mountain.	
Bartlett	Humboldt	6,169	July 4	July 10	Lightning-caused. Burned near Denio.	
Hot Canyon	Elko	12,794	July 8	July 22	Lightning-caused. Burned 10 miles (16 km) northwest of Montello.	
Gothic	Nye	35,161	July 6	August 21	Lightning-caused. Burned 25 miles (40 km) southwest of Rachel.	
Cornucopia	Elko	3,514	July 15	July 18	Lightning-caused. Burned 16 miles (26 km) north of Tuscarora.	
Gold	Washoe	1,268	July 20	July 26	Human-caused. Burned in Sparks outside of Golden Eagle Regional Park. Driven by wind and terrain.	
Cat Canyon	Nye	16,260	July 20	August 21	Lightning-caused. Burned 20 miles (32 km) northeast of Beatty in Nevada Test and Training Range.	
Moonshine	Humboldt	2,863	July 29	August 2	Lightning-caused. Burned on BLM lands.	
Jakes	Elko	82,217	August 1	August 16	Lightning-caused. Burned 2 miles (3.2 km) southwest of Midas and merged with the Snowstorm Fire.	
MP 22	Elko	4,230	August 1	August 5	Lightning-caused. Burned 6 miles (9.7 km) southwest of Midas.	
Adobe Mountain	Elko	10,668	August 2	August 11	Lightning-caused. Burned 38 miles (61 km) north of Elko.	
Rancho	Washoe	1,483	August 14	August 20	Human-caused. Burned north of Cold Springs and prompted evacuations.	
Cottonwood Peak	Elko	132,604	August 15	November 21	Lightning-caused. Burned 3 miles (4.8 km) north of Tuscarora and officials asked residents in Independence Valley to prepare to evacuate.	
Big Butte	Elko	3,612	August 24	August 26	Unknown cause. Burned 35 miles (56 km) northeast of Battle Mountain.	
R-14 Buffalo	Washoe	1,286	August 29	September 6	Undetermined cause. Burned 18 miles (29 km) west of Gerlach.	
Sentinel	Humboldt	1,247	September 3	September 8	Lightning-caused. Burned 18 miles (29 km) southwest of McDermitt.	

Perimeters of 2025 Nevada wildfires (map data)

== See also ==
- 2025 United States wildfires
