= Winnemucca Mountain =

Mountain in Nevada, United States

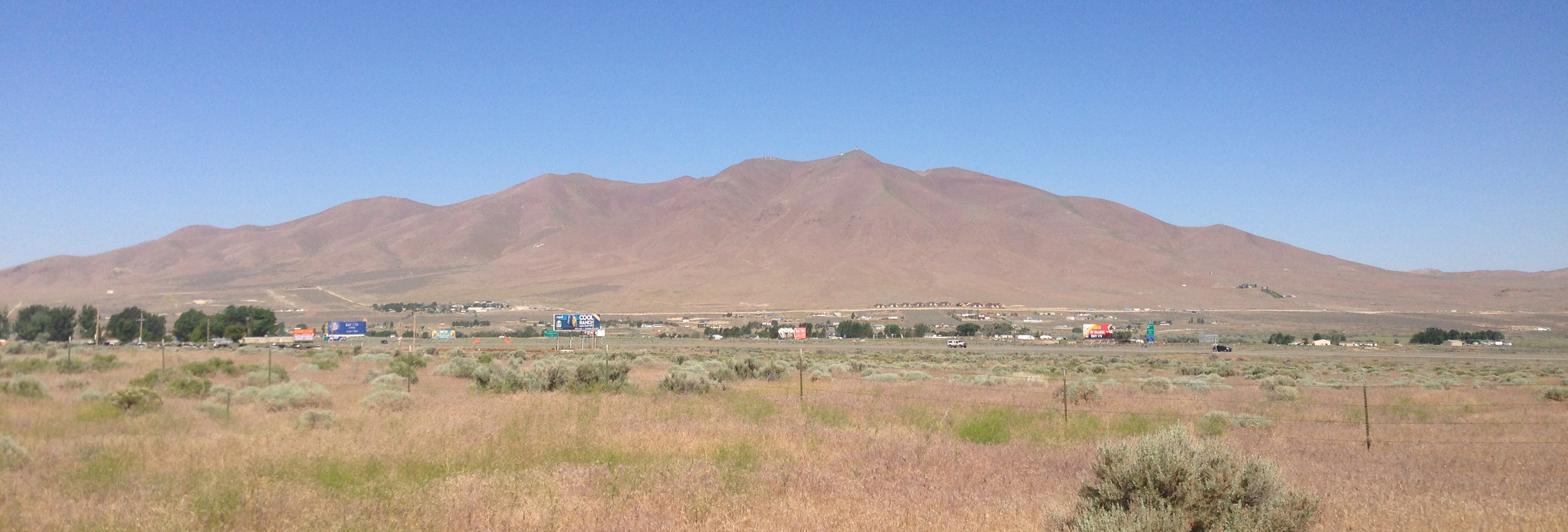
- View towards Winnemucca Mountain from Nevada State Route 794 in Winnemucca

Highest point
- Elevation: 6742+ ft (2055+ m)
- Prominence: 1,919 ft (585 m)
- Coordinates: 41°00′39″N 117°46′03″W

Geography
- Location within Nevada
- Location: Humboldt County, Nevada, U.S.
- Parent range: Santa Rosa Range

Winnemucca Mountain is a mountain near the small city of Winnemucca in Humboldt County, Nevada, United States. It is considered to be the southernmost named summit of the Santa Rosa Range. A paved road ascends to radio facilities on the summit.

On June 15, 2025, a human-caused wildfire burned on Winnemucca Mountain, which burned 2,321 acres (939 ha) and affected one structure.

== Gallery ==
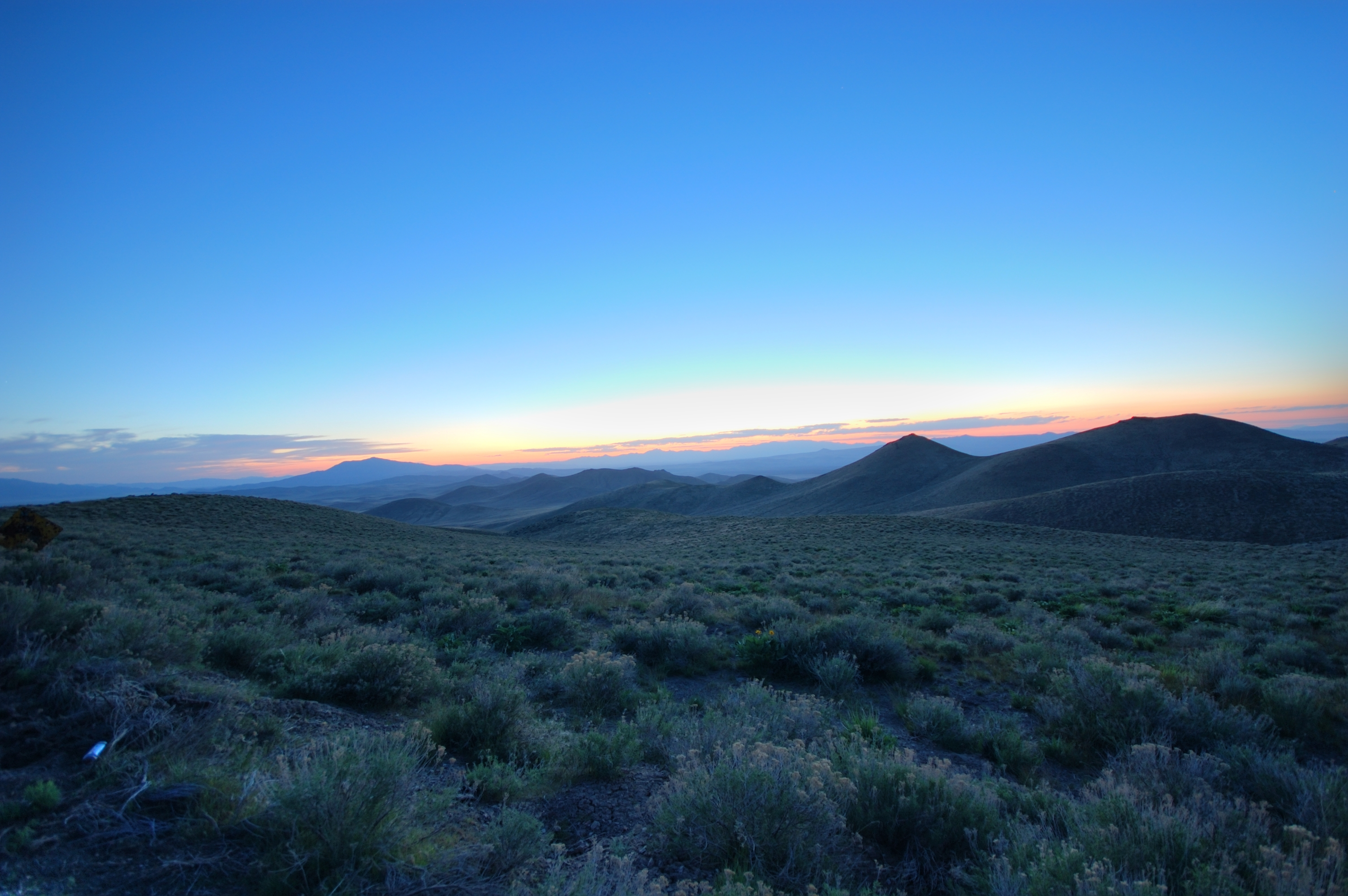
Sunset from the Winnemucca Mountain Road

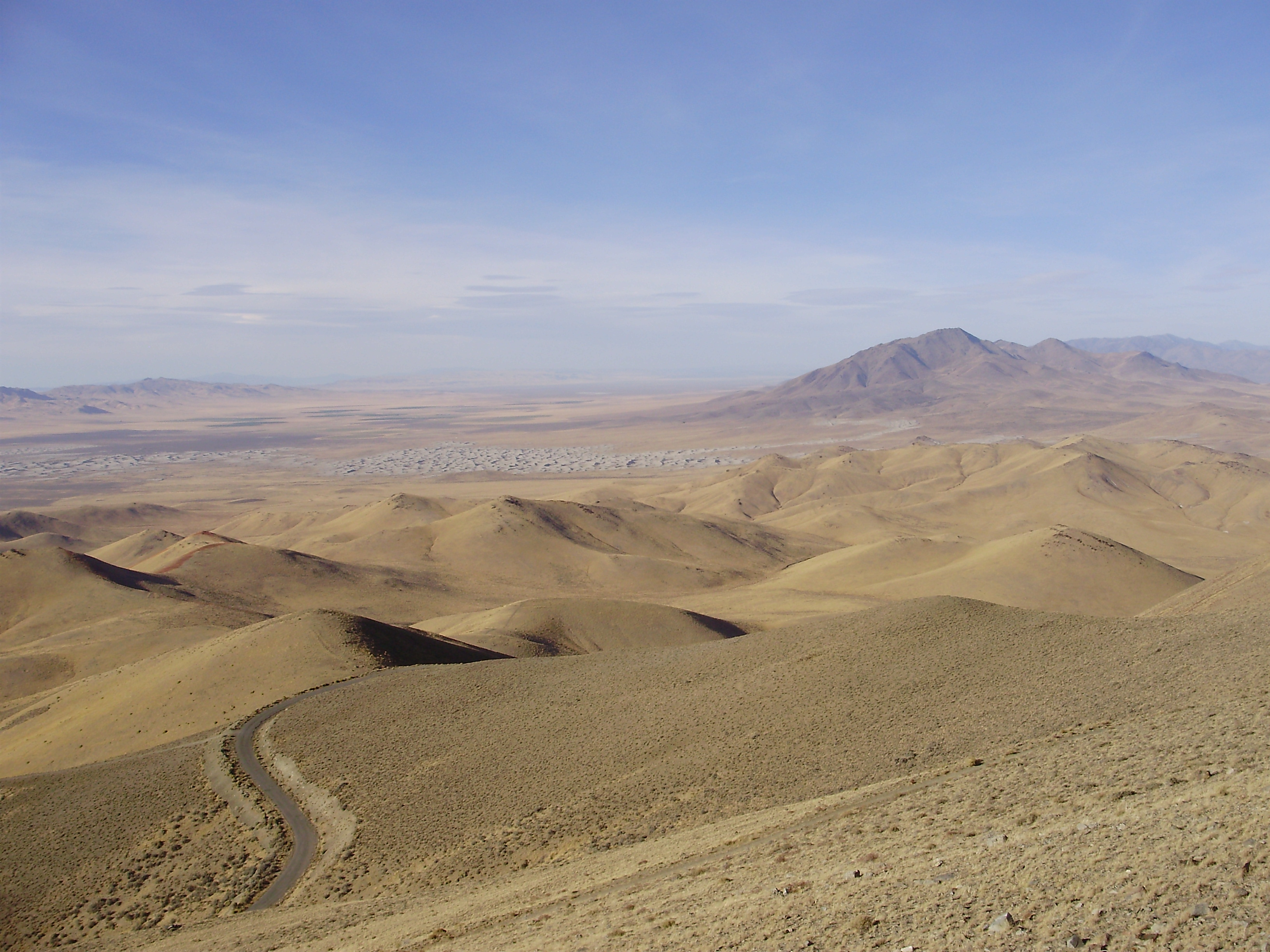
View north-northwest from the summit

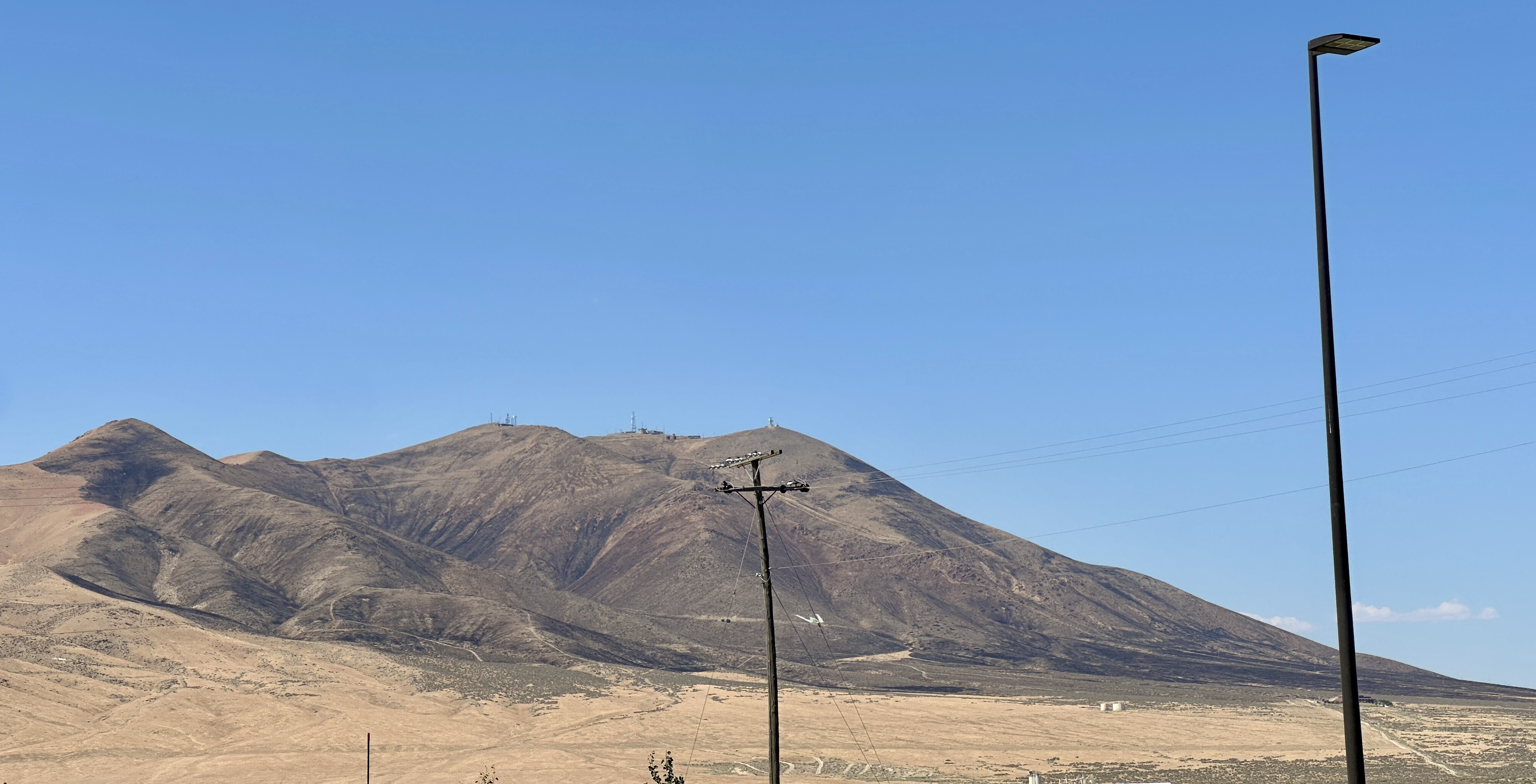
View after the Winnemucca Mountain Fire
