= 2020 Nevada wildfires =

Wildfire season in Nevada, United States

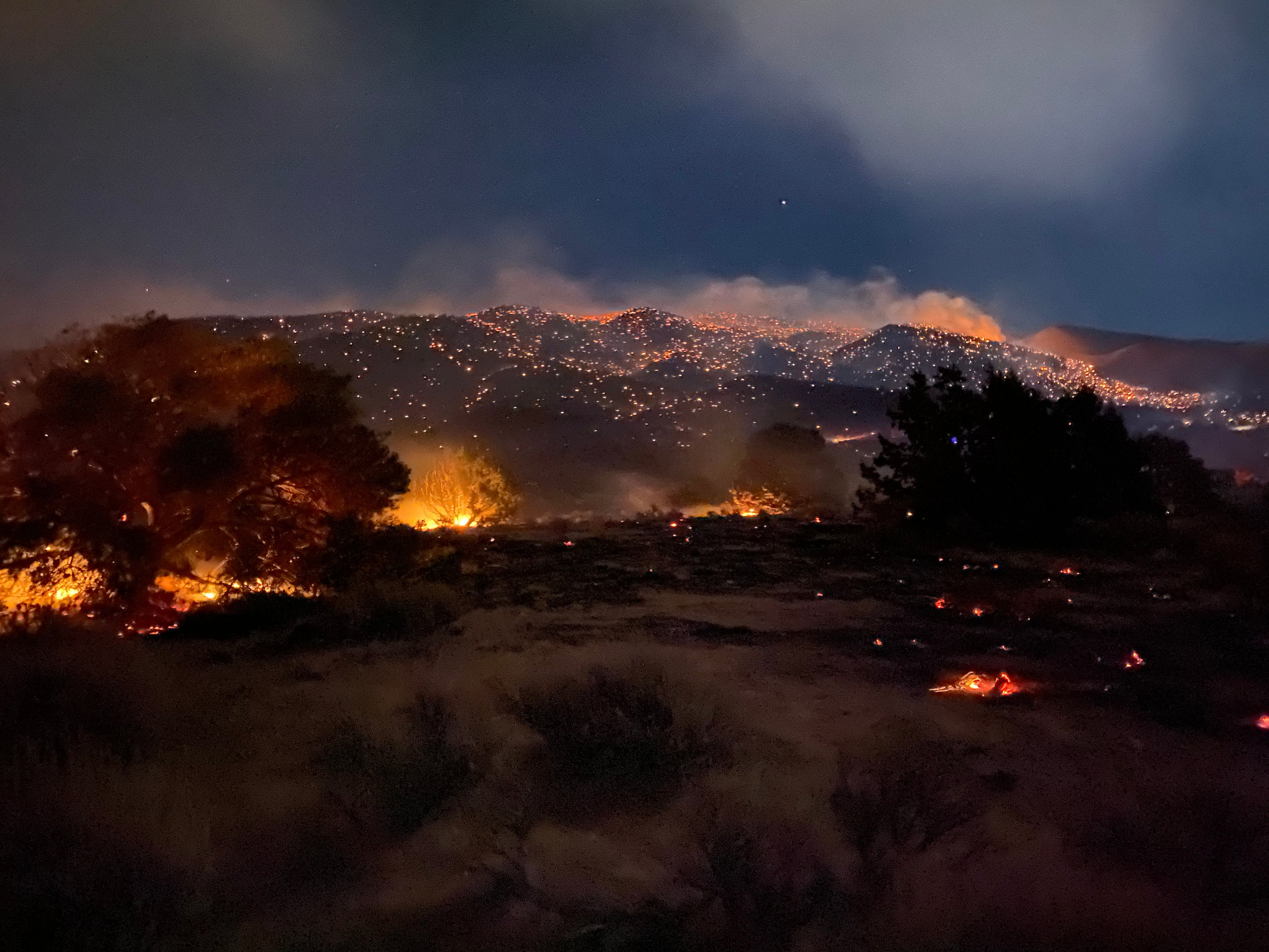
- Numbers Fire burning in the Pine Nut Mountains

The 2020 Nevada wildfire season began in June 2020. The season is a part of the 2020 Western United States wildfire season.

== Background ==
While the typical "fire season" in Nevada varies every year, most wildfires occur in between May and October. This is the time when vegetation is the driest. There are several other factors, as well, including when there is hot and dry weather, the particular amount of dry vegetation, and when more natural causes, such as lightning, are possible.

== List of wildfires ==
The following is a list of fires that burned more than 1,000 acres (400 ha) or produced significant structural damage or casualties.

Name	County	Acres	Start date	Containment date (Note: Containment means that fire crews have established and secured control lines around the fire's perimeter. These lines are artificial barriers, like trenches or cleared vegetation, designed to stop the fire's spread, or natural barriers like rivers. Containment reflects progress in managing the fire but does not necessarily mean the fire is starved of fuel, under control, or put out.)	Notes	Ref
Taft	White Pine	1,118	May 10		Lightning-caused. Burned west of State Route 893.	
Ibapah	Elko	7,153	May 29		Lightning-caused. Burned west of Wendover Air Force Base.	
Brown	White Pine	8,268	June 24		Portion of the town of Lund was evacuated.	
Monarch	Douglas	2,324	June 25	June 29	Lightning-caused.	
Twin	Lincoln	25,110	June 25	July 14	Portion burned in the South Pahroc Range Wilderness.	
Miller	Lincoln	4,519	June 26		Lightning-caused.	
Poeville	Washoe	2,975	June 26	July 6	Prompted evacuations in Reno. Caused two injuries and destroyed eleven structures.	
Mahogany	Clark	2,758	June 28	July 7	Impacted air quality in Las Vegas.	
Numbers	Douglas	18,342	July 6	July 14	3 homes and 37 outbuildings destroyed. Caused by a truck with mechanical issues.	
Meadow Valley	Lincoln	59,265	July 7		Human-caused.	
Bishop	Lincoln	13,008	July 29	August 11	Human-caused.	

== See also ==
- 2024 Nevada wildfires
- Pinehaven Fire
