= Lund Grade School =

- U.S. National Register of Historic Places
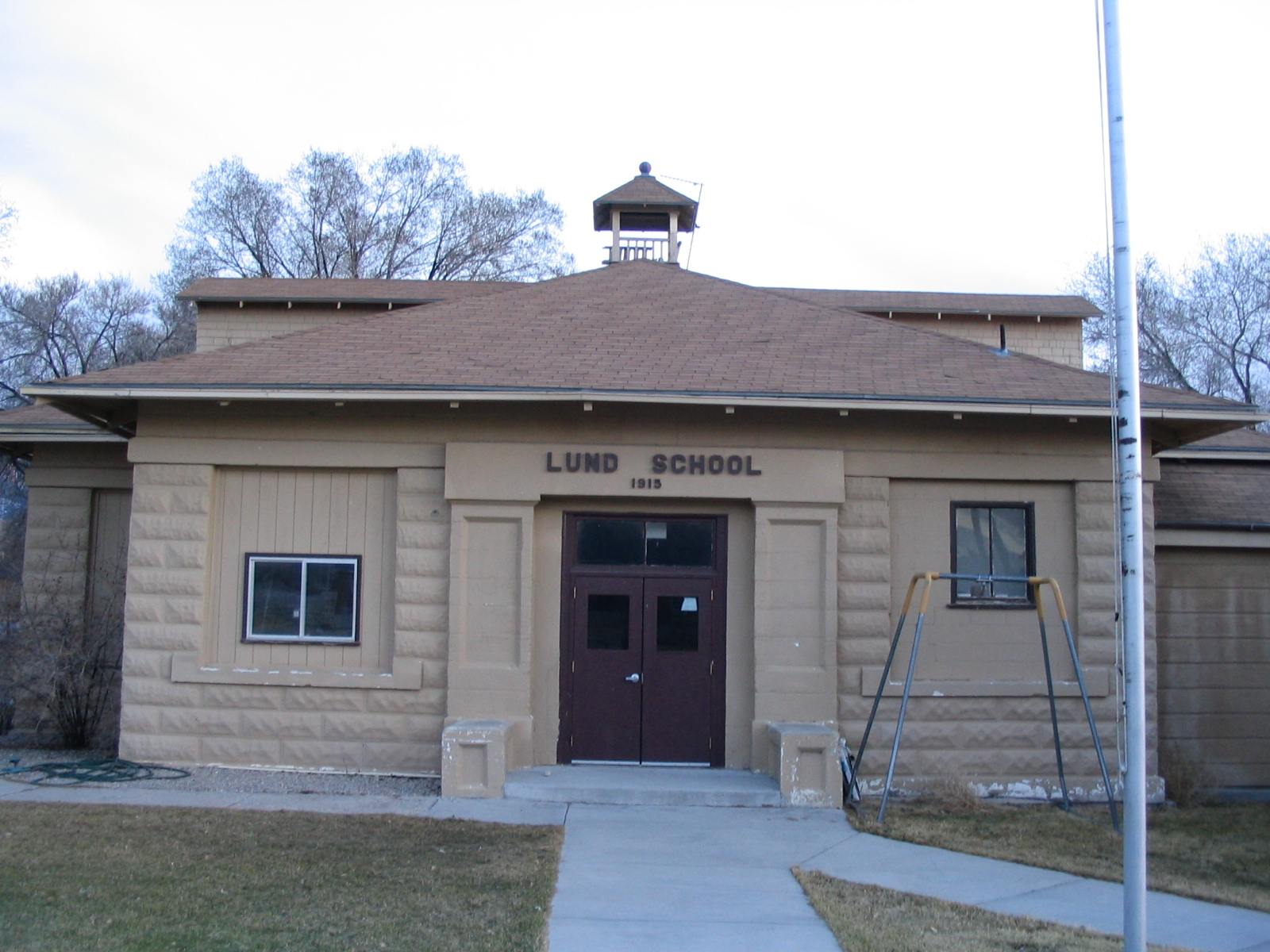

- Location within Nevada
- Location: 30 W Center St., Lund, Nevada
- Coordinates: 38°51′31″N 115°00′31″W
- Built: 1915
- NRHP reference No.: 100003200
- Added to NRHP: December 7, 2018

The Lund Grade School, at 30 W Center St. in Lund, Nevada, was listed on the National Register of Historic Places in 2018.

It was built in 1915 and was operated as a school by the White Pine County School District up to 2005.

It is a 1 1/2-story, Craftsman-style schoolhouse located in the middle of Lund.

The nomination to the National Register was authored by Marion Francis of the Lund Historical Society.
