= KHYX =

Coordinates: 41°00′30″N 117°46′09″W

- Winnemucca, Nevada; United States
- Broadcast area: Winnemucca, Nevada
- Frequency: 102.7 MHz (HD Radio)
- Branding: Mix 102.7 FM

Programming
- Format: Hot adult contemporary
- Subchannels: HD2: Active rock "Rock 94.3"

Ownership
- Owner: Jason and Kelly Crossett; (Nomadic Broadcasting LLC (Formerly Ruby Radio Corporation)

History
- First air date: 2013
- Former call signs: KQGD (2011–2013)

Technical information
- Licensing authority: FCC
- Facility ID: 171502
- Class: C2
- ERP: 500 watts
- HAAT: 646 meters (2,119 ft)
- Translator: HD2: 94.3 K232BK (Winnemucca)

Links
- Public license information: Public file; LMS
- Webcast: Listen live; HD2: Listen live
- Website: www.1027mix.com; HD2: www.rockninefourthree.com

KHYX (102.7 FM) is a radio station airing a hot adult contemporary format, licensed to Winnemucca, Nevada. The station is owned by Jason and Kelly Crossett, through licensee Nomadic Broadcasting LLC.

Previous logo

Nomadic Broadcasting is headquartered in Winnemucca.

== History ==
The station came on the air in 2013. The station was originally assigned the call sign KQGD in 2011 before adopting KHYX in 2013.
