= Brown Fire =

2020 wildfire in Nevada, United States

- Part of the 2020 Nevada wildfires
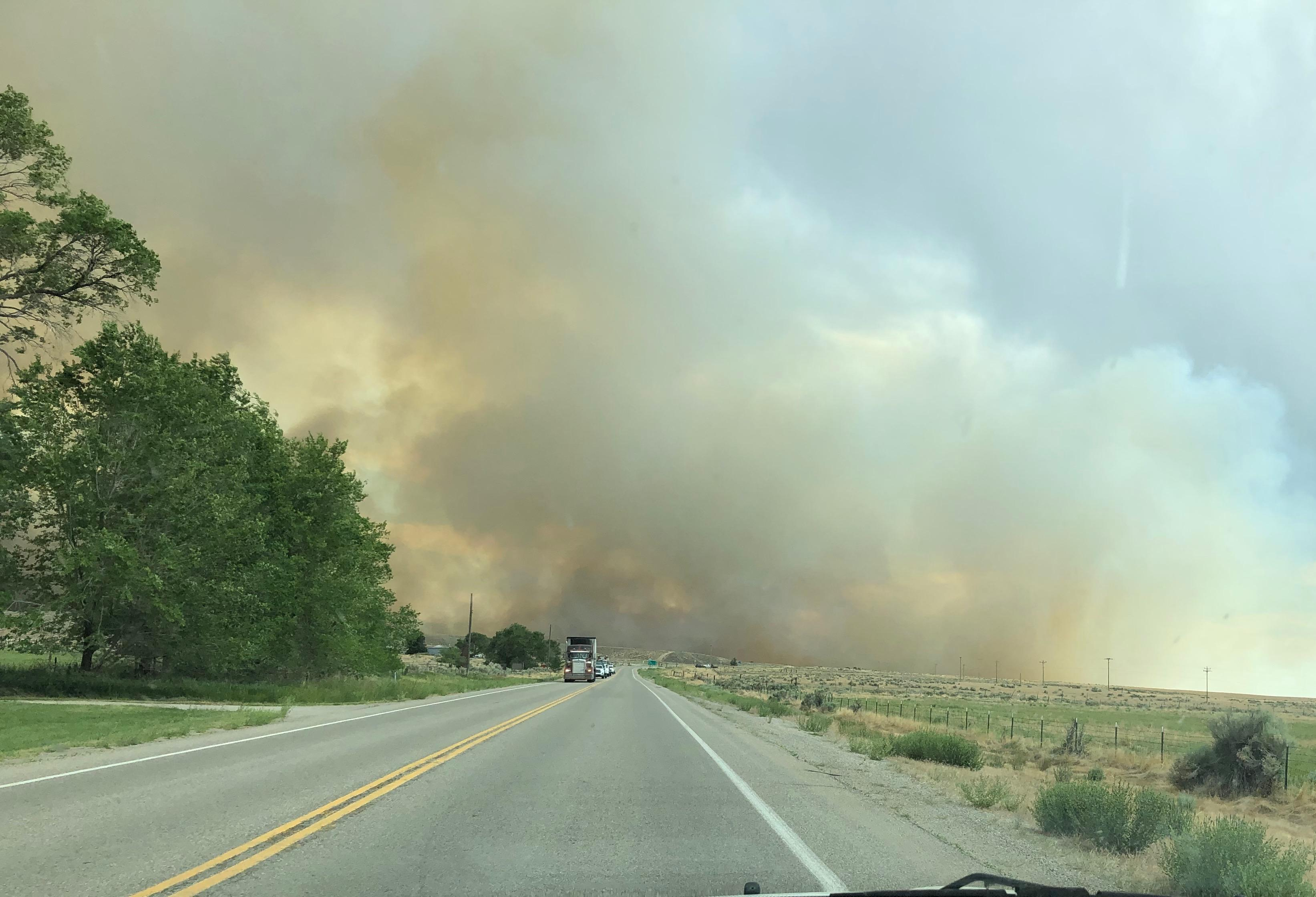
- Brown Fire on June 25, 2020
- Date: June 24, 2020 – June 30, 2020
- Location: Lund, White Pine County, Nevada, United States
- Coordinates: 38.833°N 114.988°W

Statistics
- Burned area: 8,268 acres (3,346 ha)

Ignition
- Cause: Unknown

Map
- Location in Nevada

The Brown Fire was a wildfire that burned in Lund, Nevada in the United States. First reported on June 24, 2020, the Brown Fire burned 8,268 acres (3,346 ha) and was contained on June 30, 2020. The fire skirted along Highway 318 and threatened the south side of Lund, resulting in the mandatory evacuation of residents in the southern part of the community. The cause of the fire remains under investigation.

== Events ==
The Brown Fire was first reported on June 24, 2020 around 3:00 pm EST, burning on the south and east side of the community of Lund, Nevada. The fire was initially estimated to be around 2,000 acres (809 ha) and growing, fueled by grass, brush and timber, and moving closer to Lund and skirting along Highway 318. This resulted in the mandatory evacuation of the south side of Lund and the closure of Highway 318 at Lanes Coffee Shop & Travel Store. By the evening of June 24, residents were allowed to return to their homes.

The Brown Fire was contained on June 30, 2020 and burned 8,268 acres (3,346 ha).

== Impact ==
The Brown Fire's rapid growth towards the small town of Lund resulted in residents on the south side of the community to be evacuated on June 24. They were allowed to return that same evening. Parts of Highway 318 were also closed, as the fire burned close to roadway.

Smoke from the fire impacted air quality in various regions, including Washington County, Utah.

== See also ==
- 2020 Nevada wildfires
