= Poeville Fire =

Wildfire in Nevada

- Part of 2020 Nevada wildfires
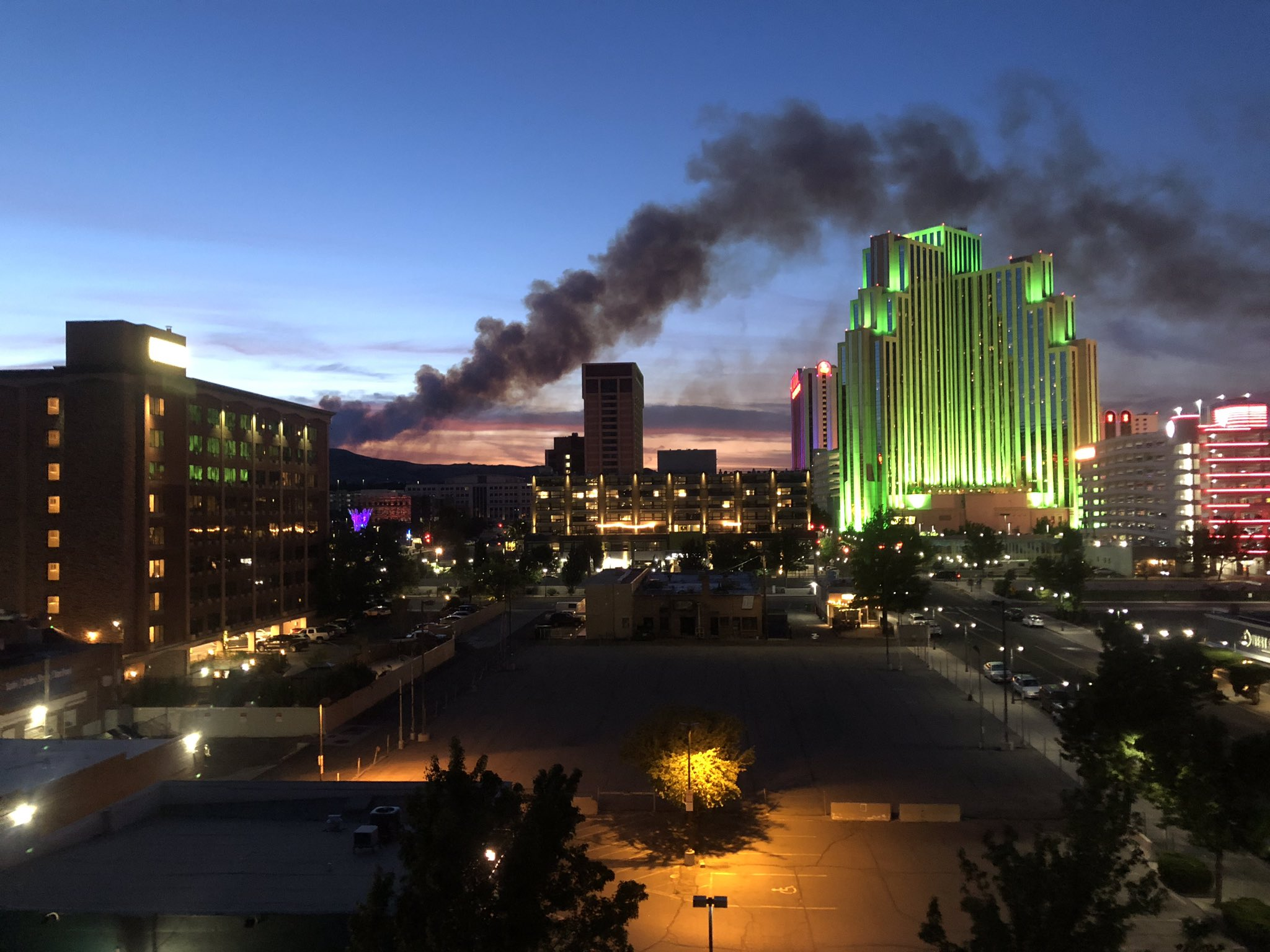
- The Poeville Fire visible from downtown Reno, Nevada, on June 27, 2020
- Date: June 26, 2020–July 6, 2020
- Location: Washoe County, Nevada, United States
- Coordinates: 38.878°N 119.563°W

Statistics
- Burned area: 2,975 acres (1,204 ha)

Impacts
- Injuries: 2 civilians
- Structures destroyed: 11

Ignition
- Cause: Under investigation

Map
- Location in Nevada

The Poeville Fire was a wildfire that burned on Peavine Mountain near Reno in Nevada, United States. The fire was reported on June 26, 2020. It burned 2,975 acres (1,204 ha) and was contained on July 6, 2020. Eight structures were destroyed, including one home. The fire threatened businesses, roads and neighborhoods on the northwest side of Reno and resulted in the evacuation of over 400 people. Initially thought to have been started by a vehicle fire, the cause remains under investigation due to fire crews finding a second point of origin. The fire destroyed eleven structures and injured two civilians.

== Events ==
=== June ===
The Poeville Fire was reported as burning on the east side of Peavine Mountain on the northwest side of Reno, Nevada on June 26, 2020. The fire was started by a vehicle fire. The fire was quickly contained at 1.4 acres (1 ha). However, by the next day, the fire, helped by high winds, quickly grew. The fire moved towards Reno, approximately five miles north of the University of Nevada, Reno, burning close Virginia Avenue, threatening homes. Air support was brought in to fight the fire alongside hand crews.

The fast movement of the fire led to mandatory evacuations being put in place for residences in Horizon Hills and Raleigh Heights, a mobile home park west of Golden Valley, all businesses north of Lemmon Drive and southwest of Highway 395, and various other roads in the area. An evacuation center was set up at 9th and Wells in Reno. Smoke from the fire began impacting air quality in Spanish Springs and Hungry Valley and representatives of Humboldt-Toiyabe National Forest, who were helping to manage the fire, suggested that residents in those areas prepare in case they need to evacuate. Evacuations were soon expanded to Hoge Road south to Rancho San Rafael Regional Park. Power was turned off for 8,500 residents. At 5:13 PM, Truckee Meadows Fire & Rescue announced that two drones had flown over the fire, causing all air support to be grounded for an hour.

By the afternoon of June 28, the fire had grown to an estimated 3,500 acres (1,416 ha) and was 10 percent contained. Eight structures were reported as destroyed. Evacuation orders were lifted except for Heindel Road and Meyers Avenue. The next morning, June 29, the acreage was reduced to 3,000 acres (1,214 ha) and 30 percent contained. It was announced by the Truckee Meadows Fire Protection District that a possible second point of origin was discovered for the fire. Therefore, a second investigation team was brought in from the Bureau of Land Management and the cause of the fire remains under investigation. Additionally, two injuries were reported.

=== July ===
As of the morning of July 1, 2020, fire suppression efforts had begun. The Poeville Fire was contained by July 6, burning a total of 2,975 acres (1,204 ha).

== Impact ==
The fire resulted in the evacuation of approximately 400 individuals and communities on the outskirt of Reno, Nevada. The fire impacted recreational activities on Peavine Mountain, including hiking.

=== Evacuations ===
The fast growth of the Poeville Fire led to immediate mandatory evacuations of areas of northwestern Reno, totaling approximately 400 residents in Horizon Hills, Raleigh Heights, a mobile home park west of Golden Valley, buildings north of Lemmon Dr. and southwest of Highway 395 and numerous roads in the area. Later that day, more evacuations were put in place, specifically Hoge Road south to Rancho San Rafael Regional Park. Evacuation centers were offered at the Washoe County Senior Center and livestock were evacuated to Reno-Sparks Livestock Events Center. Due to COVID-19, evacuees at the senior center were asked to stay in their cars and volunteers from the American Red Cross would visit each car with resources and information. In total, the evacuation center hosted 45 families and the Red Cross supported 102 individuals.

=== Infrastructure ===
Power was turned off for an estimated 8,500 residents starting on June 27. Eleven structures were destroyed, including one house.

=== Injuries ===
There were two injuries as a result of the Poeville Fire.

=== Air quality ===
Smoke from the Poeville Fire was visible and/or affected air quality in southern Washoe County (including Reno, Carson City, and Carson Valley), northern Storey and Lyon counties, and Pershing County.

== Investigation ==
Initially thought to have been started by a vehicle fire, the cause remains under investigation due to fire crews finding a second point of origin.

== See also ==
- 2020 Nevada wildfires
