= Lund, Nevada =

- Census-designated place
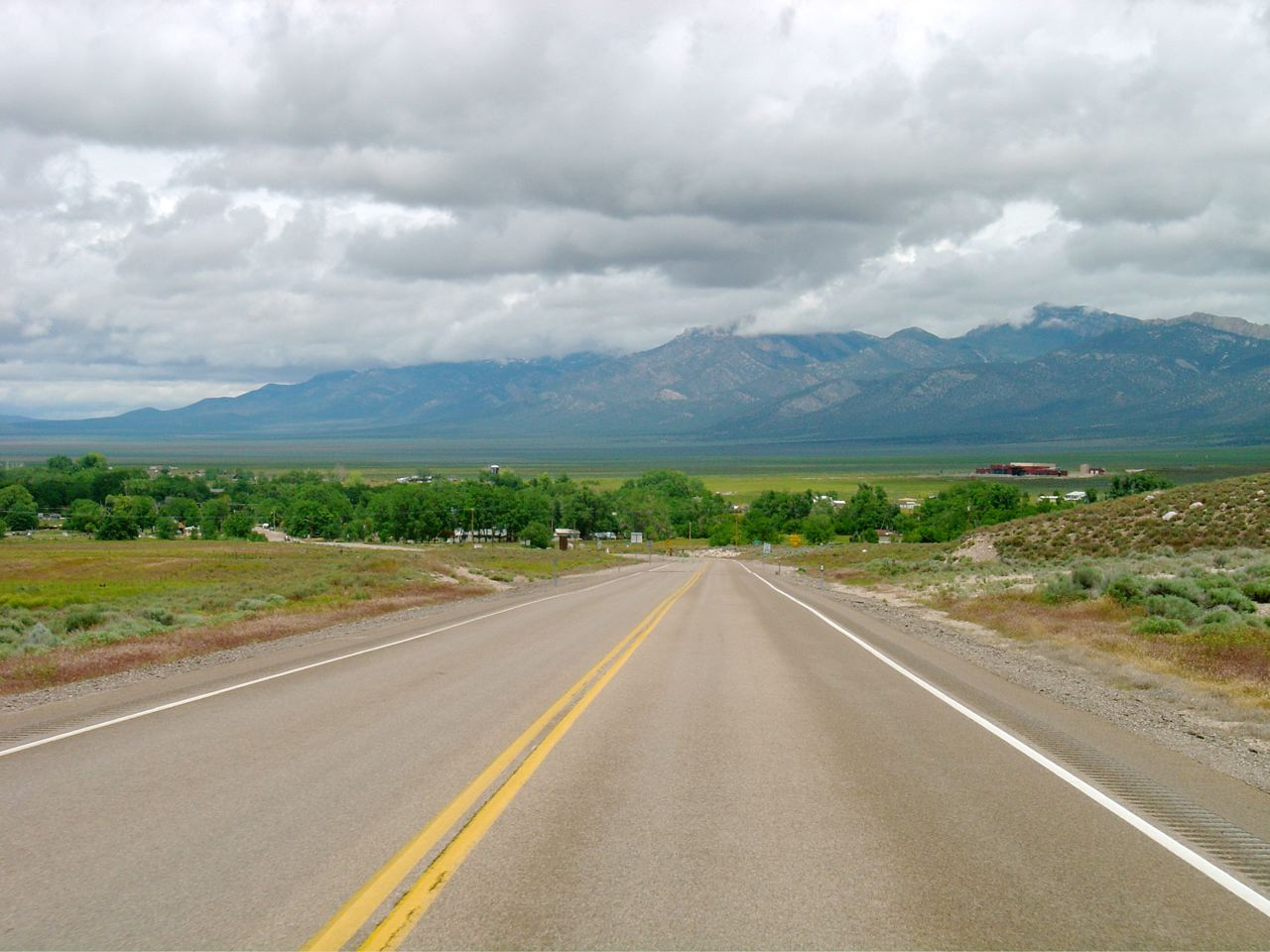
- Lund from northbound Nevada State Route 318

- Location within the state of Nevada and within the USA Lund (the United States)
- Coordinates: 38°51′42″N 115°00′22″W
- Country: United States
- State: Nevada
- County: White Pine

Area
  - Total: 1.97 sq mi (5.10 km^{2})
  - Land: 1.97 sq mi (5.10 km^{2})
  - Water: 0 sq mi (0.00 km^{2})
- Elevation: 5,574 ft (1,699 m)

Population (2020)
  - Total: 211
  - Density: 107.2/sq mi (41.39/km^{2})
- Time zone: UTC-8 (Pacific (PST))
  - Summer (DST): UTC-7 (PDT)
- ZIP code: 89317
- Area code: 775
- FIPS code: 32-43400
- GNIS feature ID: 2583940

Lund is a small town and census-designated place in White Pine County, Nevada, United States. The population of Lund as of 2020 was 211.

== Toponymy ==
When members from the Church of Jesus Christ of Latter-day Saints settled in the area, Lund was named for Anthon H. Lund, a Mormon church official. Before the advent of the LDS people, the town site and spring were named for Tom Plane, an earlier occupant.

== History ==
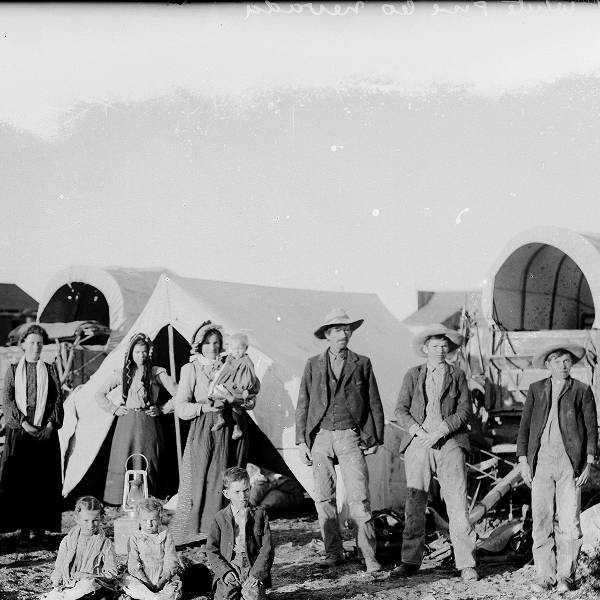
Pioneer Joseph Smith Leavitt and family in Lund, ca. 1902

In the early 1870s, Tom Plane operated a ranch based near Lund Spring. He employed ranch hands that grew feed and food and raised live stock to support needs of the mining towns. His ranch house was a welcome respite for travelers on the Hamilton-Pioche road. Later, James R. Withington gained ownership of Tom Plane's ranch and built White Pine County's first flour mill at the Tom Plane's spring head.

Lund was settled in 1898 on land that the United States government had given the Church of Jesus Christ of Latter-day Saints (LDS Church) in lieu of land that had been confiscated under the Edmunds–Tucker Act. The first settlers were Latter-day Saints, and the LDS Church still has a ward in Lund.

On June 24, 2020, the Brown Fire threatened Lund, resulting in residents on the south side being evacuated from their homes. Residents were allowed to return that evening. The Brown Fire burned over 8,000 acres (3,237 ha).

== Education ==
The co-located Lund Elementary School (K-5) and Lund High School (6-12) operate as Lund Combined Schools, part of the White Pine County School District. Lund Grade School, built in 1915, operated for 90 years until 2005. The school building was added to the National Register of Historic Places in 2018 after being nominated by local residents.

== Transportation ==
Lund is served by Nevada State Route 318 which passes through the town.

== Demographics ==
Historical population
Census	Pop.	Note	%±
2010	282		—
2020	211		−25.2%
U.S. Decennial Census

== Climate ==
Climate data for Lund, Nevada (1991–2020 normals, extremes 1957–2018)
Month	Jan	Feb	Mar	Apr	May	Jun	Jul	Aug	Sep	Oct	Nov	Dec	Year
Record high °F (°C)	68 (20)	75 (24)	80 (27)	83 (28)	94 (34)	99 (37)	104 (40)	104 (40)	95 (35)	90 (32)	78 (26)	69 (21)	104 (40)
Mean maximum °F (°C)	55.8 (13.2)	61.0 (16.1)	68.7 (20.4)	76.9 (24.9)	85.3 (29.6)	92.2 (33.4)	97.0 (36.1)	95.3 (35.2)	89.0 (31.7)	80.1 (26.7)	68.6 (20.3)	58.0 (14.4)	97.9 (36.6)
Mean daily maximum °F (°C)	42.5 (5.8)	46.0 (7.8)	54.4 (12.4)	60.6 (15.9)	69.9 (21.1)	80.8 (27.1)	88.3 (31.3)	86.6 (30.3)	78.4 (25.8)	65.9 (18.8)	52.9 (11.6)	42.2 (5.7)	64.0 (17.8)
Daily mean °F (°C)	28.1 (−2.2)	31.7 (−0.2)	38.6 (3.7)	44.0 (6.7)	52.3 (11.3)	61.3 (16.3)	68.4 (20.2)	66.7 (19.3)	58.9 (14.9)	47.6 (8.7)	36.4 (2.4)	27.5 (−2.5)	46.8 (8.2)
Mean daily minimum °F (°C)	13.7 (−10.2)	17.5 (−8.1)	22.7 (−5.2)	27.3 (−2.6)	34.8 (1.6)	41.9 (5.5)	48.6 (9.2)	46.9 (8.3)	39.5 (4.2)	29.3 (−1.5)	20.0 (−6.7)	12.9 (−10.6)	29.6 (−1.3)
Mean minimum °F (°C)	−0.3 (−17.9)	1.6 (−16.9)	10.0 (−12.2)	15.0 (−9.4)	23.7 (−4.6)	32.0 (0.0)	41.0 (5.0)	38.7 (3.7)	29.4 (−1.4)	18.0 (−7.8)	5.2 (−14.9)	−1.3 (−18.5)	−6.2 (−21.2)
Record low °F (°C)	−20 (−29)	−12 (−24)	−2 (−19)	−3 (−19)	13 (−11)	23 (−5)	33 (1)	32 (0)	19 (−7)	5 (−15)	−11 (−24)	−17 (−27)	−20 (−29)
Average precipitation inches (mm)	0.94 (24)	0.96 (24)	0.96 (24)	0.80 (20)	0.91 (23)	0.74 (19)	0.52 (13)	0.77 (20)	0.75 (19)	0.88 (22)	0.57 (14)	0.70 (18)	9.50 (241)
Average snowfall inches (cm)	6.0 (15)	4.1 (10)	2.7 (6.9)	0.8 (2.0)	0.1 (0.25)	0.0 (0.0)	0.0 (0.0)	0.0 (0.0)	0.0 (0.0)	0.0 (0.0)	1.3 (3.3)	6.6 (17)	21.6 (55)
Average precipitation days (≥ 0.01 in)	5.9	5.8	5.8	5.6	6.0	3.0	4.1	4.5	3.2	4.0	3.7	4.8	56.4
Average snowy days (≥ 0.1 in)	2.1	1.9	1.2	0.4	0.1	0.0	0.0	0.0	0.0	0.0	0.6	2.0	8.3
Source: NOAA (mean maxima/minima 1981–2010)

== See also ==
- Mount Grafton Wilderness
