= Trout Canyon, Nevada =

Unincorporated community in Nevada, US

Trout Canyon
- Unincorporated community
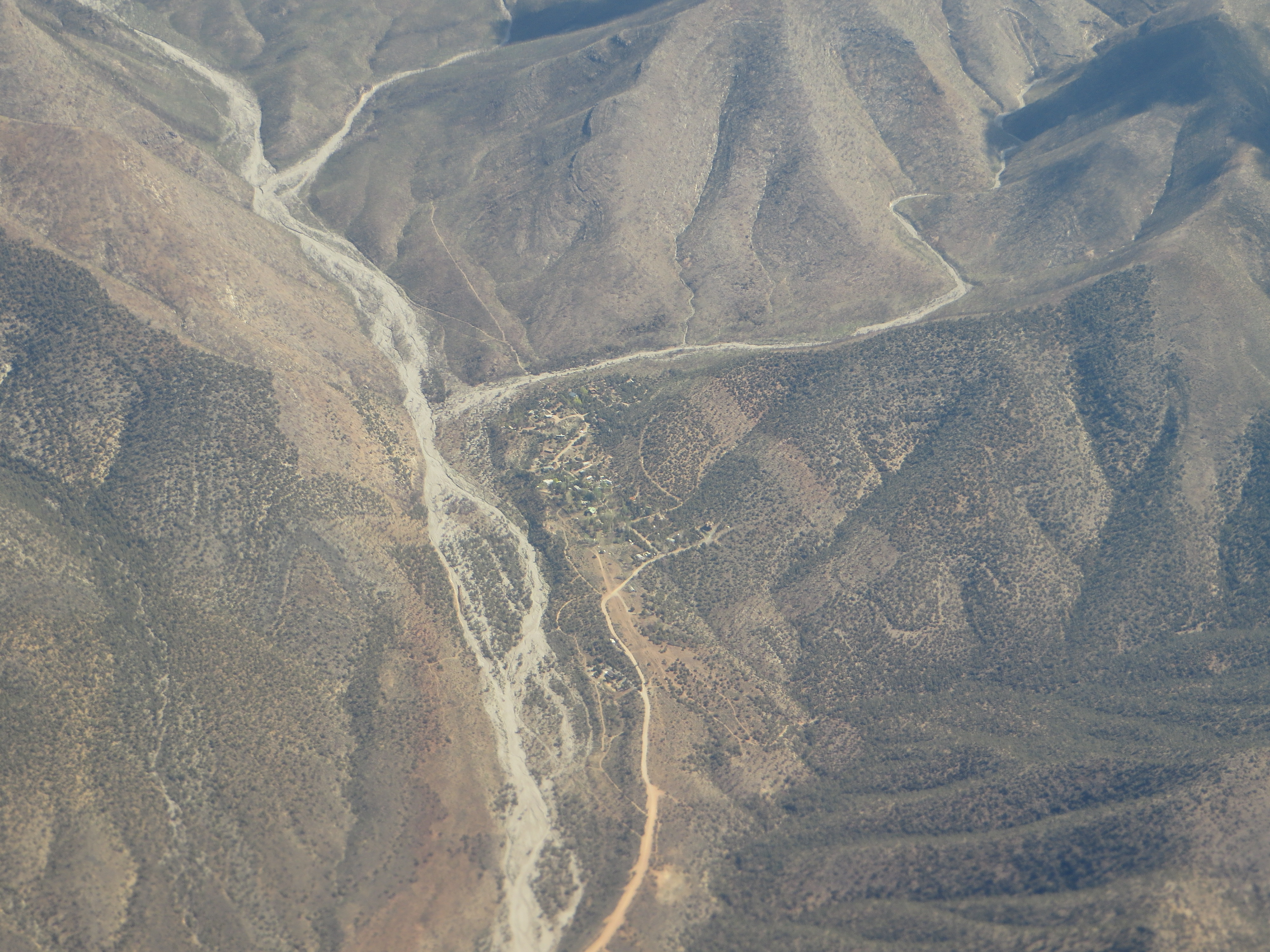
- Trout Canyon, Nevada

- Location within Nevada Location within the United States
- Coordinates: 36°10′57″N 115°40′46″W
- Country: United States
- State: Nevada
- County: Clark
- Named for: Trout Canyon
- Time zone: UTC-8 (Pacific (PST))
  - Summer (DST): UTC-7 (PDT)
- ZIP code: 89124
- Area codes: 702/725

Trout Canyon is an unincorporated community in Clark County, Nevada, United States.

== History ==
From 1 July 2013 to 18 August 2013, the Carpenter 1 Fire took place in the Spring Mountains and impacted the Trout Canyon area after lightning struck the area. The wildfire damaged the over 50 years old water system of Trout Canyon, which used metal pipes constructed of World War II-era ammunition canisters that collected spring water to provide it to the community. On 19 August 2013, Las Vegas Valley Water District agreed to make repairs to the system for $35,000. The repairs were nearly complete when the pipeline was washed away by a flash flood. As of 2018, multiple homes in the community still had dry taps.

On July 7, 2018, another, smaller wildfire in Trout Canyon caused by a lightning strike burned 50 acres of land.

== Geography ==
The community of Trout Canyon is named after and located in Trout Canyon of the Spring Mountains. The community is located roughly 13 miles east of Pahrump and 60 miles west of Las Vegas.

== Trout Canyon Road ==
Trout Canyon is served by Trout Canyon Road, a roughly 11 mile unpaved road leading from Nevada State Route 160 just south of Pahrump in Nye County to the community.
