= White Pine County School District =

School district in Nevada, United States

The White Pine County School District is the public school district of White Pine County, Nevada.

The superintendent in 2018 is Adam Young.

It includes:

- White Pine High School, in Ely, Nevada
- Steptoe Valley High School, Ely
- White Pine Middle School, Ely
- David E. Norman Elementary School, Ely
- McGill Elementary School, in McGill
- Baker Grade School, in Baker
- Lund K-12 School, in North Lund

It operated the Lund Grade School until 2005. Its building was listed on the National Register of Historic Places in 2018.

The high schools in Lund and Ely take students from the Duckwater area. As of 1986 students going to Ely often stay with area families who provide boarding.
