= Winnemucca, Nevada =

City in Nevada, United States

Winnemucca
- City
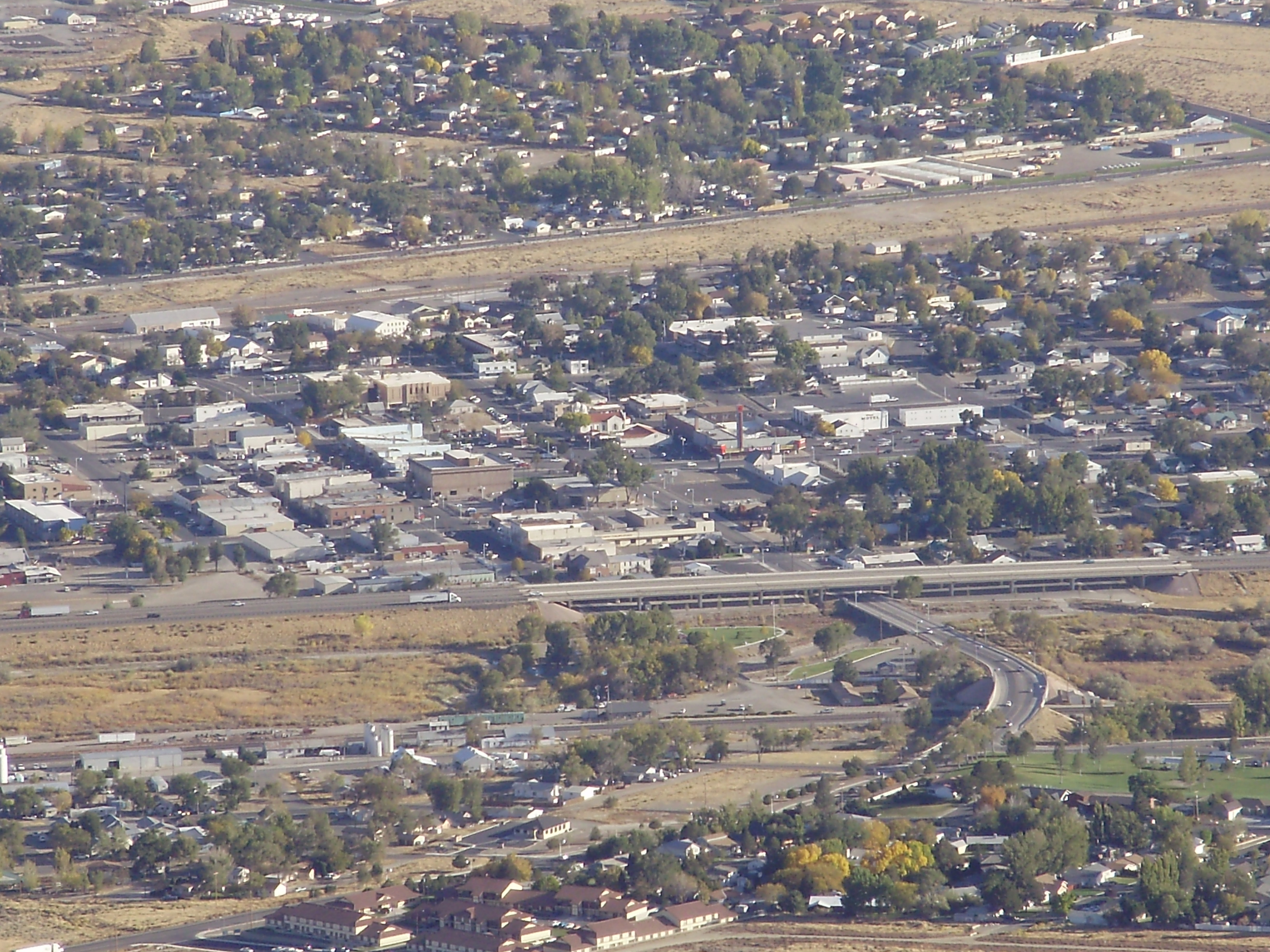
- Downtown Winnemucca viewed from Winnemucca Mountain

- Seal
- Nickname: City of Paved Streets
- Humboldt County and City of Winnemucca, Nevada

- Location within Nevada Location within the United States
- Coordinates: 40°58′6″N 117°43′36″W
- Country: United States
- State: Nevada
- County: Humboldt
- Named for: Chief Winnemucca

Government
  - Mayor: Rich Stone

Area
  - Total: 9.77 sq mi (25.30 km^{2})
  - Land: 9.77 sq mi (25.30 km^{2})
  - Water: 0 sq mi (0.00 km^{2})
- Elevation: 4,295 ft (1,309 m)

Population (2020)
  - Total: 8,431
  - Density: 863.0/sq mi (333.22/km^{2})
- Time zone: UTC−8 (Pacific (PST))
  - Summer (DST): UTC−7 (PDT)
- ZIP codes: 89445, 89446
- Area code: 775
- FIPS code: 32-84800
- GNIS feature ID: 0844996
- Website: www.winnemuccacity.org

Winnemucca (/ˌwɪnəˈmʌkə/) is the only incorporated city in Humboldt County, Nevada, United States, of which it is also the county seat, encompassing approximately half of the total population of the county. As of the 2020 census, the city had a total population of 8,431, up 14% from the 2010 census figure of 7,396. Interstate 80 passes through the city, where it meets U.S. Route 95.

== History and culture ==
The town was named for the 19th-century Chief Winnemucca of the local Northern Paiute tribe, who traditionally lived in this area. Winnemucca, translated, means "the giver." The chief's daughter, Sarah Winnemucca, was an advocate for education and fair treatment of the Paiute and Shoshone tribes in the area. Their family all learned to speak English, and Sarah worked as an interpreter, scout and messenger for the United States Army during the Bannock War of 1878. In 1883, Sarah Winnemucca published the first autobiography written by a Native American woman, based on hundreds of lectures she'd given in the Northeast and mid-Atlantic. It has been described as "one of the most enduring ethno-historical books written by an American Indian."

On September 16, 1868, the Central Pacific Railroad reached Winnemucca, and was officially opened on October 1 of that year. It was a stop on the first transcontinental railroad completed the following year.

Basque immigrants worked as sheep-herders starting in the mid-19th century. In honor of this heritage, Winnemucca hosts an annual Basque Festival.

On September 19, 1900, Butch Cassidy's gang robbed the First National Bank of Winnemucca of $32,640.

According to a billboard along State Route 140 (the "Winnemucca to the Sea Highway"), Winnemucca styles itself "The City of Paved Streets".

Winnemucca is home to the Buckaroo Hall of Fame and Heritage Museum.

=== Chinatown ===
In the late 19th and early 20th centuries, Winnemucca had a vibrant Chinatown. The Chinese originally came to the area as workers on the transcontinental Central Pacific Railroad, which reached Winnemucca in 1868. Some remained or returned to settle.

During the 1890s, around 400 Chinese formed a community in the town. Among their prominent buildings was the Joss House on Baud Street, a place of worship and celebration. In 1911, the community was visited by Sun Yat-Sen, later to become Chinese president. He was on a fund-raising tour of the United States to help the Xinhai Revolution.

Over time most structures in the Chinatown neighborhood were abandoned and fell into disrepair. Due to safety and fire risks, the Winnemucca city council orderd the demolishment of The Joss House, the last remaining structure associated with Chinatown. Despite objections from some in the community, the house was demolished on March 8, 1955.

== Geography and climate ==
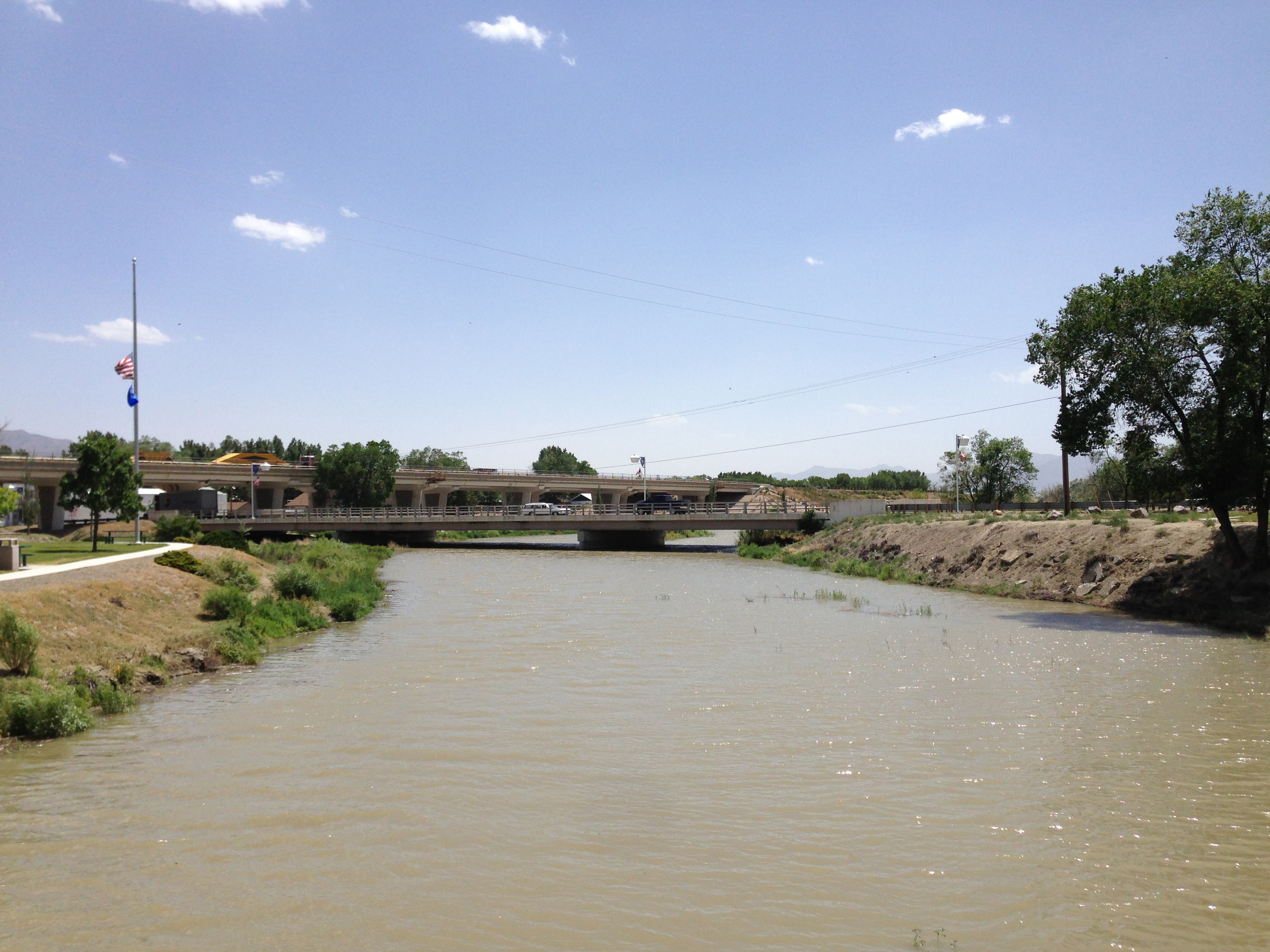
Winnemucca straddles the Humboldt River

Winnemucca is located at 40°58′6″N 117°43′36″W (40.968212, −117.726662).

According to the United States Census Bureau, the city has a total area of 9.4 square miles (24.3 km^{2}), all land.

Winnemucca's climate is semi-arid (Köppen climate classification BSk), averaging 8.28 in (210 mm) of precipitation annually. Summer days tend to be hot, but the temperature drops significantly at night. Winters are cold with generally light snow, with 22.0 in (56 cm) falling during a typical year. The highest recorded temperature in Winnemucca was 109 °F (43 °C), on July 11, 2002, and the lowest recorded temperature was −37 °F (−38 °C) on December 22, 1990. Freezing temperatures have been observed in every month of the year.

Climate data for Winnemucca, Nevada (Winnemucca Municipal Airport), 1991–2020 normals, extremes 1877–present
Month	Jan	Feb	Mar	Apr	May	Jun	Jul	Aug	Sep	Oct	Nov	Dec	Year
Record high °F (°C)	68 (20)	74 (23)	87 (31)	90 (32)	100 (38)	106 (41)	109 (43)	108 (42)	106 (41)	94 (34)	77 (25)	70 (21)	109 (43)
Mean maximum °F (°C)	55.9 (13.3)	62.8 (17.1)	72.0 (22.2)	80.0 (26.7)	89.4 (31.9)	98.1 (36.7)	103.1 (39.5)	100.8 (38.2)	94.7 (34.8)	83.8 (28.8)	69.1 (20.6)	58.1 (14.5)	103.7 (39.8)
Mean daily maximum °F (°C)	44.0 (6.7)	49.4 (9.7)	57.7 (14.3)	63.5 (17.5)	73.7 (23.2)	84.7 (29.3)	95.5 (35.3)	93.2 (34.0)	83.3 (28.5)	68.7 (20.4)	53.8 (12.1)	42.9 (6.1)	67.5 (19.8)
Daily mean °F (°C)	32.2 (0.1)	36.6 (2.6)	42.6 (5.9)	47.6 (8.7)	56.4 (13.6)	65.4 (18.6)	74.5 (23.6)	71.6 (22.0)	62.1 (16.7)	49.4 (9.7)	38.6 (3.7)	30.7 (−0.7)	50.6 (10.4)
Mean daily minimum °F (°C)	20.5 (−6.4)	23.9 (−4.5)	27.5 (−2.5)	31.6 (−0.2)	39.1 (3.9)	46.1 (7.8)	53.5 (11.9)	50.0 (10.0)	41.0 (5.0)	30.1 (−1.1)	23.4 (−4.8)	18.5 (−7.5)	33.8 (1.0)
Mean minimum °F (°C)	1.3 (−17.1)	6.7 (−14.1)	12.0 (−11.1)	16.8 (−8.4)	23.8 (−4.6)	31.2 (−0.4)	40.7 (4.8)	37.2 (2.9)	26.9 (−2.8)	13.8 (−10.1)	5.8 (−14.6)	−1.4 (−18.6)	−6.0 (−21.1)
Record low °F (°C)	−36 (−38)	−28 (−33)	−3 (−19)	6 (−14)	10 (−12)	23 (−5)	29 (−2)	26 (−3)	12 (−11)	−2 (−19)	−10 (−23)	−37 (−38)	−37 (−38)
Average precipitation inches (mm)	0.96 (24)	0.71 (18)	0.87 (22)	1.00 (25)	1.13 (29)	0.50 (13)	0.16 (4.1)	0.12 (3.0)	0.39 (9.9)	0.66 (17)	0.76 (19)	1.02 (26)	8.28 (210)
Average snowfall inches (cm)	4.4 (11)	3.7 (9.4)	3.0 (7.6)	1.8 (4.6)	0.1 (0.25)	0.0 (0.0)	0.0 (0.0)	0.0 (0.0)	0.0 (0.0)	0.5 (1.3)	2.6 (6.6)	5.9 (15)	22.0 (56)
Average precipitation days (≥ 0.01 in)	8.5	7.5	8.2	8.0	7.7	3.7	2.2	2.0	2.8	4.3	6.4	8.3	69.6
Average snowy days (≥ 0.1 in)	4.1	3.4	2.6	1.8	0.1	0.1	0.0	0.0	0.1	0.4	2.2	4.9	19.7
Average relative humidity (%)	69.9	61.9	55.3	46.5	40.4	37.6	28.8	30.0	36.5	47.8	63.0	69.3	48.9
Mean monthly sunshine hours	161.2	174.5	228.3	263.3	331.1	346.6	398.3	358.5	306.5	257.5	153.3	148.9	3,128
Percentage possible sunshine	54	59	62	66	74	77	87	84	82	75	51	52	70
Source: NOAA (sun and relative humidity 1961–1990)

== Demographics ==
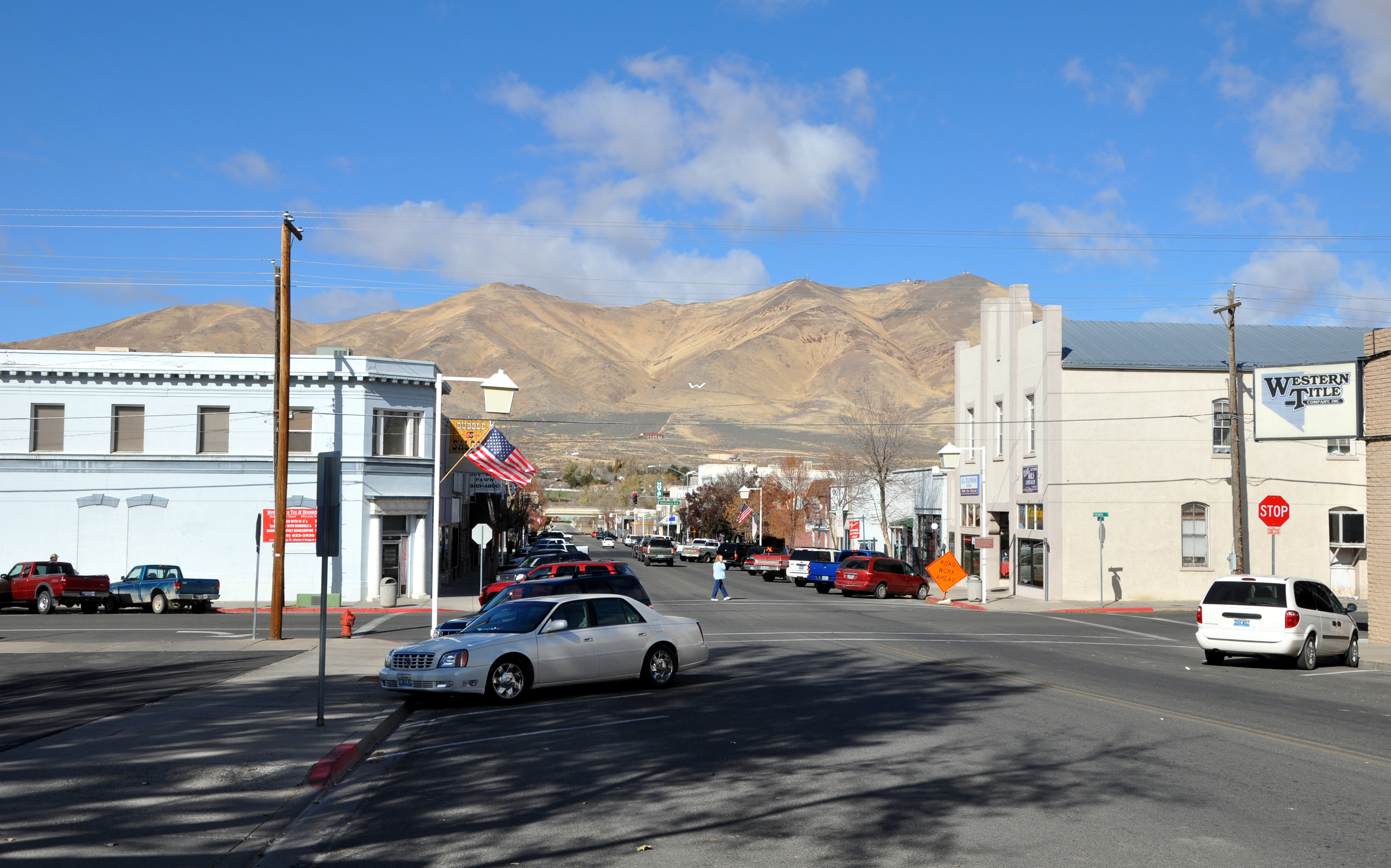
South Bridge Street in downtown Winnemucca

Historical population
Census	Pop.	Note	%±
1870	290		—
1880	763		163.1%
1890	1,307		71.3%
1900	1,110		−15.1%
1910	1,786		60.9%
1920	1,934		8.3%
1930	1,989		2.8%
1940	2,485		24.9%
1950	2,827		13.8%
1960	3,453		22.1%
1970	3,587		3.9%
1980	4,140		15.4%
1990	6,134		48.2%
2000	7,174		17.0%
2010	7,396		3.1%
2020	8,431		14.0%

=== 2020 census ===
As of the 2020 census, Winnemucca had a population of 8,431. The median age was 34.9 years. 26.7% of residents were under the age of 18 and 13.1% of residents were 65 years of age or older. For every 100 females there were 104.3 males, and for every 100 females age 18 and over there were 103.4 males age 18 and over.

95.0% of residents lived in urban areas, while 5.0% lived in rural areas.

There were 3,333 households in Winnemucca, of which 35.1% had children under the age of 18 living in them. Of all households, 45.9% were married-couple households, 23.3% were households with a male householder and no spouse or partner present, and 23.2% were households with a female householder and no spouse or partner present. About 30.4% of all households were made up of individuals and 11.6% had someone living alone who was 65 years of age or older.

There were 3,827 housing units, of which 12.9% were vacant. The homeowner vacancy rate was 1.0% and the rental vacancy rate was 9.5%.

Racial composition as of the 2020 census
Race	Number	Percent
White	5,755	68.3%
Black or African American	70	0.8%
American Indian and Alaska Native	253	3.0%
Asian	105	1.2%
Native Hawaiian and Other Pacific Islander	14	0.2%
Some other race	1,221	14.5%
Two or more races	1,013	12.0%
Hispanic or Latino (of any race)	2,510	29.8%

=== 2000 census ===
Largest ancestries (2000)	Percent
German	55%
Mexican	23%
Irish	11%
English	9%
Basque	4%

As of the census of 2000, there were 7,174 people, 2,736 households, and 1,824 families residing in the city. The population density was 867.5 inhabitants per square mile (334.9/km^{2}). There were 3,280 housing units at an average density of 396.6 per square mile (153.1/km^{2}). The racial makeup of the city was 83.41% White, 2.23% African American, 0.89% Native American, 0.32% Asian, 0.03% Pacific Islander, 9.60% from other races, and 3.51% from two or more races. Hispanic or Latino people of any race were 20.74% of the population.

Basque Americans make up 4.2% of the population of Winnemucca, the highest percentage of any city in the United States.

There were 2,736 households, out of which 37.8% had children under the age of 18 living with them, 53.9% were married couples living together, 8.6% had a female householder with no husband present, and 33.3% were non-families. 27.1% of all households were made up of individuals, and 8.7% had someone living alone who was 65 years of age or older. The average household size was 2.60 and the average family size was 3.21.

In the city, the population was spread out, with 30.2% under the age of 18, 7.9% from 18 to 24, 30.6% from 25 to 44, 22.3% from 45 to 64, and 9.0% who were 65 years of age or older. The median age was 34 years. For every 100 females, there were 105.1 males. For every 100 females age 18 and over, there were 104.5 males.

The median income for a household in the city was $46,699, and the median income for a family was $53,681. Males had a median income of $47,917 versus $26,682 for females. The per capita income for the city was $21,441. About 7.5% of families and 9.5% of the population were below the poverty line, including 10.8% of those under the age of 18 and 8.1% of those 65 and older.

== Politics ==
The Winnemucca Indian Colony of Nevada has its headquarters in Winnemucca. It is a federally recognized tribe of Western Shoshone and Northern Paiute Indians in northwestern Nevada.

== Transportation ==
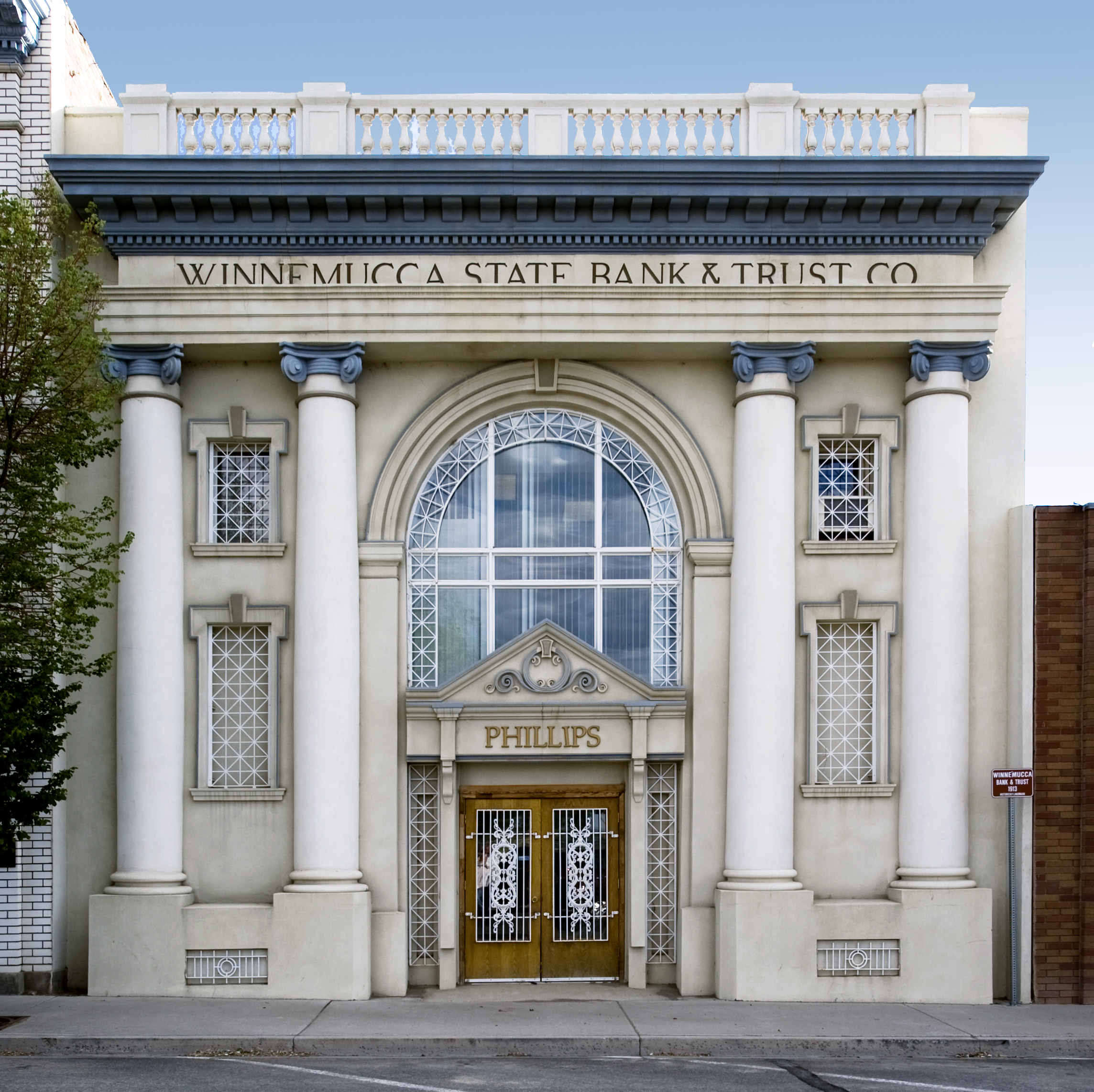
Winnemucca State Bank and Trust building is listed on the National Register of Historic Places.

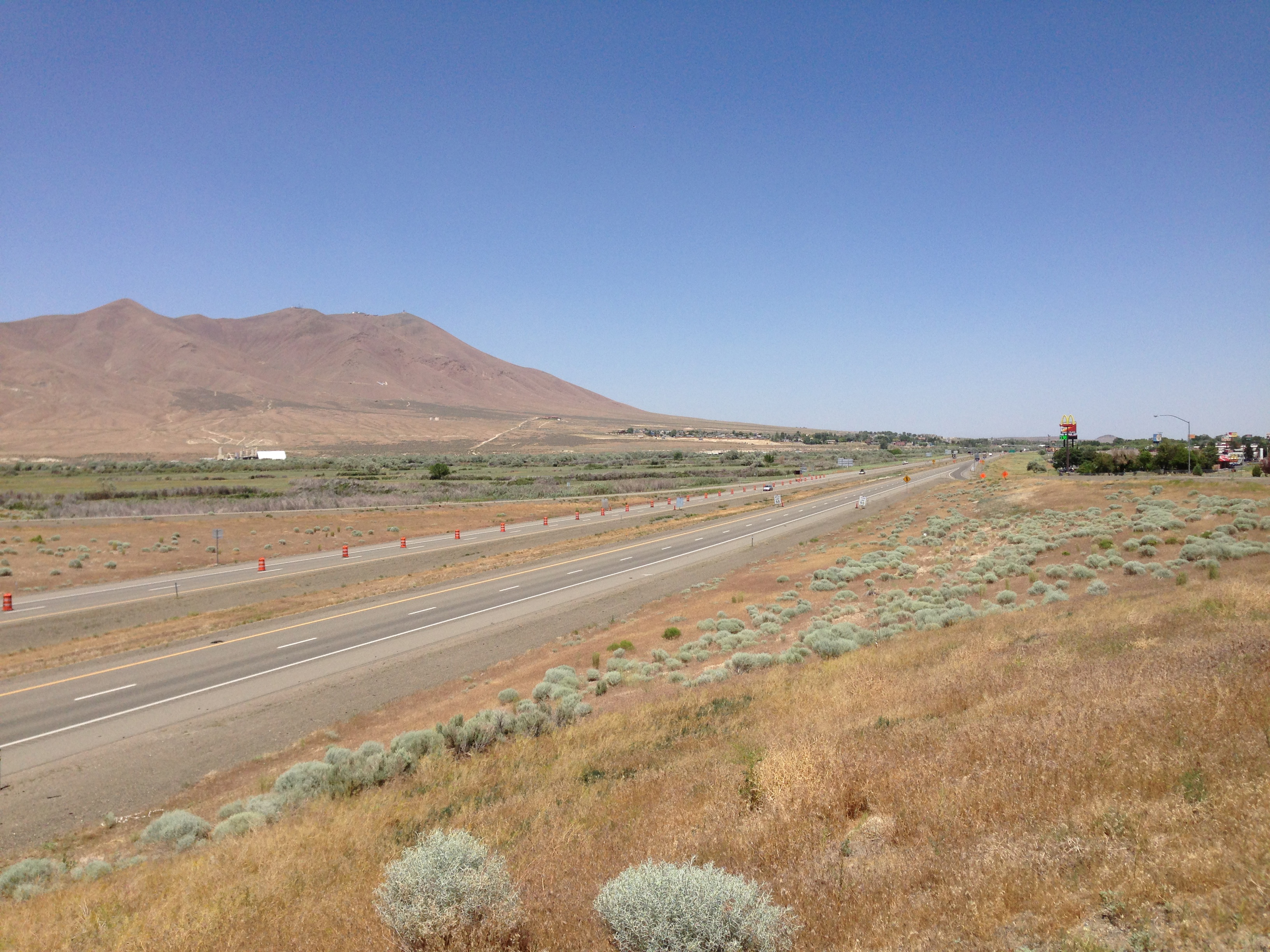
Interstate 80 in Winnemucca

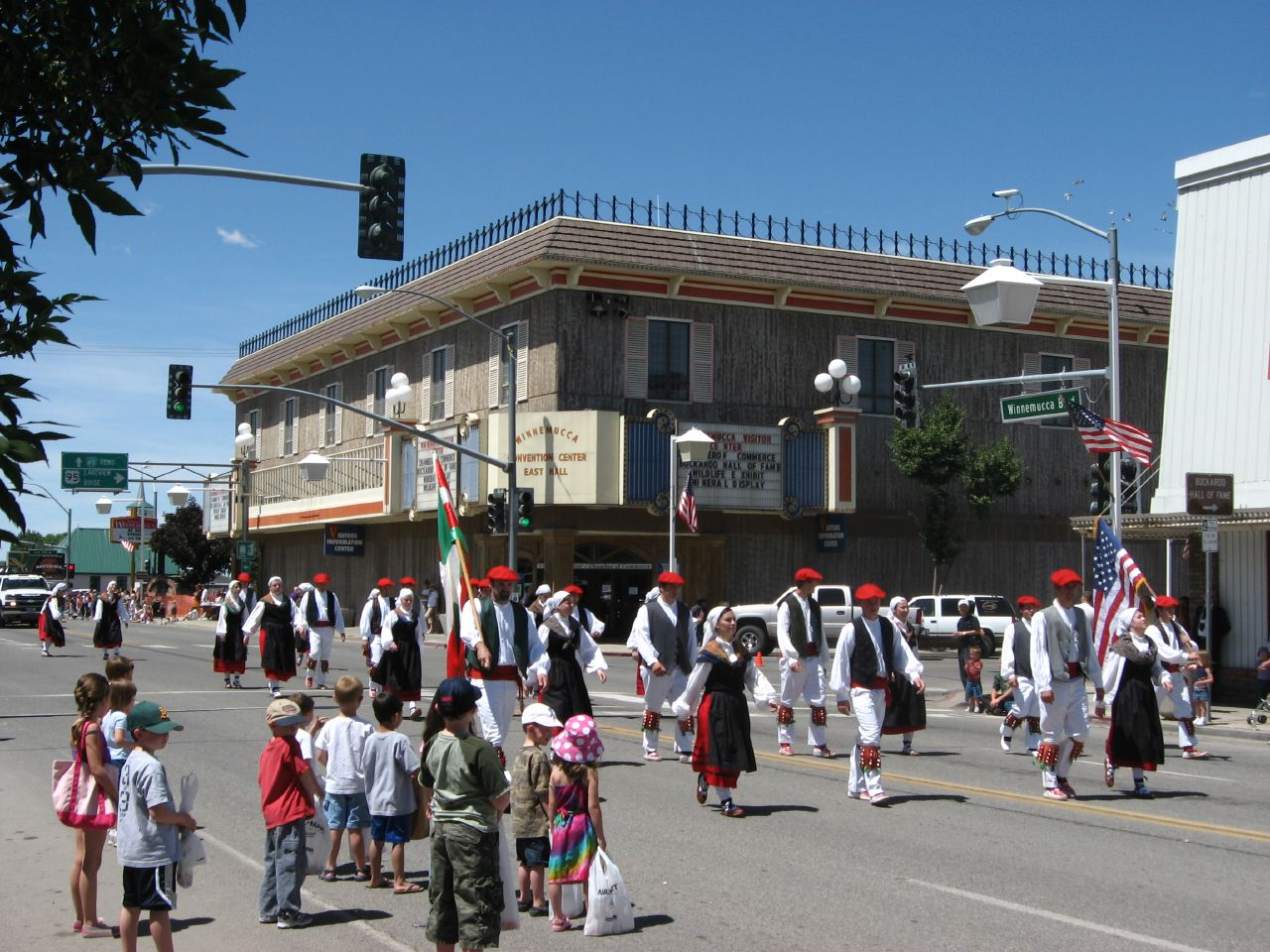
Winnemucca Basque Festival

Amtrak, the national passenger rail system, provides service to Winnemucca. The California Zephyr provides a daily service in both directions between San Francisco and Chicago. The Winnemucca passenger rail station, at 209 West Railroad Street, is now unstaffed. Amtrak tickets for railway transportation in Winnemucca can be purchased online.

Historically, since 1867, Winnemucca has been a station on the Transcontinental Railroad.

Winnemucca is near the half-way point between Salt Lake City and San Francisco along Interstate 80, which passes through town. US Route 95 also goes through Winnemucca.

Local aviation needs are served by the Winnemucca Municipal Airport, located about 5 miles southwest of downtown. There are no scheduled passenger services. The closest commercial airports are Reno–Tahoe International Airport in Reno and Elko Regional Airport in Elko.

== Media ==
The Great Basin Sun, the area newspaper, is published weekly.

Nomadic Broadcasting operates radio station KHYX-FM with a 50,000 watt signal on 102.7 FM and Translator K232BK on 94.3 FM, serving Winnemucca and its outlying communities. 102.7 is an adult contemporary format while 94.3 is a rock format. These two signals are HD.

Buckaroo Broadcasting operates radio station KWNA-FM with a 25,000 watt signal and a country format.

== Employment ==
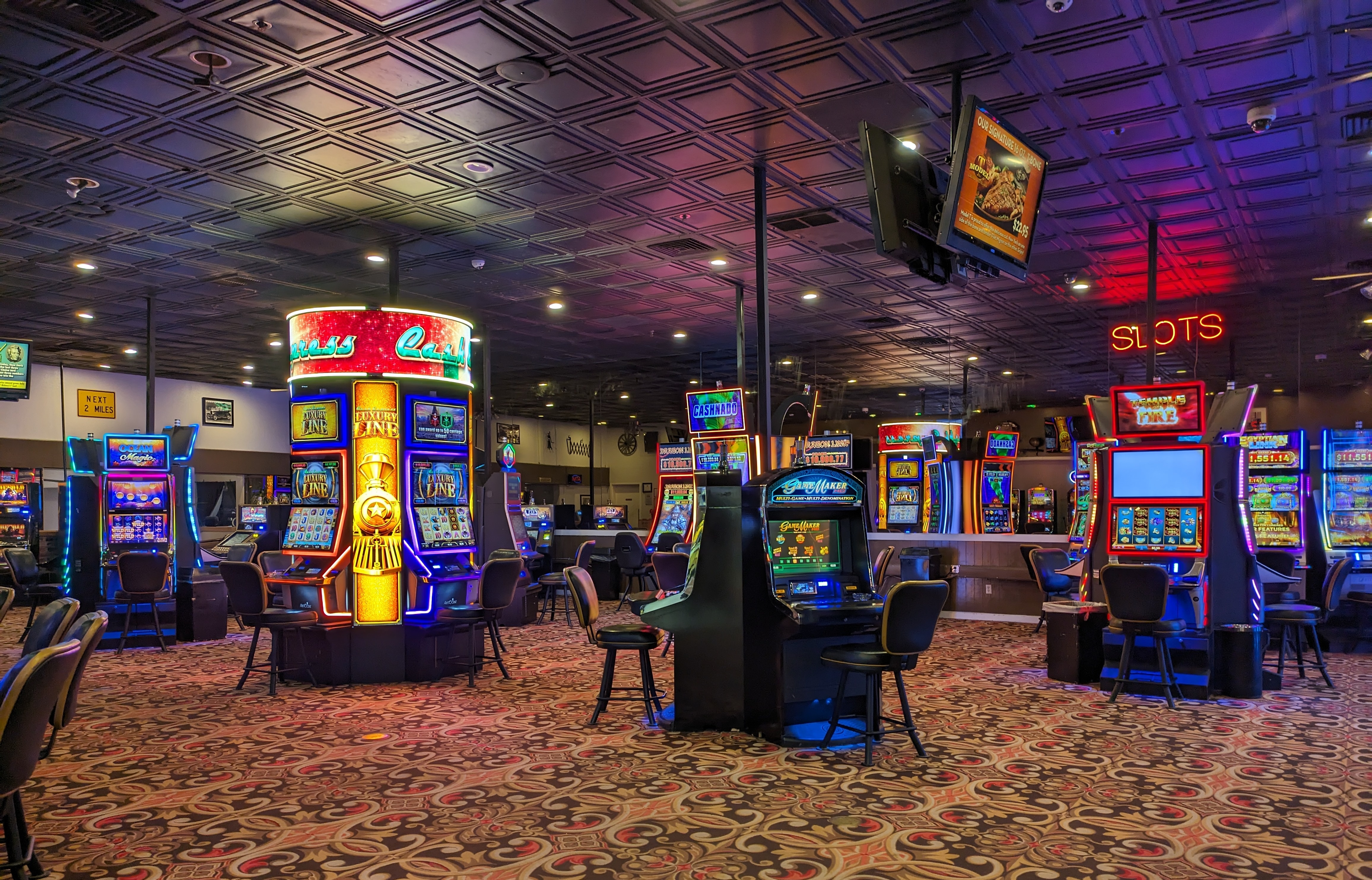
A casino in Winnemucca

Many of Winnemucca's residents are employed by large mining companies such as Newmont and Barrick Gold and by many companies servicing the gold mining industry. Carry-On Trailers employs over 100 residents at their manufacturing facility in the Airport Industrial Park. Winnemucca also has a decent and growing Nevada tourism base. Other area employers include Winnemucca Farms, casinos, hotels, motels and restaurants located in the city. Until 2013, Winnemucca Farms operated the world's largest potato dehydration plant. The Winnemucca area is still one of the largest potato farming areas in the world.

== Education ==
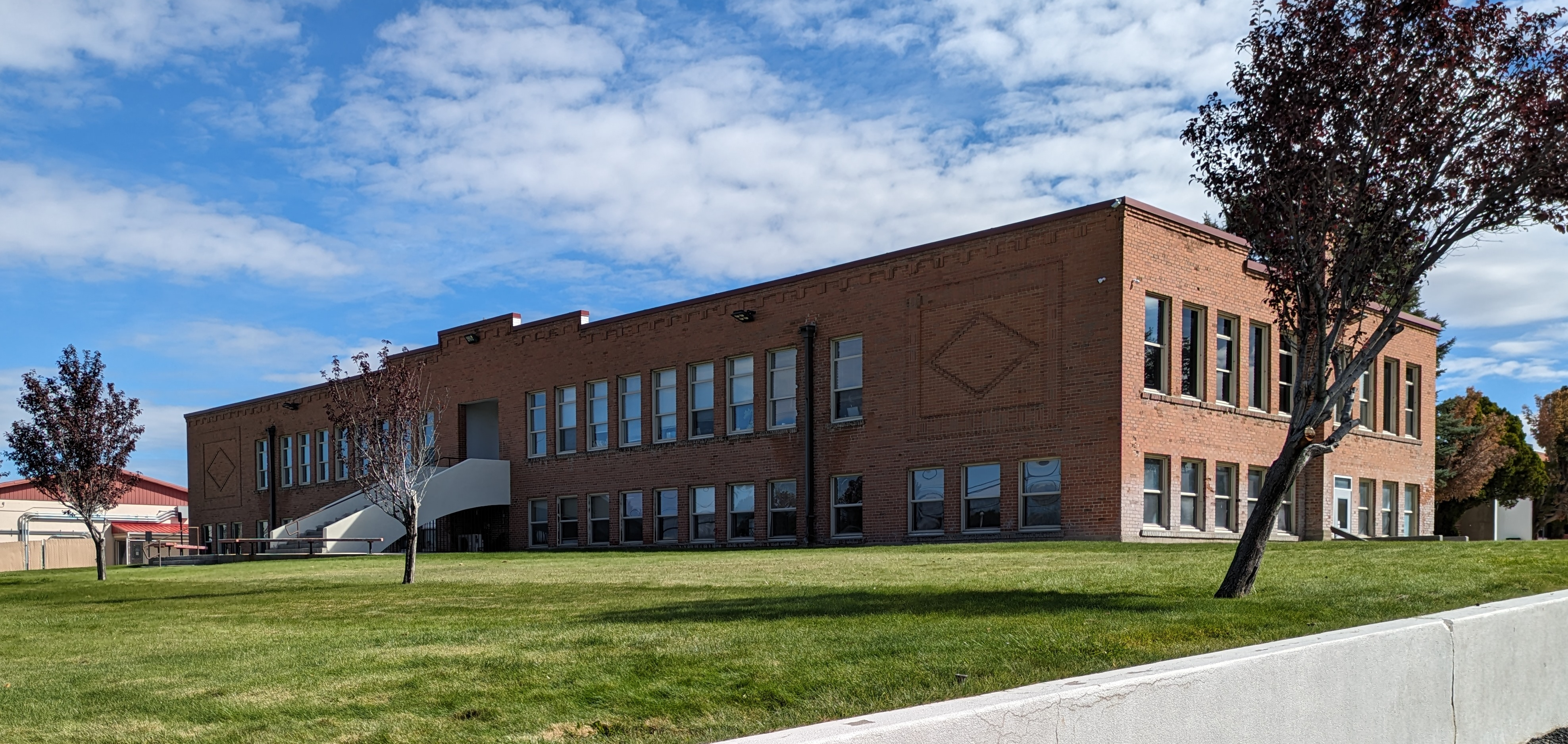
Humboldt County School District headquarters

Humboldt County School District operates the area schools serving Winnemucca.

Three K-4 elementary schools, Grass Valley, Sonoma Heights, and Winnemucca Grammar School serve Winnemucca. All of Winnemucca is zoned to French Ford Middle School (5–6), Winnemucca Junior High School (7–8), and Albert M. Lowry High School (9–12). Lowry High's mascot is the Buckaroos.

Winnemucca has a public library, a branch of the Humboldt County Library.

Humboldt County is in the service area of Great Basin College. That college maintains the GBC Center in Winnemucca.

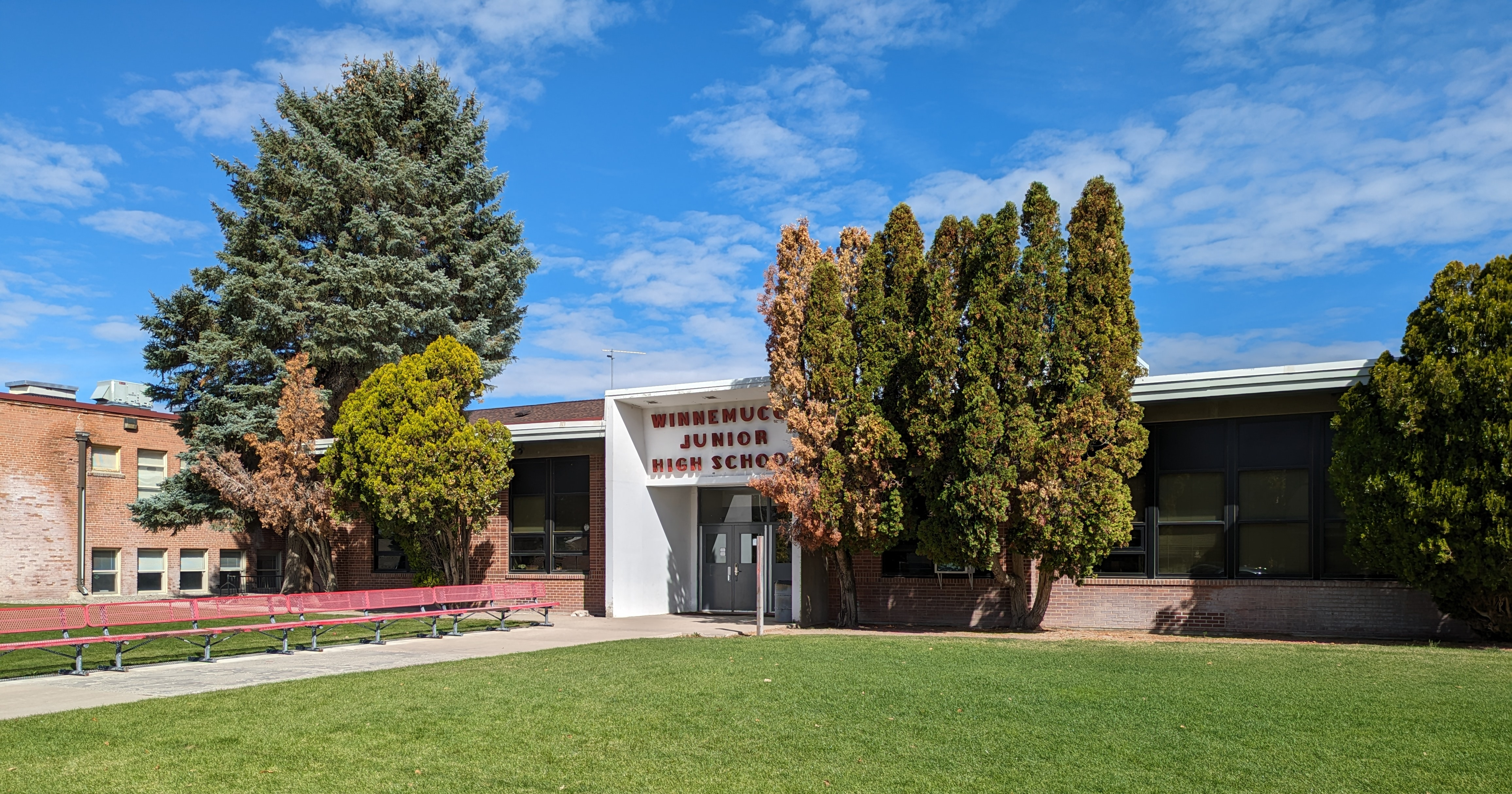
Winnemucca Junior High School

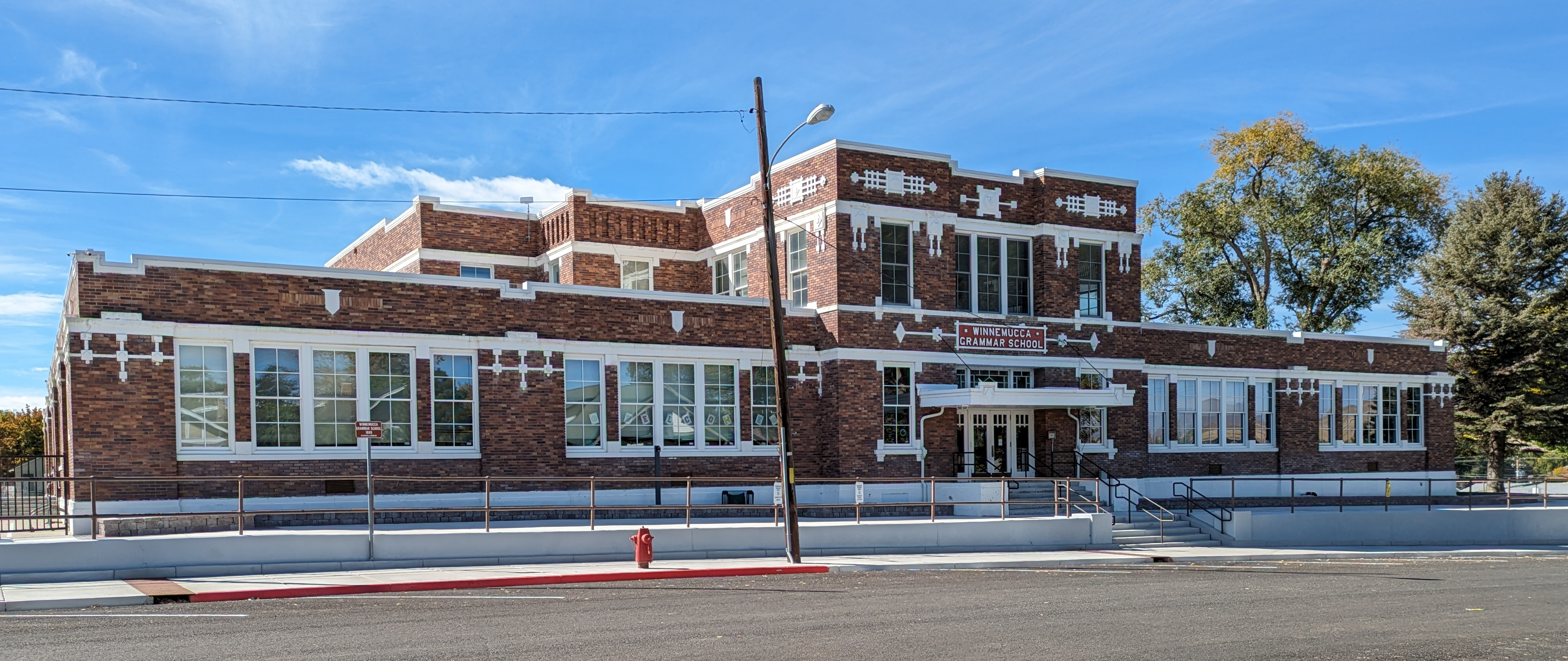
Winnemucca Grammar School

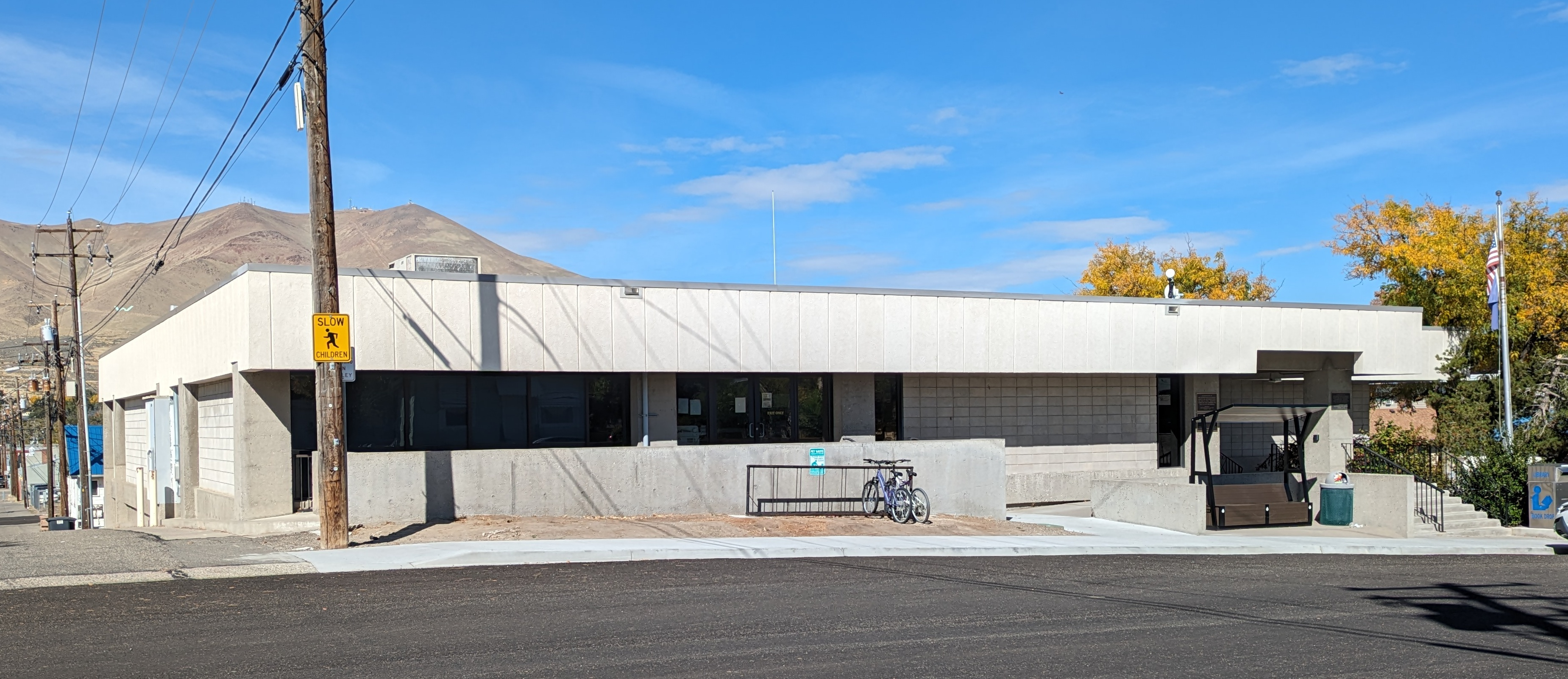
Humboldt County Library

== Notable people ==
- Vernon Alley, jazz musician
- Sharron Angle, member of the Nevada Assembly; academic
- Henry F. Ashurst, United States Senator (Arizona)
- Mario Bautista, UFC fighter
- Howard P. Becker, sociology professor
- Bill Berry, basketball coach
- Jace Billingsley, American football
- Frances Hawkins (1921–2001), teacher and member of the Nevada State Assembly
- George S. Nixon, United States Senator (Nevada)
- Lute Pease, cartoonist
- Bob Tallman, rodeo announcer
- Ralph V. Whitworth, businessman and philanthropist

== In popular culture ==
Winnemucca is also a setting in two Tales of the City novels – More Tales of the City and The Days of Anna Madrigal, a series of nine novels by American author Armistead Maupin. Over 6 million copies of the novels have been sold worldwide. A character in the series, Mother Mucca, takes her nickname from the town. The series began as a newspaper column in the Pacific Sun in 1975, before moving to the San Francisco Chronicle. It features some of the first positive portrayals of gay, lesbian, bisexual and transgender lives. Anna Madrigal, a transgender character, was depicted as having been born as Andy Ramsey in Winnemucca, Nevada. The series was made into a TV series with the character of Anna Madrigal played by Olympia Dukakis.

In 2021, the town once again caught the attention of Armistead Maupin, after an article in the Nevada Independent News wrote about Winnemucca Pride - a planned LGBTQ pride parade and festival being planned by Winnemucca residents Shawn Dixon, Kat Dixon, Christina Basso and Misty Huff. The article prompted Maupin to write "This story is inspirational on so many levels! I stand in awe of these women."

Rod McKuen's poem "Winnemucca, Nevada", in his book Come to Me in Silence, describes his first desk in school.

The town serves as the namesake for the alternative country band Richmond Fontaine's 2002 album, Winnemucca; the album prominently features the town in the opening track "Winner's Casino".

Winnemucca is cited in the preamble to the North American version of the song "I've Been Everywhere."
