= Numbers Fire =

2020 wildfire in Nevada, United States

- Part of the 2020 Nevada wildfires
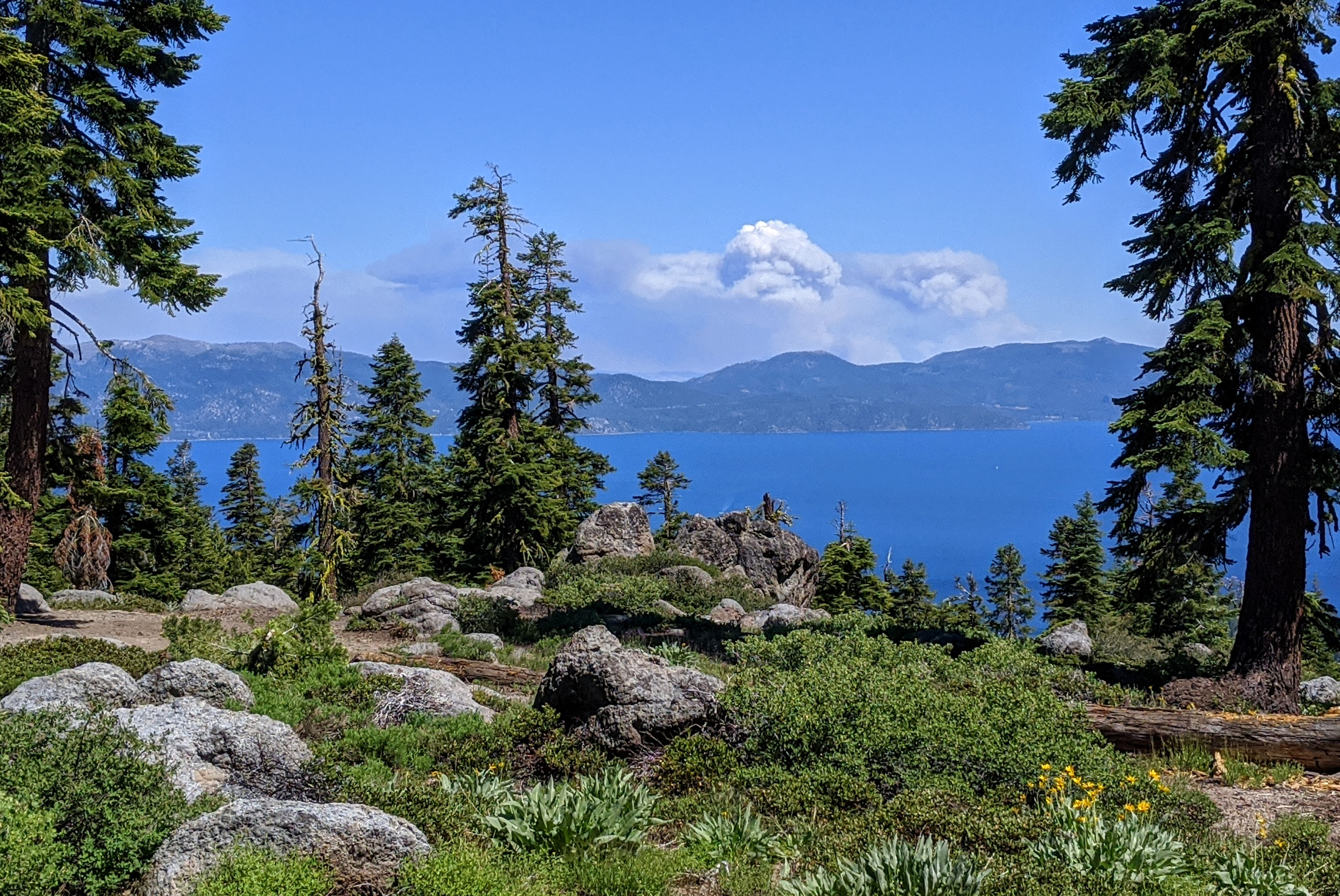
- The Numbers Fire plume from Mount Watson
- Date: July 6, 2020–July 14, 2020
- Location: Pine Nut Mountains, Douglas County, Nevada, United States
- Coordinates: 38.843°N 119.639°W

Statistics
- Burned area: 18,380 acres (7,438 ha)

Impacts
- Structures lost: 3 homes & 37 outbuildings near Pine View Estates; 6 homes & multiple outbuildings on private land & 4 homes & multiple outbuildings on BIA land off of Pinenut Rd #2

Ignition
- Cause: Semi-tractor trailer truck mechanical issues

Map
- Location in Nevada

The Numbers Fire was a wildfire that burned in the Pine Nut Mountains, near Gardnerville, Nevada, in the United States. The fire was reported on July 6, 2020, and burned 18,342 acres (7,423 ha). It was contained on July 14, 2020. The fire threatened the communities of Ruhenstroth, Pine View Estates and Bodie Flats, totaling approximately 1,000 homes. It resulted in the mandatory evacuations of Pine View Estates and Bodie Flats and the closure of a 15-mile stretch of Highway 395. Forty structures were destroyed, including three homes. The fire was started by a truck with mechanical issues which discharged particles which ignited the fire.

== Events ==
The Numbers Fire was first reported burning 10 miles southeast of Gardnerville, Nevada in the Pine Nut Mountains on July 6, 2020, at approximately 7 PM. Originally three separate fires, the fires grew together rapidly and caused immediate mandatory evacuations of Pine View Estates and Bodie Flats. An evacuation center was opened at the Carson Valley Inn. The fire moved north, causing the closure of Pinenut Road. By 9:30 pm, the fire had jumped Highway 395 and was burning on both sides of the highway. The highway was closed in both directions from SR208 Holbrook Junction and Riverview Road south 15 miles to Topaz Lake, Nevada. Community members in Ruhenstroth, Nevada were asked to prepare in case evacuation orders were put in place.

The next morning, July 7, the Numbers Fire had burned over 4,500 acres (1,821 ha). Power was shut off in the evacuated areas by NV Energy. Officials announced that one home and 10 outbuildings were destroyed. Additional evacuation centers were opened at the Holiday Inn Express and Douglas County Animal Shelter and Douglas County Fairgrounds began accepting animal evacuees. Blue Bird and Lena Way were placed under mandatory evacuation. Governor Steve Sisolak requested FEMA disaster funds to support residents impacted by the Numbers Fire. The funds were approved that day. By the evening of July 7, the fire had exploded to 18,000 acres (7,284 ha) and remained at zero containment. Evacuations were lifted for Bodie Flat and Pine View Estates.

The following day, July 8, the fire was five percent contained. Evacuations were lifted for Out Our Way and Blue Bird. Highway 395 was opened the next day. More structures were reported destroyed, bringing the total to three homes and 37 outbuildings.

As of July 13, the fire had burned 18,342 acres (7,423 ha) and was 98 percent contained. The cause of the fire was determined to be from a truck having a mechanical problem.

== Current closures and evacuations ==
The following roads are closed as of July 10:

- Pinenut Road (residents may access with valid ID)
- Blossom Canyon Road (residents may access with valid ID)

== Impact ==
At its height, the fire threatened an estimated 1,000 homes. The first night of the fire, July 6, the neighborhoods of Bodie Flats and Pine View Estates were evacuated. Residents were allowed to return the evening of July 7. Power was shut off for over 500 customers starting July 7. Out our Way Area, Blue Bird and Lena Way were evacuated July 7. Three homes and 37 outbuildings were destroyed. For the first two days, Douglas County officials avoided using the Douglas County Community and Senior Center as evacuation centers due to COVID-19. Instead, they use hotels.

The fire caused the closure of Pinenut Road and Highway 395 on July 6. Highway 395 was closed from SR208 Holbrook Junction to Riverview Road. Highway 395 was reopened on July 8 after transportation officials replaced a mile long guardrail that had been burned.

The fire threatened a colony of bi-state sage grouse.

Air quality was impacted in Carson Valley, Nevada due to the fire. By July 7, the air quality was at an unhealthy 109. A visible layer of smoke hovered over the valley. Large plumes of smoke were visible from Alpine Meadows, California and Reno, Nevada.

Of the total acreage burned, 6,545 acres (2,649 ha) were Bureau of Land Management land, 5,833 acres (2,361 ha) Bureau of Indian Affairs land, and 5,964 acres (2,414 ha) was private land.

== Investigation ==
Starting July 8, officials began asking members of the public to send any information regarding activities they may have seen while traveling on US 395 between Ridge View and Holbrook Junction between 6:30 and 7:30 PM on July 6. On July 9, California Highway Patrol began looking for a vehicle that may have caused the fire.

Investigators with the East Fork Fire Protection District, the Douglas County Sheriff's Office, the Bureau of Land Management, and the USDA Forest Service worked together to determine the origin and cause of these fires. Investigators gathered physical evidence that indicated a semi-tractor trailer truck, while operating southbound on Highway 395, most likely experienced a failure in its exhaust system. This possible failure allowed hot particles to be discharged along the highway right-of-way, igniting dry grass and brush.

== See also ==
- 2020 Nevada wildfires
- Monarch Fire
