= Monarch Fire =

2020 wildfire in Nevada, United States

- Part of the 2020 Nevada wildfires
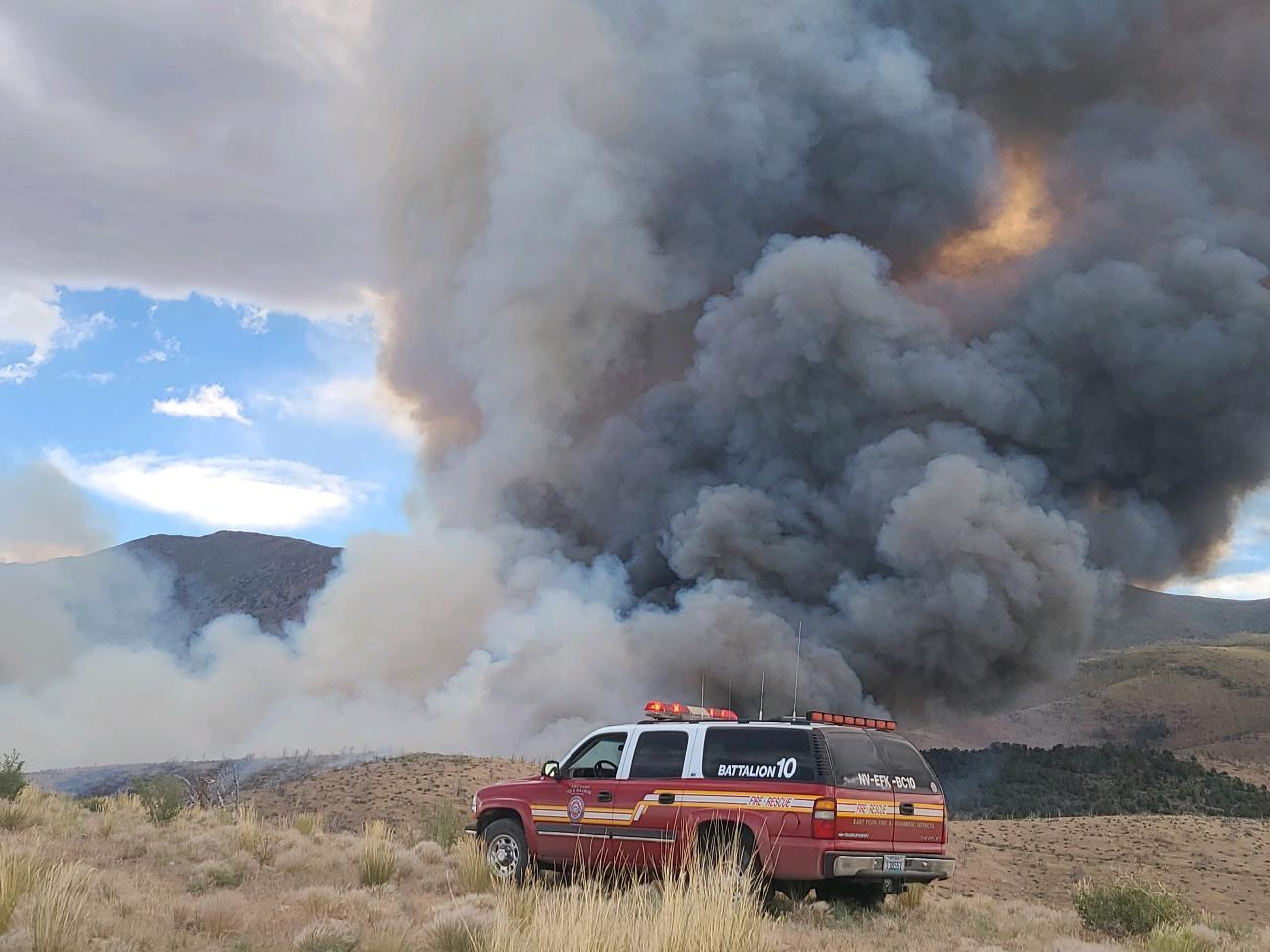
- Monarch Fire on June 27, 2020
- Date: June 24, 2020–
- Location: Douglas County, Nevada, United States
- Coordinates: 38.878°N 119.563°W

Statistics
- Burned area: 2,324 acres (940 ha)

Impacts
- Cost: $931,000

Ignition
- Cause: Lightning strike

Map
- Location in Nevada

The Monarch Fire was a wildfire burning three miles south of Sierra Spirit Ranch in Douglas County, Nevada, in the United States. The fire, which was reported on June 24, 2020, was started by a lightning strike. As of June 28, 2020, it has burned 2,324 acres (940 ha) and was 97 percent contained. The fire is the largest of a handful that resulted after thunderstorms moved through the area.

== Events ==
The Monarch Fire was reported burning three miles south of Sierra Spirit Ranch on Bureau of Land Management land on June 24, 2020 around 12:41 PM. The fire was started by a lightning strike and was named due to its proximity to the Monarch Mine. The mine is located between Galena Peak and Sugar Loaf. Fueled by grass and pinyon-juniper, by 4:12 PM the fire had burned 800 acres (324 ha) and was moving east. One hour later, the fire had doubled to 1,600 acres (647 ha). Lena Lane and Pine Nut Road 2 were closed only to fire crews and residents. Pine Nut Road 2 was reopened on June 27.

As of June 28, 2020, the fire had burned 2,324 acres (940 ha) and was 97 percent contained with full containment expected by June 29, 2020.

== Impact ==
The fire led to Pinenut Road 2 and Lena Lane being closed only to fire crews. Smoke from the fire was visible from Carson City, Nevada. As of June 27, 2020, the fire cost $931,000 to fight.

== Gallery ==
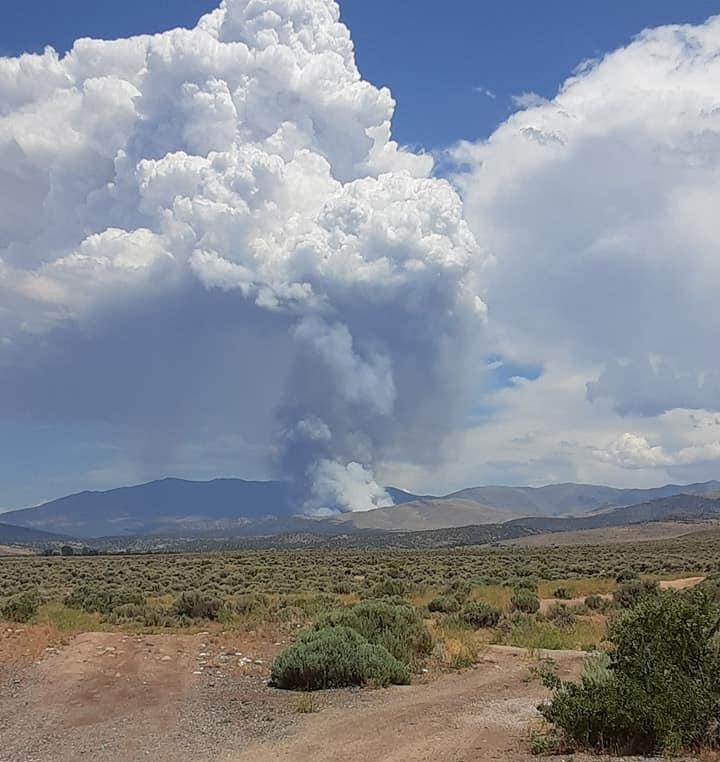
Fire on June 25, 2020

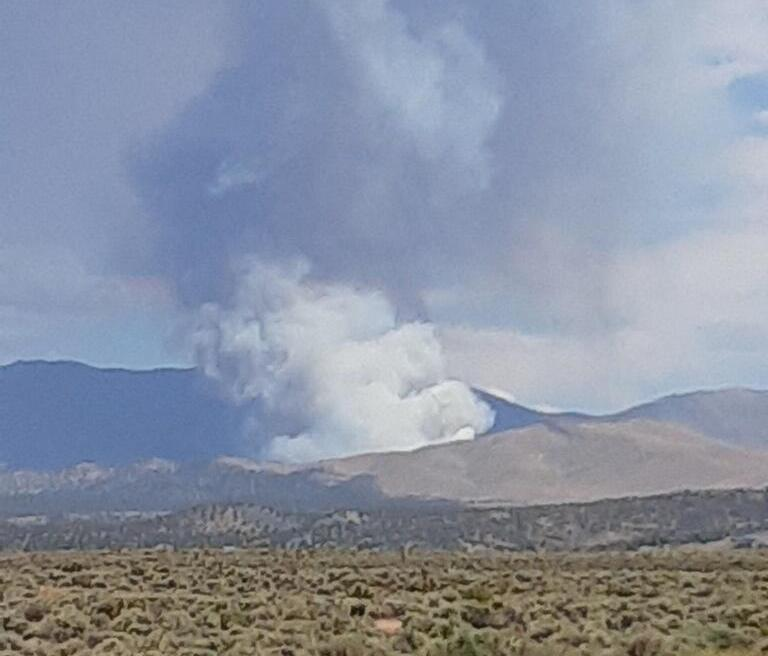
Fire on June 26, 2020

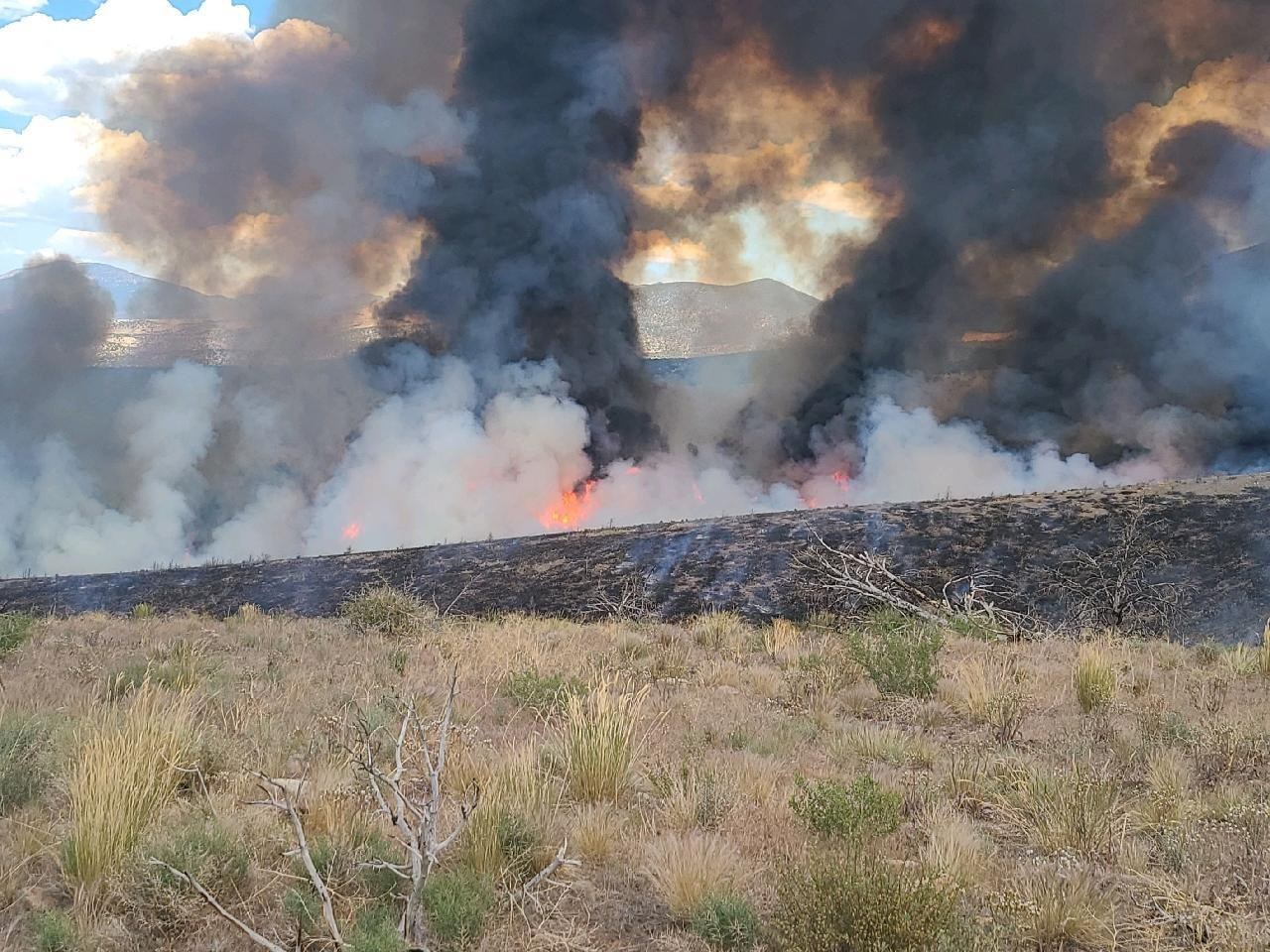
Fire on June 27, 2020

== See also ==
- 2020 Nevada wildfires
- Numbers Fire
