= 2026 Tuolumne County wildfires =

Wildfires in Tuolumne County, California during 2026

2026 Tuolumne County wildfires is a summary of notable wildfires in Tuolumne County, California during 2026. The county is protected by CAL FIRE's Tuolumne-Calaveras Unit (TCU), which covers over one million acres of State Responsibility Area across Calaveras, eastern San Joaquin, eastern Stanislaus, and Tuolumne counties.

== Background ==
The typical fire season in Tuolumne County runs from late spring through early fall, when vegetation in the Sierra Nevada foothills is at its driest. The county encompasses portions of the Stanislaus National Forest and shares a border with Yosemite National Park. The Gold Rush-era communities of Groveland, Chinese Camp, and Jamestown sit in fire-prone oak woodland and chaparral at lower elevations.

In September 2025, a series of thunderstorms produced more than 10,000 lightning strikes across Northern California, igniting the TCU September Lightning Complex across Tuolumne, Calaveras, Stanislaus, and San Joaquin counties. The complex burned 13,869 acres and destroyed 95 structures — 45 of them homes, concentrated around Chinese Camp — and damaged seven more. The largest fire in the complex, the 6-5 Fire, burned through the historic community of Chinese Camp. Several landmarks including the town's historic church and post office survived the blaze. All fires in the complex were fully contained by September 13, 2025.

Debris removal from the 6-5 Fire was completed in early March 2026, allowing property owners to begin the rebuilding process.

== List of wildfires ==
The following is a list of fires that burned more than 10 acres, produced significant structural damage, or were otherwise notable in Tuolumne County during 2026.

Name	Location	Acres	Start date	Containment date	Notes	References
Twist	Near Chinese Camp	27	May 23	May 24	Cause under investigation. Burned near intersection of Twist Road and Jacksonville Road, approximately 2.5 miles east of Chinese Camp. Jacksonville Road temporarily closed.	
Avenida	Don Pedro, Avenida Central	53	June 2	June 3	Cause under investigation. Burned near Avenida Central in the Don Pedro area. Forward progress stopped by aggressive initial attack.	
Owl	Highway 108, Green Springs	120	June 30	July 1	Ignited at 3:12 AM along Highway 108 near Green Springs. Peaked at 120 acres by 11:47 AM with forward progress stopped by coordinated air and ground attack at 12:34 PM. Fully contained July 1, 2026. Cause under investigation.	

== See also ==
- TCU September Lightning Complex
- 2026 California wildfires
- Stanislaus National Forest
- Wildfires in Tuolumne County, California
