= Serica prava =

Scientific classification
- Kingdom: Animalia
- Phylum: Arthropoda
- Class: Insecta
- Order: Coleoptera
- Suborder: Polyphaga
- Infraorder: Scarabaeiformia
- Family: Scarabaeidae
- Genus: Serica
- Species: S. prava

Binomial name
- Serica prava Dawson, 1933

Species of beetle

Serica prava is a species of beetle of the family Scarabaeidae. It is found in the United States (California).

== Description ==
Adults reach a length of about 8 mm. The colour is brown (chestnut to auburn). The surface is subopaque and faintly iridescent.

== Life history ==
Adults have been recorded feeding on Adenostoma fasciculatum, flowers of Eriogonum fasciculatum and flowers of Adenostoma sparsifolium.
