= Behested payment =

A behested payment is a charitable donation made at the suggestion or request of an elected official. For example, if an elected official works with a non-profit organization to send fundraising letters with the official's name and signature, in the hope of raising money for the charity, then any donations made to the charity in response to those letters are behested payments. It is legal for elected officials to raise money for governmental, legislative, and charitable purposes, and many of them do so.

The word behested means ordered or earnestly requested. Behested payments are different from campaign contributions and from personal gifts to politicians, although it is possible under some circumstances for a payment to meet the definition of both a behested payment and also a gift. Under California law, elected officials must report behested payments of $5,000 or more. The purpose of disclosure is to improve trust by letting taxpayers know if a business or person is trying to curry favor with a politician by making charitable donations.

== Examples ==
Examples of behested payments include:

- Donations solicited by a mayor to local charities that support city projects, e.g., beautification projects.
- Donations solicited by the then-California governor, Arnold Schwarzenegger to pay for after-school programs.
- Donations solicited by a legislator to buy computers for schools.
- Donations solicited by a district attorney for a nonprofit organization trying to prevent crimes by young people.
- Donations solicited by a school board member for a college scholarship program.
- Donations solicited by charitable organization in a letter that features (with the consent of the elected official) the name and photograph of the elected official.
- Donations solicited by an elected official for an independent non-profit organization that supports government activities, such as a swearing-in ceremony.

Behested payments are generally legitimate donations to legitimate non-profit organizations and government programs. There are no limits on donations to charities and government programs.

== Public reporting requirements ==
The elected official at whose behest the donations are made is not meant to receive any benefit. However, as a practical matter, someone who successfully directs large donations to an organization might have some influence over that organization, as the organization would wish to retain their favor in the future, and thus might be influenced by that person's views on what the organization should do or how it should operate. Also, there may be at least the appearance that the donor might want something in return for the donation. Consequently, under California law, if a single person or entity donates $5,000 or more in one year in response to a request from an elected official, then the donation must be publicly reported within 30 days of when the official learns of the donation being made. For example, after the 2025 California wildfires, California Governor Gavin Newsom solicited donations to help the fire victims, and needed to report $5.5 million in donations to fire-related charities. Non-monetary donations of goods and services are also counted.

Smaller donations are not reported. If the politician is solicits donations from the general public (such as recommending that people consider making a donation to the disaster relief organizations after a fire or other disaster) in a broadcast interview, and the official does not have specific knowledge of any particular donation being made, then the donations do not need to be reported.

Since 2020, California elected officials have reported a total of about $40 million in behested payments per year. In 2020, because of the COVID-19 pandemic, elected officials in California reported $237 million in behested payments, much of it to support pandemic needs in California related to health and homelessness. Nearly all of that was reported as behested payments solicited by the California governor, Gavin Newsom.

Officials who are required to report these donations can be fined if they fail to report the donations on time.

The political watchdog group Common Cause has criticized allowing politicians to solicit donations for even legitimate non-profit organizations. However, others support making genuine charitable organizations.

== See also ==
- Political action committee – political organization that is not required to disclose anything about its donors
- Independent expenditure group – political campaign that advocates for the election or defeat of a political candidate
