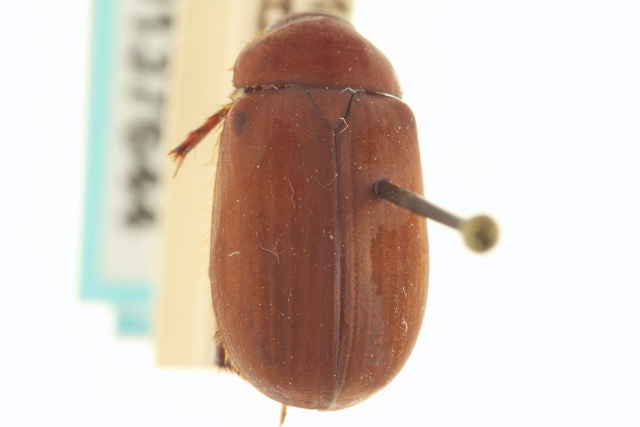

Scientific classification
- Kingdom: Animalia
- Phylum: Arthropoda
- Class: Insecta
- Order: Coleoptera
- Suborder: Polyphaga
- Infraorder: Scarabaeiformia
- Family: Scarabaeidae
- Genus: Serica
- Species: S. satrapa

Binomial name
- Serica satrapa Dawson, 1947

= Serica satrapa =

Species of beetle

Serica satrapa is a species of beetle of the family Scarabaeidae. It is found in the United States (California).

== Description ==
Adults reach a length of about 10 mm. Adults are similar to Serica fimbriata, but the colour averages a little lighter and more fulvous than chestnut. Furthermore, the opacity is not so dense and the hairs are slightly finer and slightly lighter in colour.
