= TCU September Lightning Complex =

2025 wildfire in California

TCU Lightning Complex
- Part of the 2025 California wildfires
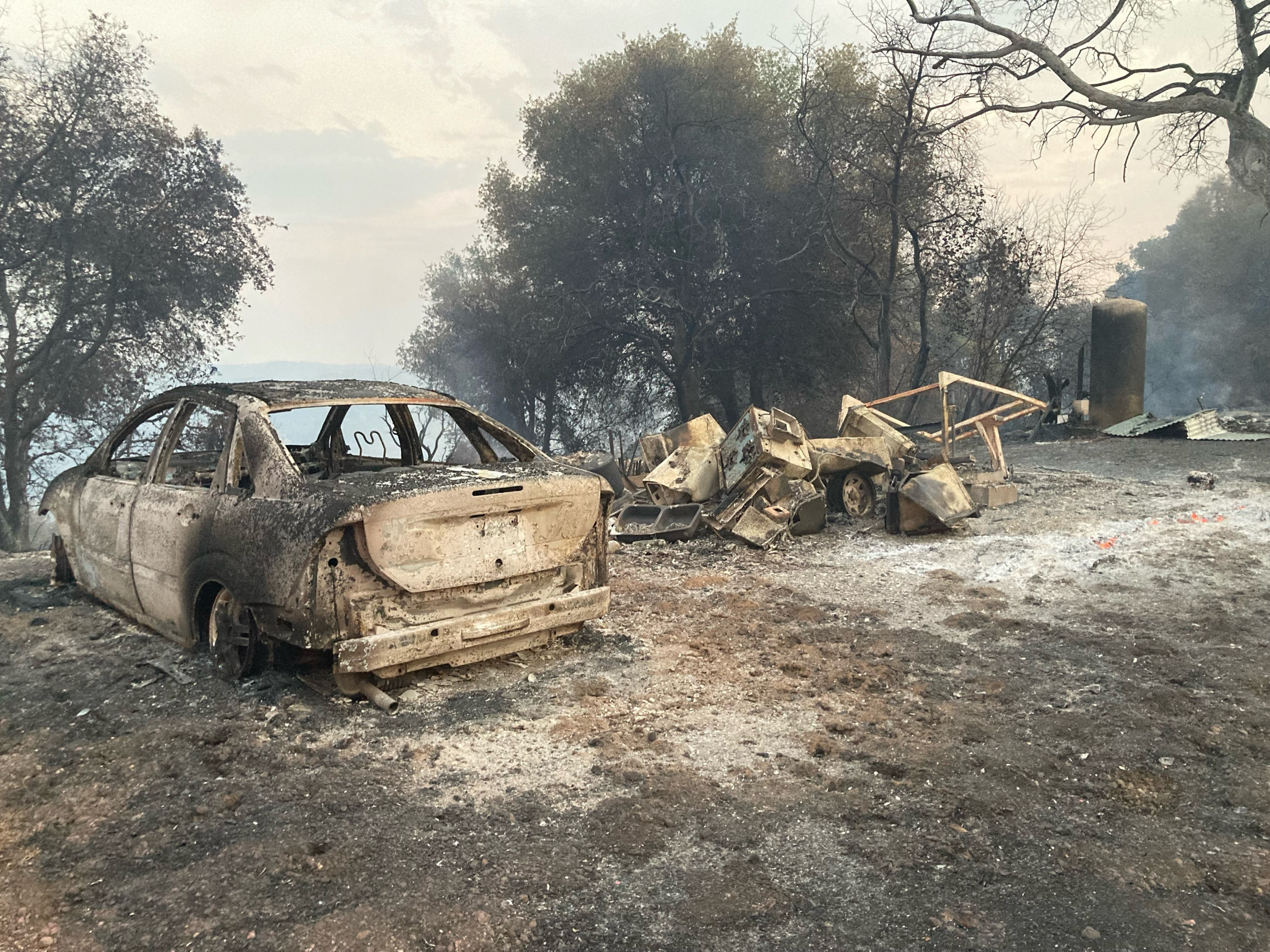
- Vehicles burned out in the aftermath of the TCU September Lightning Complex fire, September 2, 2025.
- Date: September 2, 2025 – September 13, 2025
- Location: Tuolumne County, California, Calaveras County, California, Stanislaus County, California, San Joaquin County, California
- Coordinates: 37.9985°N 120.4751°W

Statistics
- Burned area: 13,869 acres (5,613 ha)

Impacts
- Injuries: 1 firefighter
- Structures destroyed: 95 destroyed, 7 Damaged

Ignition
- Cause: Lightning

The TCU September Lightning Complex Fire was a series of wildfires that burned in Tuolumne County, California, Calaveras County, California, Stanislaus County, California, and San Joaquin County, California. On September 13, the fire was fully contained at 13,869 acres (5,613 ha). It is the third largest wildfire in California during the 2025 wildfire season.

== Background ==
The TCU September Lightning Complex ignited after a series of widespread thunderstorms brought more than 10,000 lightning strikes across Northern California in late August and early September 2025. Rising daytime temperatures in the upper 80s to low 90s °F, combined with gusty afternoon winds and critically low relative humidity, created rapid fire spread conditions. A series of red flag warnings were issued by the National Weather Service for the Sierra Nevada foothills during the event. "TCU" refers to the Tuolumne-Calaveras unit, the CAL FIRE operational unit assigned to the area.

Persistent drought in the Sierra Nevada region compounded the risk. According to CAL FIRE’s statewide seasonal report, rainfall totals since the previous winter had fallen to less than 65 percent of normal, leaving live fuel and dead fuel moisture at critically low levels. Drying oak woodlands and thick grass loads provided ample fuel, while limited overnight humidity recovery allowed the fire to remain active through multiple burning periods.

== Progression ==
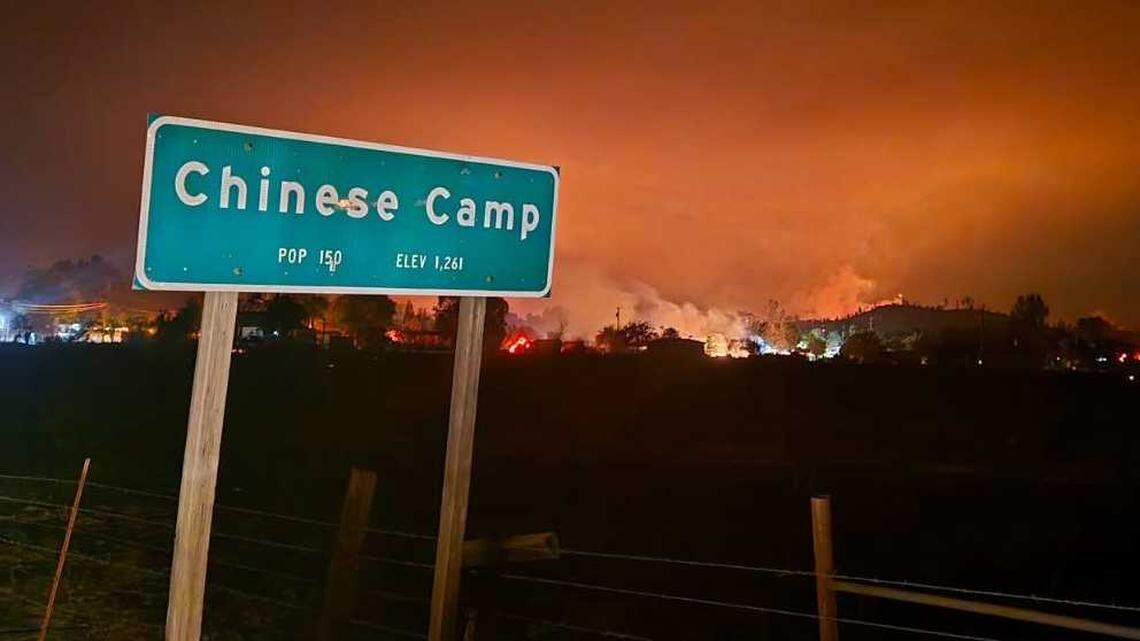
TCU September Lightning Complex fire burning in Chinese Camp, California on September 3, 2025.

The TCU September Lightning Complex was first reported during the morning of September 2, 2025. A series of fires were ignited across Calaveras, Tuolumne, Stanislaus and San Joaquin Counties. The largest and most damaging fire, the “6-5” fire near Chinese Camp, California in Tuolumne County was discovered midday after multiple thunderstorms cells passed through Tuolumne County. Additional large fires within the complex consisted of the “2-2” fire east of Farmington in Stanislaus County, the “2-3” fire near Copperopolis in Calaveras County, the “2-7” fire near Murphys in Calaveras County, the “2-8” fire near Copperopolis in Calaveras County, and the “6-2” fire near Chinese Camp in Tuolumne County. In total 21 fires were ignited during the day of September 2, which overwhelmed the units initial attack resources. Additional resources from outside the unit and region responded to assist with the suppression of the fires within the complex. The cause of all fires in the complex was attributed to lightning from a widespread thunderstorm outbreak that ignited multiple fires across the Sierra Nevada foothills.

Within its first operational period, the complex had grown to more than 2,000 acres, driven by hot temperatures, low humidity, and erratic winds. By the morning of September 3, it had expanded to over 13,700 acres with containment at 15 percent.

The “6-5” fire advanced rapidly through the historic town of Chinese Camp, destroying and damaging numerous structures before firefighters were able to establish control lines around the community. Spot fires ignited ahead of the main front, forcing road closures along California State Route 49 and California State Route 120.

By September 4, the complex was still active, and containment efforts were underway on all active fires; mop-up was ongoing where containment lines had been established. At that time it was approximately 13,790 acres in size with about 15% containment.

Over the following days, firefighting crews expanded control lines, continued mop-up operations, and monitored weather and fire behavior.

As of September 13, 2025, the TCU September Lightning Complex has been declared 100% contained, with a final acreage of 13,869 acres. All individual fires in the complex are fully contained.

== Effects ==
Mandatory evacuations displaced residents in and around Chinese Camp, California. The “6-5” blaze destroyed dozens of homes and damaged historic structures in the Gold Rush–era town, though landmarks such as the 1854 church, post office, and Chinese Camp Store were spared. Additional evacuations occurred in the communities of Vallecito and Murphys in Calaveras County when the “2-7” threatened those towns and residences surrounding them.

One firefighter was injured when a fire engine was overturned near the fire, and he was brought to a local medical facility. His condition was not immediately disclosed.

The fire prompted the closure of California State Route 49 near Chinese Camp and portions of California State Route 120, as well as the shutdown of multiple local roads in Tuolumne County. Evacuation orders were issued by CAL FIRE for several zones in Tuolumne and Calaveras counties, including areas surrounding Chinese Camp, Moccasin, and parts of Jamestown. Up to 3,000 structures were threatened by the wildfire.

== Growth and containment table ==
Fire containment status Gray: contained; Red: active; %: percent contained;
Date	Area burned	Personnel	Containment
September 2	12,473 acres (50 km^{2})	N/A	
September 3	13,371 acres (54 km^{2})	1,254	
September 4	13,968 acres (57 km^{2})	1,945	
September 5	13,970 acres (57 km^{2})	1,920	
September 6	13,875 acres (56 km^{2})	1,670	
September 7	13,869 acres (56 km^{2})	1,480	
September 8	13,869 acres (56 km^{2})	1,250	
September 9	13,869 acres (56 km^{2})	1,080	
September 10	13,869 acres (56 km^{2})	940	
September 11	13,869 acres (56 km^{2})	720	
September 12	13,869 acres (56 km^{2})	560	
September 13	13,869 acres (56 km^{2})	480	

== Recovery ==
Following the fire, Governor Gavin Newsom proclaimed a state of emergency in Tuolumne County on September 9, 2025, unlocking additional state assistance under the California Disaster Assistance Act. The Governor's Office of Emergency Services partnered with county officials on debris removal and watershed recovery efforts to prevent toxic burn scar debris from contaminating local waterways near the Don Pedro Reservoir.

In Chinese Camp, at least 45 single-family homes, five commercial-residential properties, and 40 smaller buildings were destroyed by the 6-5 Fire. Crews removed approximately 8,866 tons of debris from 51 burned parcels, working six days a week through the winter months. All historic structures and artifacts were documented prior to removal, with some materials including doors, windows, and bricks retained at the request of the Tuolumne County Historic Preservation Review Commission and property owners. Tuolumne County completed debris cleanup operations in March 2026 — within six months of the fire — enabling property owners to begin rebuilding.

In January 2026, a Multi-Agency Resources Center event was held at the Chicken Ranch Casino Resort to assist displaced residents with funding, insurance, and rebuilding services. The Tuolumne County Community Development Department expedited permits to assist fire-affected families in rebuilding as rapidly as possible.

== See also ==
- 2025 United States wildfires
- List of California wildfires
- 2025 California wildfires
