= 2025 California wildfires =

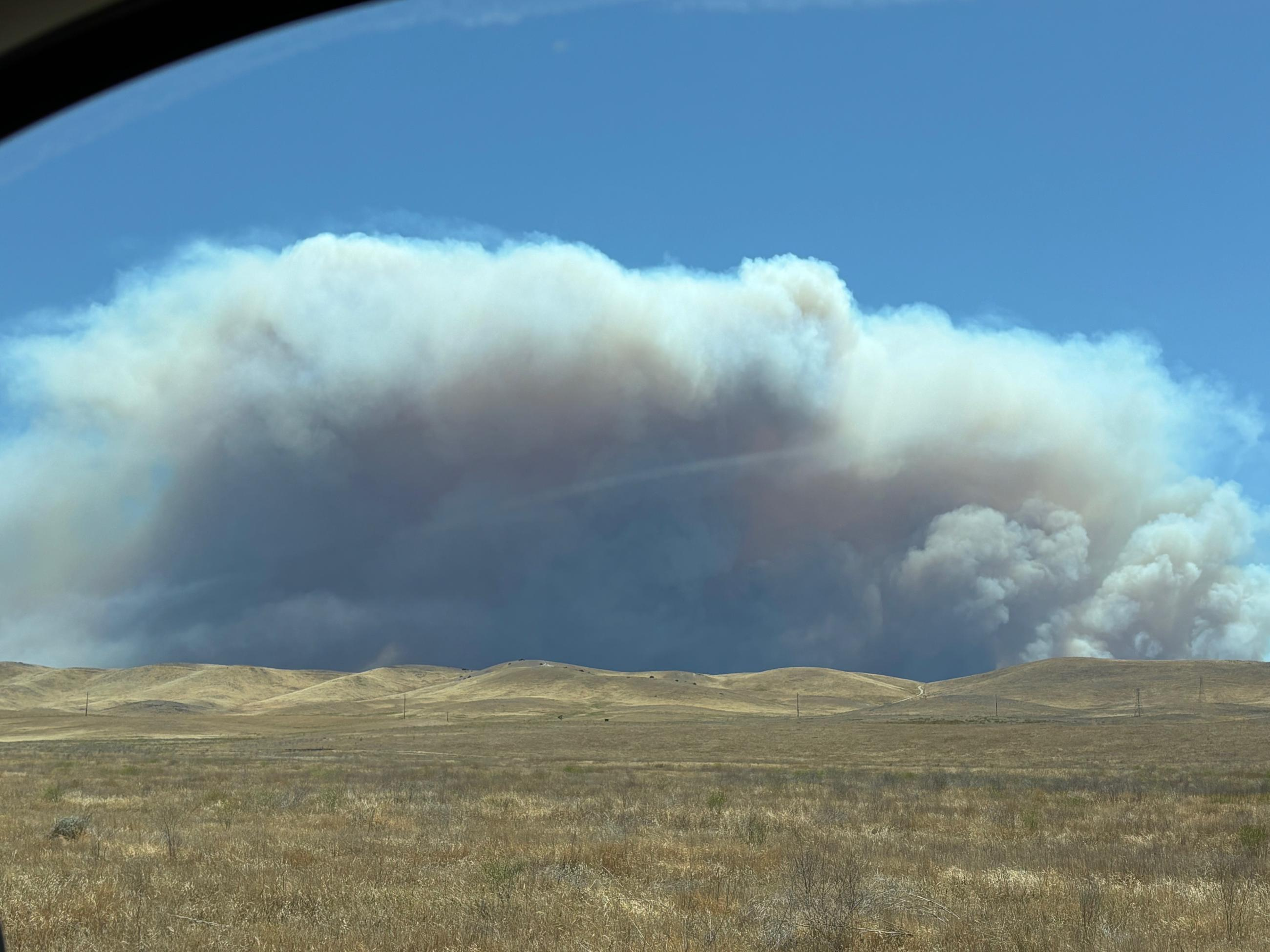
- A view of the Madre Fire on July 3, 2025.
- Date: January 7, 2025 - December 2025

Statistics
- Total fires: 8,036
- Total area: 525,223 acres (212,550 ha; 2,125.50 km^{2}; 820.661 sq mi)

Impacts
- Deaths: 31 (preliminary)
- Injuries: 22+
- Structures destroyed: 16,512

A series of wildfires burned throughout the state of California during 2025. By the end of the year, a total of 8,036 fires had burned 525,223 acres (212,550 ha) across the state.

== Background ==
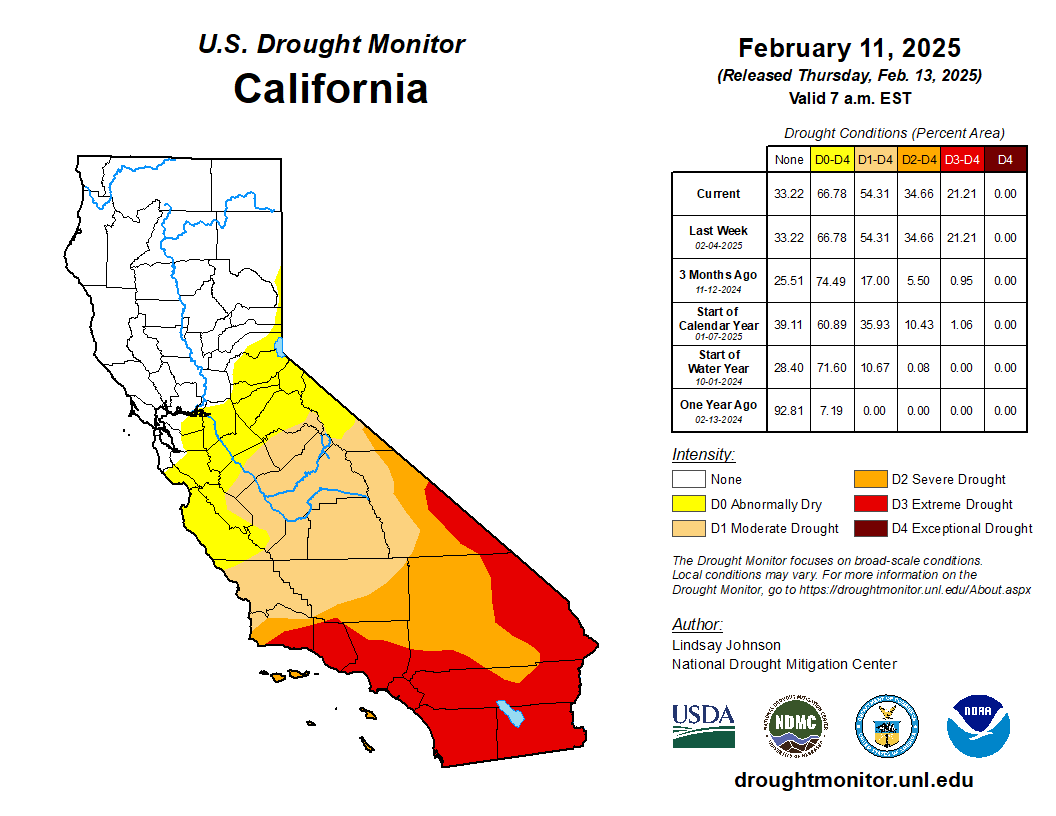
California Drought Monitor on February 11, 2025

The timing of "fire season" in California is variable, depending on the amount of prior winter and spring precipitation, the frequency and severity of weather such as heat waves and wind events, and moisture content in vegetation. Northern California typically sees wildfire activity between late spring and early fall, peaking in the summer with hotter and drier conditions. Occasional cold frontal passages can bring wind and lightning. The timing of fire season in Southern California is similar, peaking between late spring and autumn. The severity and duration of peak activity in either part of the state is modulated in part by weather events: downslope/offshore wind events can lead to critical fire weather, while onshore flow and Pacific weather systems can bring conditions that hamper wildfire growth.

== January wildfires ==
Climate change increased the likelihood of the event by creating first a very strong rainfall (which resulted in more vegetation), and then a very strong drought (which dried the vegetation). The likelihood for such events increased by 8-31% from 1950. Previous climate models underestimated the risk, but even they said that a 3-degree temperature rise will double the chances for such events in comparison to current conditions. Climate change also increases the intensity of winds, and reduces the amount of water available for stopping the wildfires.

Scientists from the University of California, Los Angeles made a fast evaluation, estimating that the difference between the average temperatures in 1980–2023 and the abnormally hot 2024 alone is responsible for 25% of the moisture deficit which was one of the causes of the wildfires. They mentioned that "Substantial anthropogenic warming occurred prior to this period, so our estimate of the effect of heat anomalies in 2024 is conservative". Their study is still not peer reviewed.

Another analysis from ClimaMeter estimated that the weather conditions in the region when the wildfires begun were "up 5°C warmer, 3 mm/day (up to 15%) drier, and up to 5 km/h (up to 20%) windier" during the years 1987–2023 in comparison to the years 1950–1986. It was mainly due to climate change, while natural variability played only a small role. Additionally, as climate change made the wildfire season in California longer, it further overlapped with the season of Santa Ana winds (October-January). Analysis from Climate Central and World Weather Attribution also found that climate change strongly increased the likelihood of the wildfires not by one, but by multiple ways.

The wildfires destroyed houses of some of the richest people in California, including many homes in Malibu's Carbon Beach, colloquially also known as "Billionaire's Beach". The estimated cost of these wildfires is about 250 to 275 billion US dollars. Organizations within California, like the Michelson Found Animals and Better Neighbor Project have come together to make donations and help families who have been affected by the fires.

== List of wildfires ==
The following is a list of fires that burned more than 1,000 acres (400 ha), produced significant structural damage, or resulted in casualties.

Name	County	Acres	Start date	Containment date (Note: Containment means that fire crews have established and secured control lines around the fire's perimeter. These lines are artificial barriers, like trenches or cleared vegetation, designed to stop the fire's spread, or natural barriers like rivers. Containment reflects progress in managing the fire but does not necessarily mean the fire is starved of fuel, under control, or put out.)	Notes	Ref.
Palisades	Los Angeles	23,448	January 7	January 31	Destroyed 6,837 structures and damaged 1,017 in Pacific Palisades and Malibu, northwest of Santa Monica; caused twelve confirmed fatalities and four confirmed injuries; third-most destructive wildfire in California history; associated with extremely powerful Santa Ana wind event	
Eaton	Los Angeles	14,021	January 7	January 31	Evacuations forced; destroyed 9,418 structures and damaged 1,073 in Altadena and Pasadena, making it the second-most destructive fire in California history; 17 confirmed fatalities and nine confirmed injuries, making it the fifth deadliest in state history; associated with extremely powerful Santa Ana wind event	
Kenneth	Ventura	1,052	January 9	January 12	Evacuations forced; associated with extremely powerful Santa Ana wind event	
Hughes	Los Angeles	10,425	January 22	January 30	Burned near Castaic Lake. Evacuations forced; associated with extremely powerful Santa Ana wind event beginning on January 22, 2025	
Border 2	San Diego	6,625	January 23	January 30	Vegetation fire that burned in the Otay Mountain Wilderness. Threatened critical infrastructure on Otay Mountain and prompted evacuations for nearby communities	
Silver	Inyo	1,611	March 30	April 6	Evacuation orders were issued for parts of Inyo and Mono counties.	
Springs	Kern, Tulare	1,817	May 6	May 7	Unknown cause. Burned near Fountain Springs.	
Democrat	Kern	1,700	May 18	May 28	Unknown cause. Burned near State Route 178 in Sequoia National Forest.	
Jaw	Kern	4,327	May 19	June 1	Burned near Jawbone Canyon.	
Rose	Fresno	1,200	June 2	June 3	Burned on Highway 74.	
Ranch	San Bernardino	4,293	June 10	June 20	Prompted evacuations south of State Route 18 in the Apple Valley area. Destroyed one structure.	
Dogs	Kern	4,407	June 13	June 15		
Bitter	San Luis Obispo	1,651	June 14	June 15		
Monte	San Diego	1,051	June 17	June 26		
Wolf	Riverside	2,387	June 29	July 15	Burned in the San Jacinto Mountains. Caused evacuations for parts of Banning and nearby areas as well as the closure of a portion of State Route 243. Injured three firefighters.	
Green	Shasta	19,022	July 1	August 17	Lightning-caused. Burned in the Shasta-Trinity National Forest.	
Madre	San Luis Obispo	80,779	July 2	July 26	Began along and caused the closure of State Route 166. Prompted evacuations for parts of California Valley. Destroyed an outbuilding and injured two firefighters.	
Butler	Siskiyou, Humboldt	21,058	July 3	August 15	Lightning-caused. Caused evacuations for the community of Forks of Salmon and surrounding areas. Part of the Orleans Complex.	
Dale	Riverside	1,096	July 16	July 22		
Mammoth	Modoc	2,533	July 25	July 31	Burned in the Modoc National Forest.	
Gifford	San Luis Obispo, Santa Barbara	131,614	August 1	September 28	Burned in the Los Padres National Forest. Destroyed five structures and caused 18 injuries.	
Gold	San Bernardino	1,036	August 4	August 28	Burned near Holcomb Valley.	
Rosa	Riverside	1,671	August 4	August 12	Prompted evacuations for Ribbonwood, Pinyon Pines, and other nearby areas. Destroyed 2 structures.	
Camp Pendleton	San Diego	1,000	August 5	August 7	Burned in Camp Pendleton. All units released from the fire on August 6.	
Canyon	Los Angeles, Ventura	5,370	August 7	August 14	Destroyed 7 structures near Hasley Canyon. Caused the evacuation of approximately 4,200 residents.	
Pickett	Napa	6,819	August 21	September 7	Burned in North Calistoga. Prompted evacuations for at least seventy residents.	
Little	Kern	2,506	August 22	September 5	Burned along and closed State Route 178 southwest of Lake Isabella. Prompted evacuations and closed several recreation areas.	
Garnet	Fresno	60,263	August 24	September 25	Lightning-caused. Burned north of the Kings River in Sierra National Forest.	
Dillon	Siskiyou	11,929	August 25	November 7	Caused the closure of State Route 96 in Klamath National Forest.	
Log	Siskiyou	1,170	August 26	October 2	Lightning-caused. Burned in the Marble Mountain Wilderness.	
Blue	Siskiyou	3,713	August 26	October 11	Lightning-caused. Burned nine miles (14 km) east of Happy Camp and prompted evacuation orders for the Seiad Valley area.	
Salt	Fresno, Kings, Monterey	25,580	September 2	September 12	Also known as the 14-2 Fire. Burned in the southern Diablo Range.	
2-2	Calaveras, Stanislaus	3,462	September 2	September 5	Lightning-caused. Part of the TCU September Lightning Complex.	
6-5	Tuolumne	6,935	September 2	September 13	Lightning-caused. Destroyed 95 structures, mostly in Chinese Camp. Part of the TCU September Lightning Complex.	
6-2	Tuolumne	1,025	September 2	September 12	Lightning-caused. Part of the TCU September Lightning Complex.	
2-8	Calaveras	1,340	September 2	September 9	Lightning-caused. Part of the TCU September Lightning Complex.	
Marmon	Fresno	1,034	September 2	September 5		
1-4	Mariposa	4,451	September 2	September 7	Burned near Raymond.	
Pack	Mono	1,974	November 13	December 3	Burned near Crowley Lake and prompted evacuations. Destroyed thirty structures and damaged six others.	

Perimeters of 2025 California wildfires

== See also ==
- 2025 United States wildfires
  - January 2025 Southern California wildfires
    - FireAid, January 2025 benefit concert for relief efforts for the Los Angeles wildfires
