= Chicken Ranch Rancheria of Me-Wuk Indians of California =

Indian tribe in California, United States

Coordinates: 37°55′40″N 120°26′59″W

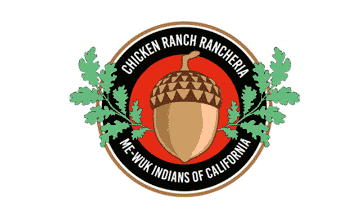
- Flag of the Chicken Ranch Rancheria of Me-Wuk Indians of California

Total population
- 11

Regions with significant populations
- United States (California)

Languages
- English, historically Central Sierra Miwok language

Related ethnic groups
- other Miwok tribes

The Chicken Ranch Rancheria of Me-Wuk Indians of California is a federally recognized tribe of Miwok people in Tuolumne County, California. The Chicken Ranch Rancheria Miwok are central Sierra Miwok, an Indigenous people of California.

== Government ==
The tribe conducts business from Jamestown, California. The tribe is led by an elected council.

== Reservation ==
Location of Chicken Ranch Rancheria

The Chicken Ranch Rancheria is 2.85-acre parcel of land, located in Tuolumne County.

== Casino and resort ==
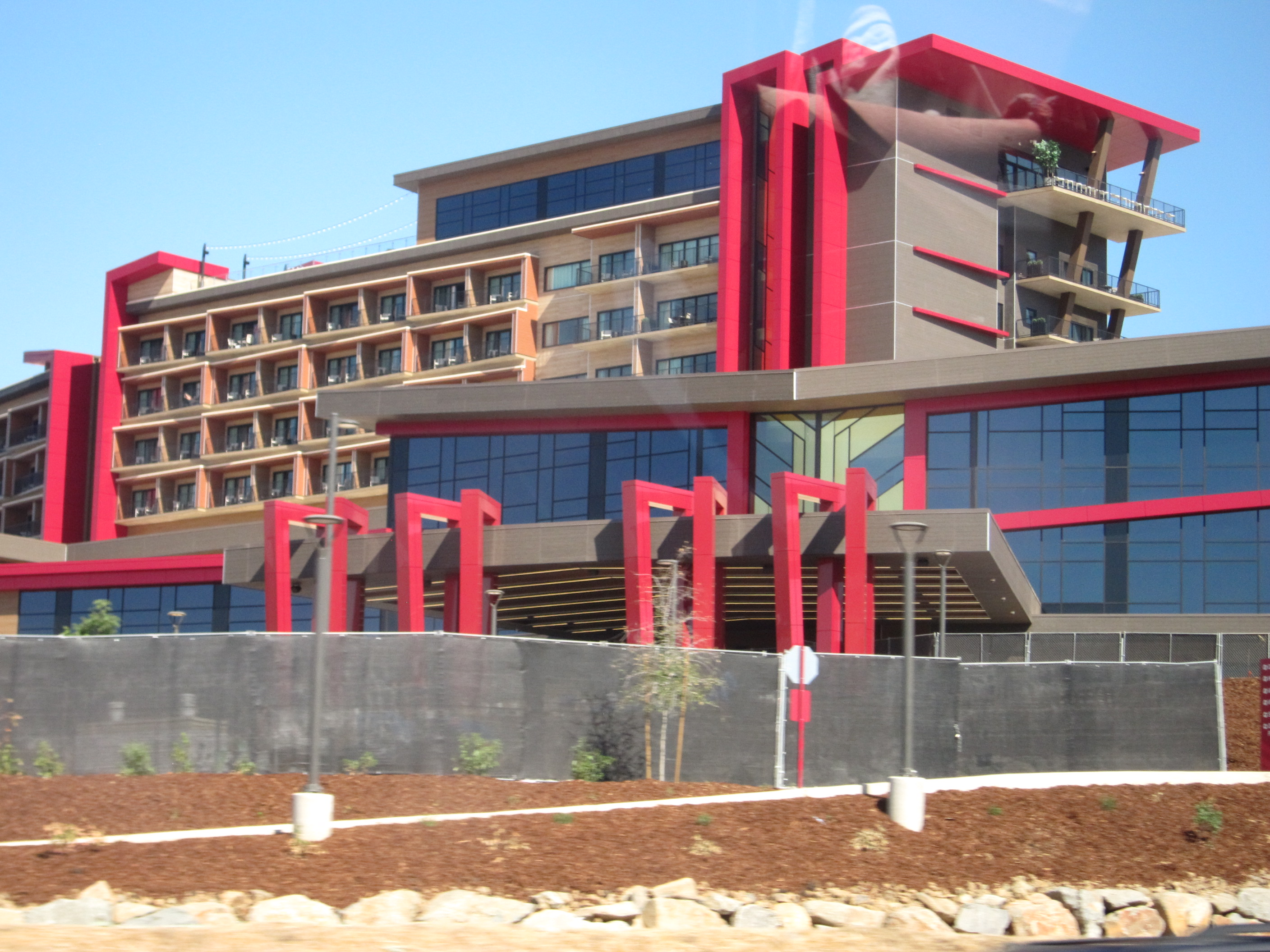
The Chicken Ranch Casino Resort's hotel tower during construction in 2024.

The tribe owns the Chicken Ranch Casino Resort in Jamestown, targeting visitors from the Bay Area, Sacramento, Reno and Fresno areas; it is approximatley an hour's driving time from Yosemite National Park. The resort has been expanded several times since 1985, when the tribe first opened a bingo hall on the site. Slot machines were added in 2000, with more expansions through the years; a hotel tower and resort were opened in the fall of 2024.

== Education ==
The ranchería is served by the Jamestown Elementary School District and Sonora Union High School District.
