= Canyon Fire (2025) =

2025 wildfire in Los Angeles and Ventura County, California

- Part of the 2025 California wildfires
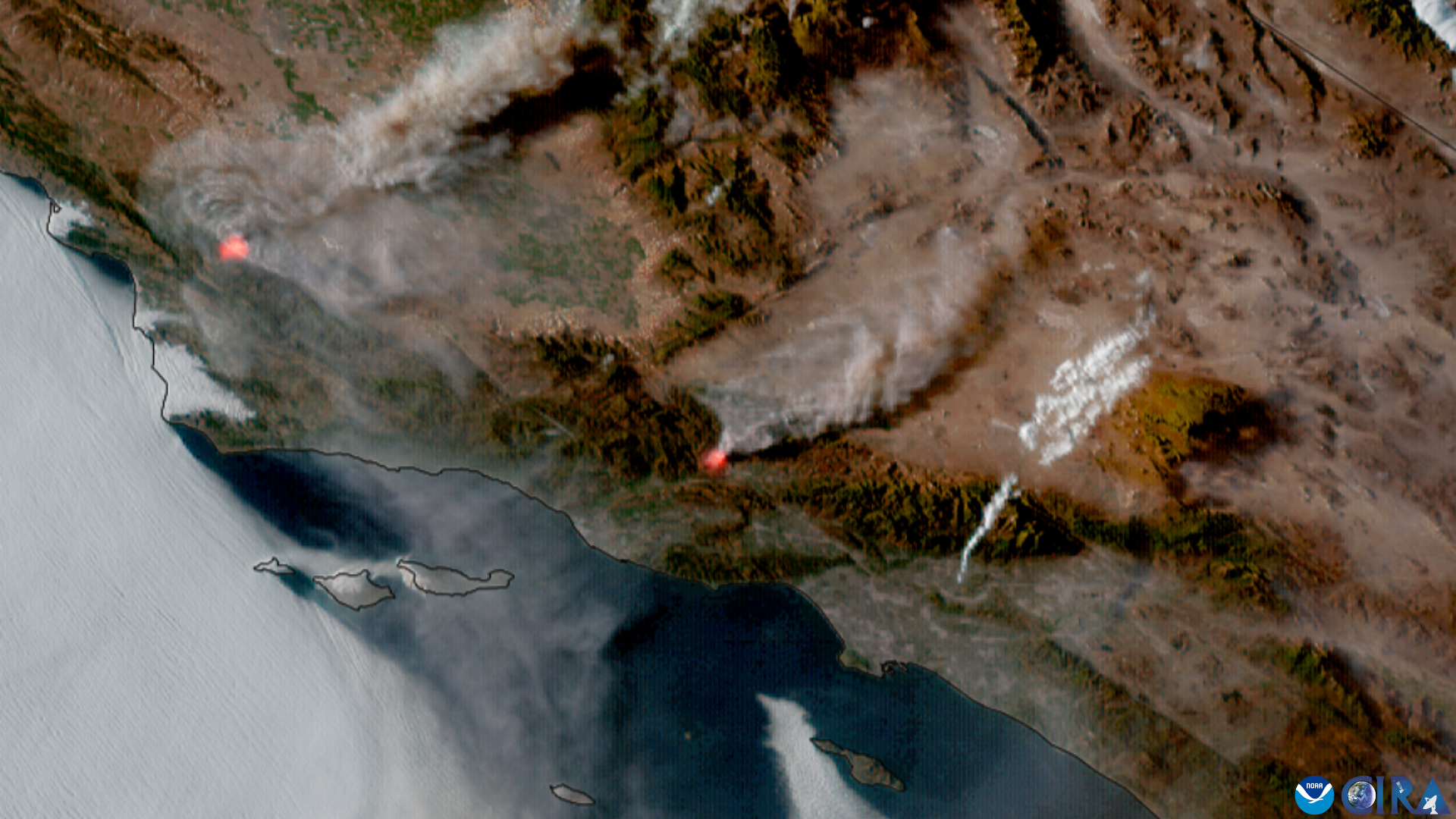
- Satellite imagery of the Canyon Fire (right) and the Gifford Fire (left) burning in Southern California
- Date: August 7, 2025 – August 14, 2025
- Location: Castaic, California
- Coordinates: 34°26′29″N 118°44′06″W

Statistics
- Status: Extinguished
- Perimeter: 100% contained
- Burned area: 5,370 acres (2,173 ha)

Impacts
- Injuries: 3 firefighters
- Structures lost: 2 single family residences, 8 buildings, 2 outbuildings

Ignition
- Cause: Under investigation

Map
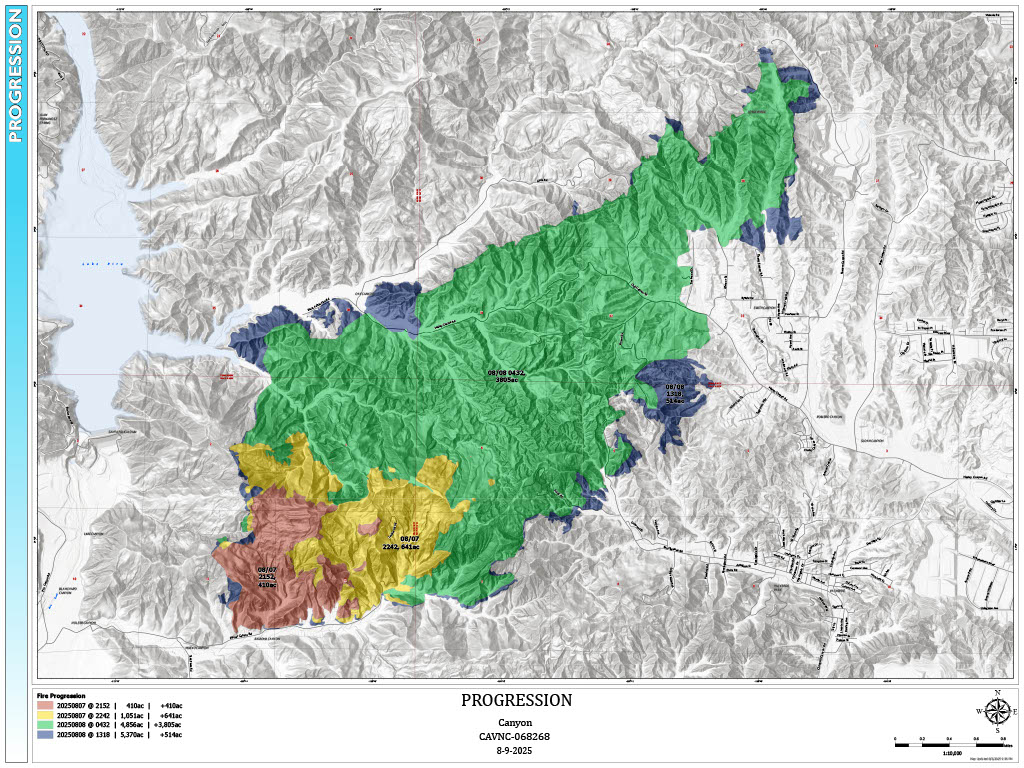
- Progression map of the 2025 Canyon Fire

The Canyon Fire was a wildfire near Castaic, California that began on August 7, 2025. It was fully contained on August 14, 2025. The fire burned 5,370 acres (2,173 ha).

== Background ==
100 °F+ temperatures across inland Southern California valleys, paired with afternoon canyon winds, contributed to the Canyon Fire’s rapid growth along the Los Angeles–Ventura County line. Low relative humidity and a series of red flag warnings issued by the National Weather Service further worsened conditions, as hot, dry air massed over the region during an extended summer heat wave.

Persistent drought across Southern California compounded the threat. According to the CAL FIRE seasonal outlook, precipitation totals since the start of summer 2025 were well below average, leaving chaparral and brush at critically low fuel moisture levels. This extended drying period accelerated flammability, while the absence of coastal moisture intrusions from the Pacific failed to moderate fire weather conditions.

== Progression ==
The Canyon Fire was first reported on August 7, 2025, at around 1:25 p.m. PST near Highway 126 and Castaic in northern Los Angeles County, close to the border with Ventura County.

By the evening of August 7, the fire had grown to nearly 4,900 acres with no containment. Evacuation orders were issued for around 2,700 residents, affecting roughly 700 structures, while evacuation warnings covered about 14,000 residents and thousands of additional structures.

On August 8, more than 400 firefighters, assisted by aircraft and ground equipment, worked to contain the blaze. Containment improved to about 28% that day, and some evacuation orders were downgraded to warnings as conditions stabilized.

The fire ultimately burned 5,370 acres before being fully contained later in August.

The cause of the wildfire is under investigation.

== Impact ==
The fire forced the closure of portions of Interstate 5 near Castaic and shut down recreation access around Castaic Lake. Evacuation orders were issued by the California Department of Forestry and Fire Protection for neighborhoods in northern Los Angeles County and eastern Ventura County.

At its peak, the Canyon Fire threatened more than 700 structures and prompted evacuation orders for roughly 2,700 residents, with an additional 14,000 placed under evacuation warnings.

One serious injury was reported when Battalion Chief James Agee of the Kern County Fire Department was involved in a vehicle rollover accident in Romero Canyon while monitoring fire conditions. He was airlifted to a hospital in stable condition. No civilian fatalities were reported.

By August 9, evacuation orders were lifted as containment improved to 28%, though hot weather and poor air quality continued to affect the region. The fire ultimately burned 5,370 acres before full containment was declared later in August.

== Growth and containment table ==
Date	Area burned	Personnel	Containment
August 7	600 acres (240 ha; 2.4 km^{2})	250	
August 8	4,856 acres (1,965 ha; 19.65 km^{2})	391	
August 9	5,730 acres (2,320 ha; 23.2 km^{2})	1,158	
August 10	5,730 acres (2,320 ha; 23.2 km^{2})	960	
. . .	. . .	. . .	. . .
August 13	5,730 acres (2,320 ha; 23.2 km^{2})	960	
August 14	5,730 acres (2,320 ha; 23.2 km^{2})	960	

== See also ==
- 2025 California wildfires
- List of California wildfires
