= Orleans Complex Fire =

2025 wildfire in Orleans, California

- Part of the 2025 California wildfires
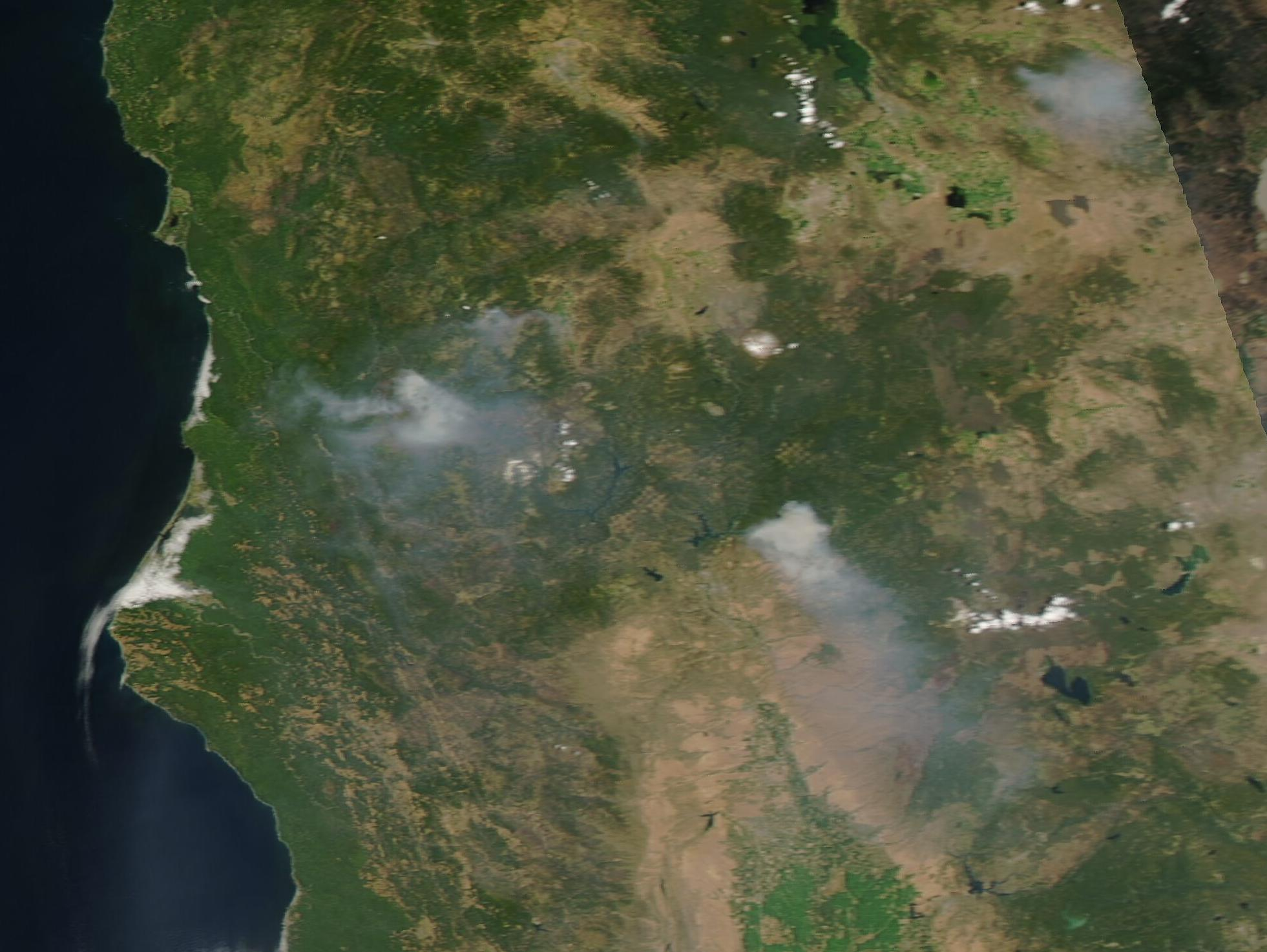
- Smoke from the Orleans Complex and the nearby Green Fire seen on satellite imagery
- Date: July 3, 2025 – August 15, 2025
- Location: Orleans, California & Six Rivers National Forest
- Coordinates: 41°24′20″N 123°35′20″W

Statistics
- Burned area: 22,117 acres (8,950 ha)

Impacts
- Injuries: 3 firefighters

Ignition
- Cause: Lightning

Map
- Location in northern California

The Orleans Complex Fire was a wildfire that burned near Orleans, California, in Six Rivers National Forest that began on July 3, 2025. The complex fire is made up of the Butler Fire and the Red Fire that both began in early July. As of August 11, the fire had so far burned 22,117 acres (8,950 ha) and was 81% contained.

== Background ==
A Red flag warning, issued by the National Weather Service, was impactful in the early days of the Orleans Complex Fire—indicating a volatile mix of hot temperatures, low relative humidity, and gusty outflow winds—conditions primed for extreme fire behavior.

The Orleans Complex—comprising the Butler Fire and the Red Fire—both began in early July and quickly coalesced. The smoke plume was visible regionally by mid-July as they burned through mixed timber and brush fuels with lower moisture levels, thanks to lingering regional drought conditions.

Lightning was confirmed as the ignition source for the Complex, consistent with the lightning ignition patterns seen across Northern California that month. Over its first week, the fire expanded steadily—surpassing 15,700 acres burned with negligible containment—prompting widespread evacuation orders, road closures, and community alerts.

== Progression ==
The confirmed cause of the Orleans Complex Fire, including the Butler Fire, was lightning. This is consistent with the region’s history of dry thunderstorms during summer months, which often spark wildfires in forested areas. The fire’s rapid spread and difficult terrain made containment efforts extremely challenging.

The Orleans Complex Fire was first reported on July 3, 2025, at around 6:00 pm PST.

On July 19, at approximately 2:15 pm PST, a tree fell on three firefighters who were actively battling the Butler Fire. According to the U.S. Forest Service, the incident occurred during intense firefighting efforts in rugged terrain.

One firefighter was reported in critical condition, while the other two sustained serious but non-critical injuries.

All three were transported to Redding for medical treatment.

The incident prompted an internal investigation and highlighted the hazardous conditions crews were facing.

=== Cause ===
The cause of the fire is confirmed to be lightning.

== Impact ==
=== Closures and evacuations ===
On July 7, after the Butler Fire ignited in Six Rivers National Forest, the first evacuation orders were issued.

Six Rivers National Forest and Klamath National Forests issued a joint closure order that affects the Nordheimer and Oak Bottom campgrounds.

On July 15, the evacuation zone was expanded to include the entire community of Forks of Salmon.

== See also ==
- 2025 California wildfires
- List of California wildfires
