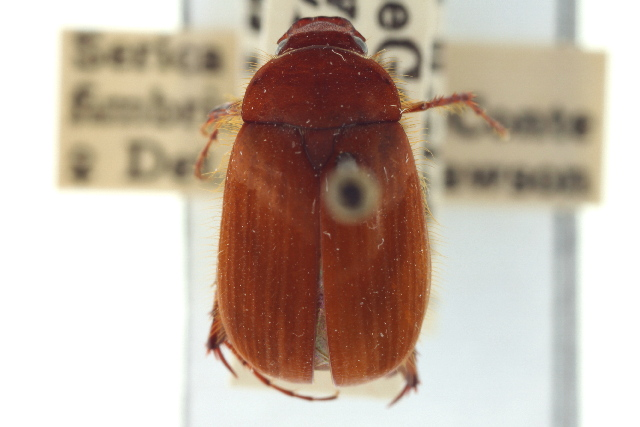

Scientific classification
- Kingdom: Animalia
- Phylum: Arthropoda
- Class: Insecta
- Order: Coleoptera
- Suborder: Polyphaga
- Infraorder: Scarabaeiformia
- Family: Scarabaeidae
- Genus: Serica
- Species: S. fimbriata

Binomial name
- Serica fimbriata LeConte, 1856

Synonyms
- Serica michelbacheri Saylor, 1948

= Serica fimbriata =

Species of beetle

Serica fimbriata is a species of scarab beetle in the family Scarabaeidae. It is found in Central America and North America (California and Mexico).

== Description ==
Adults reach a length of about 10.5 mm. The colour is bright chestnut brown to fulvous with a strong velvety opacity. The under surface and legs (especially the front and middle ones) are covered with long, erect, fulvous hairs. The pronotal and elytral margins are fimbriate with long, stiff, fulvous hairs.

== Life history ==
Adults have been recorded feeding on Lotus scoparius, the flowers of Eriogonum fasciculatum, the flowers of Adenostoma fasciculatum and the flowers of Adenostoma sparsifolium.
