= Madre Fire =

2025 wildfire in California, USA

- Part of the 2025 California wildfires
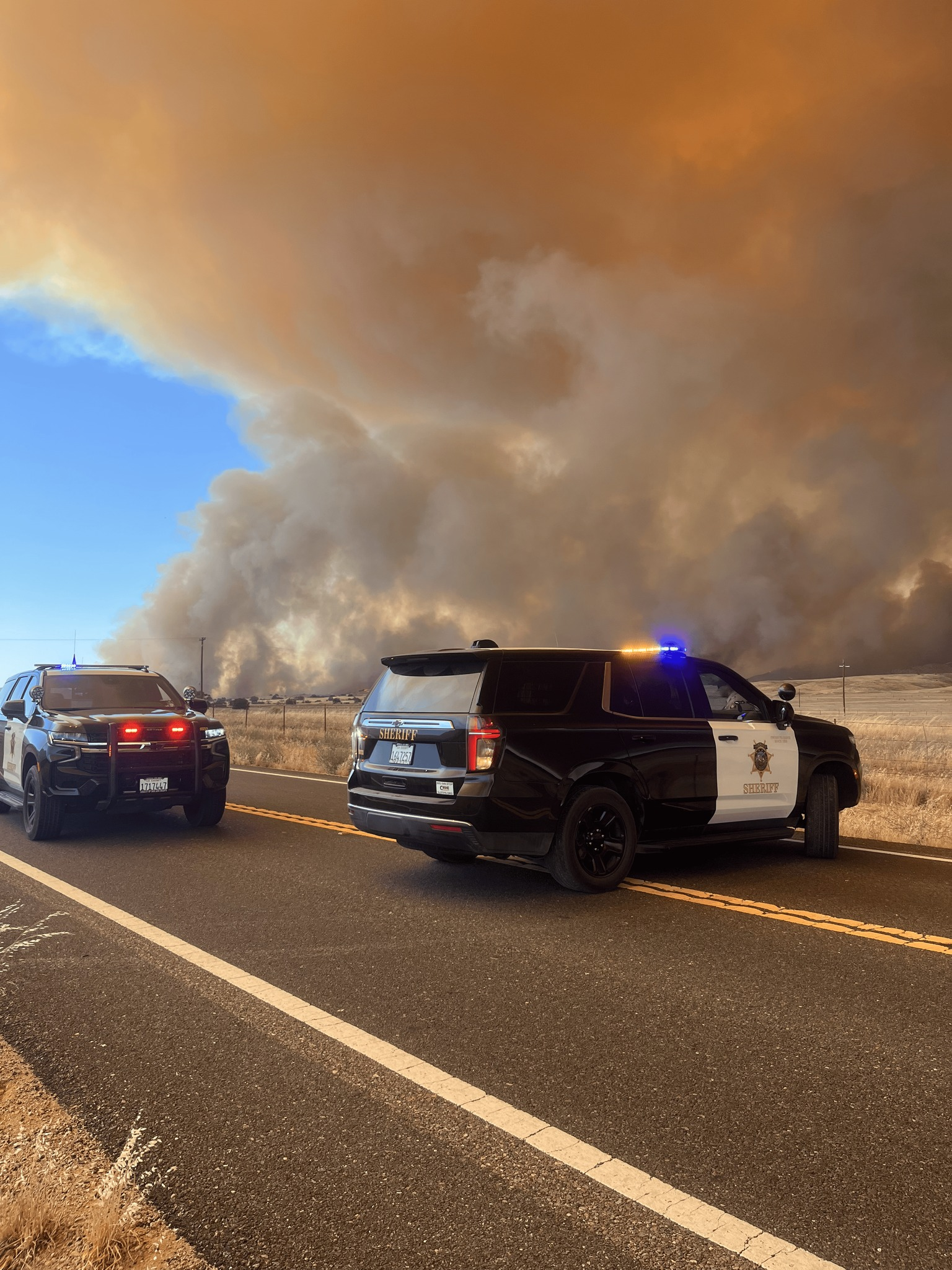
- The fire burning on July 2
- Date: July 2, 2025 – July 26, 2025

Statistics
- Perimeter: 100% contained
- Burned area: 80,786 acres (32,693 ha; 126 sq mi; 327 km^{2})

Impacts
- Deaths: 0
- Injuries: 2 (Firefighter)

Ignition
- Cause: Under investigation

Map
- Perimeter of Madre Fire (map data)

The Madre Fire was a large wildfire that burned in San Luis Obispo County, California. The fire was the largest of the 2025 California wildfire season, having burned 80,786 acres (32,693 ha) as of July 26, until being surpassed by the Gifford Fire two weeks later.

== Background ==
A persistent Red flag warning, issued by the National Weather Service, was in effect across the region during the onset of the Madre Fire, reflecting a convergence of triple-digit temperatures, single-digit relative humidity, and strong downslope gusts. These conditions heightened the likelihood of rapid ignition and extreme fire behavior.

Initial spread was expedited by cured grasslands, dense chaparral, and steep terrain along Highway 166, which funneled wind through canyons. The blaze grew from just a few hundred acres at ignition to 8,000 acres (3,200 ha) by the evening of July 2, and surged to more than 35,000 acres (14,000 ha) by the following morning.

Persistent drought across Southern California compounded the threat. According to Cal Fire’s statewide archive, rainfall totals since the previous winter amounted to less than 70 percent of average, leaving both live and dead fuel moisture at critically low levels. This long-term drying accelerated flammability, while weakened marine layers allowed hot, dry air to dominate inland valleys and foothills.

Overall, the alignment of extreme weather, record-dry fuels, and complex topography provided the backdrop for the Madre Fire’s explosive growth. Within its first 48 hours, it became the largest wildfire of the year in California, ultimately burning 80,786 acres (32,693 ha) before full containment on July 26.

== Progression ==
The fire began at 1:07 p.m. on July 2. The cause is currently under investigation. It quickly grew in size to 500 acres (200 ha), before reaching over 8,000 acres (3,200 ha). Late on July 2 the fire reached 9,800 acres (4,000 ha), before exploding in size to 35,530 acres (14,380 ha) acres early on July 3. Later on July 3 the fire reached 52,593 acres (21,284 ha) acres in size. The fire was fully contained on July 26th after burning 80,786 acres (32,693 ha) acres and injuring 2 firefighters.

== Effects ==
The fire prompted the closure of California State Route 166. Evacuation orders were issued by the California Department of Forestry and Fire Protection on July 2 and 3 for zones SLC-337, LPF-017, SLC-226, SLC-264, SLC-265, SLC-299, SLC-312, SLC-338, and evacuation warnings for zones SLC-312, SLC-263, SLC-298, SLC-300, SLC-313, SLC-339, and SLC-358. 50 structures have been threatened by the fire.

The fire is the second largest of the 2025 California wildfire season.

== Growth and containment table ==
Fire containment status Gray: contained; Red: active; %: percent contained;
Date	Area burned	Personnel	Containment
July 2	200 acres (81 ha; 0.81 km^{2})	. . .	
July 3	52,592 acres (21,283 ha; 212.83 km^{2})	594	
July 4	70,800 acres (28,700 ha; 287 km^{2})	608	
July 5	79,936 acres (32,349 ha; 323.49 km^{2})	1,122	
July 6	80,480 acres (32,570 ha; 325.7 km^{2})	1,472	
July 7	80,603 acres (32,619 ha; 326.19 km^{2})	1,573	
July 8	80,610 acres (32,620 ha; 326.2 km^{2})	1,450	
July 9	80,583 acres (32,611 ha; 326.11 km^{2})	1,330	
July 10	80,786 acres (32,693 ha; 326.93 km^{2})	1,183	
July 11	80,786 acres (32,693 ha; 326.93 km^{2})	985	
July 12	80,786 acres (32,693 ha; 326.93 km^{2})	856	
July 13	80,786 acres (32,693 ha; 326.93 km^{2})	587	
. . .	. . .	. . .	. . .
July 16	80,786 acres (32,693 ha; 326.93 km^{2})	224	
. . .	. . .	. . .	. . .
July 25	80,786 acres (32,693 ha; 326.93 km^{2})	. . .	

== See also ==
- List of California wildfires
- 2025 California wildfires
- Gifford Fire
