= Gifford Fire =

2025 megafire in California; now contained

- Part of the 2025 California wildfires
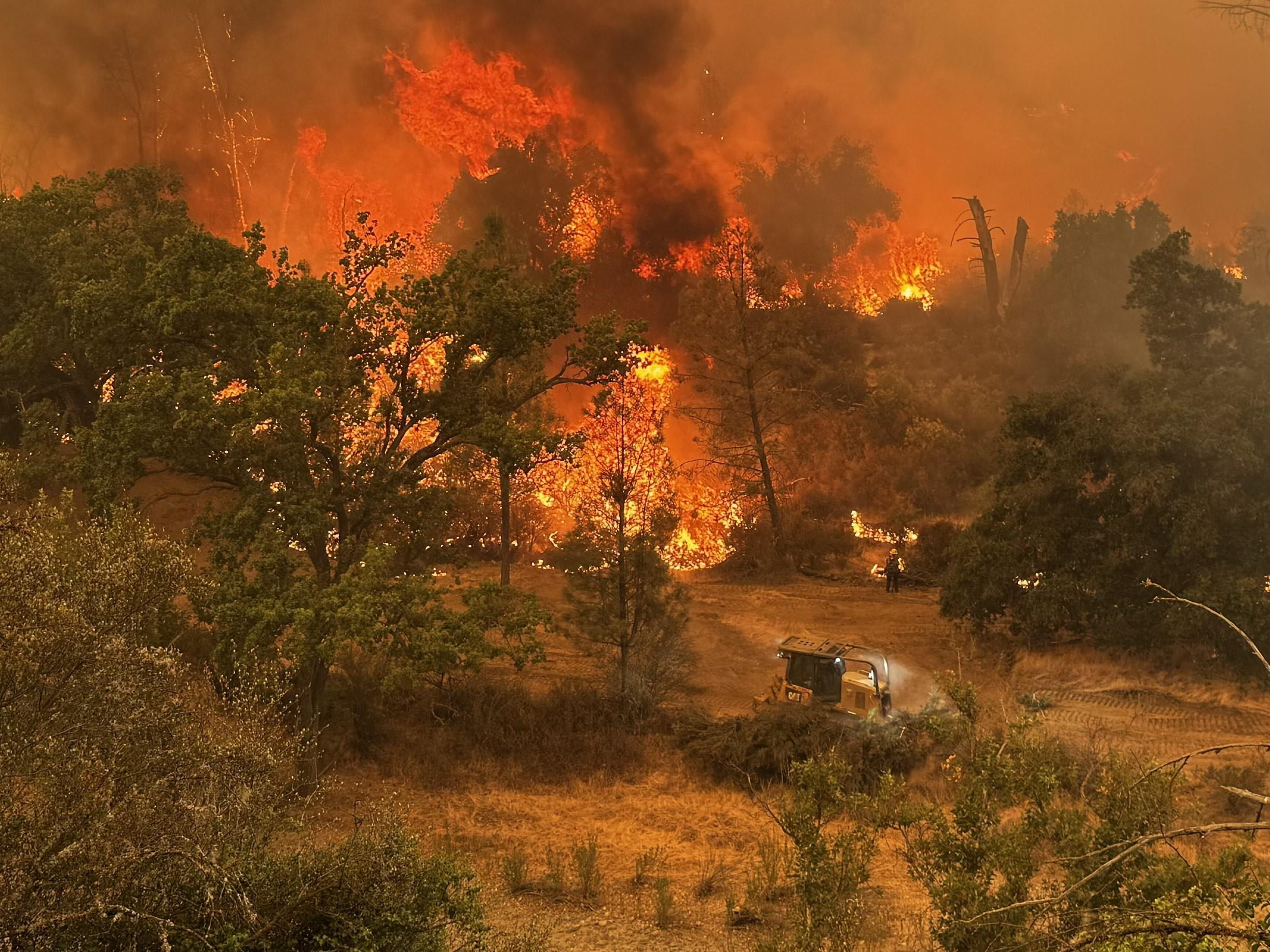
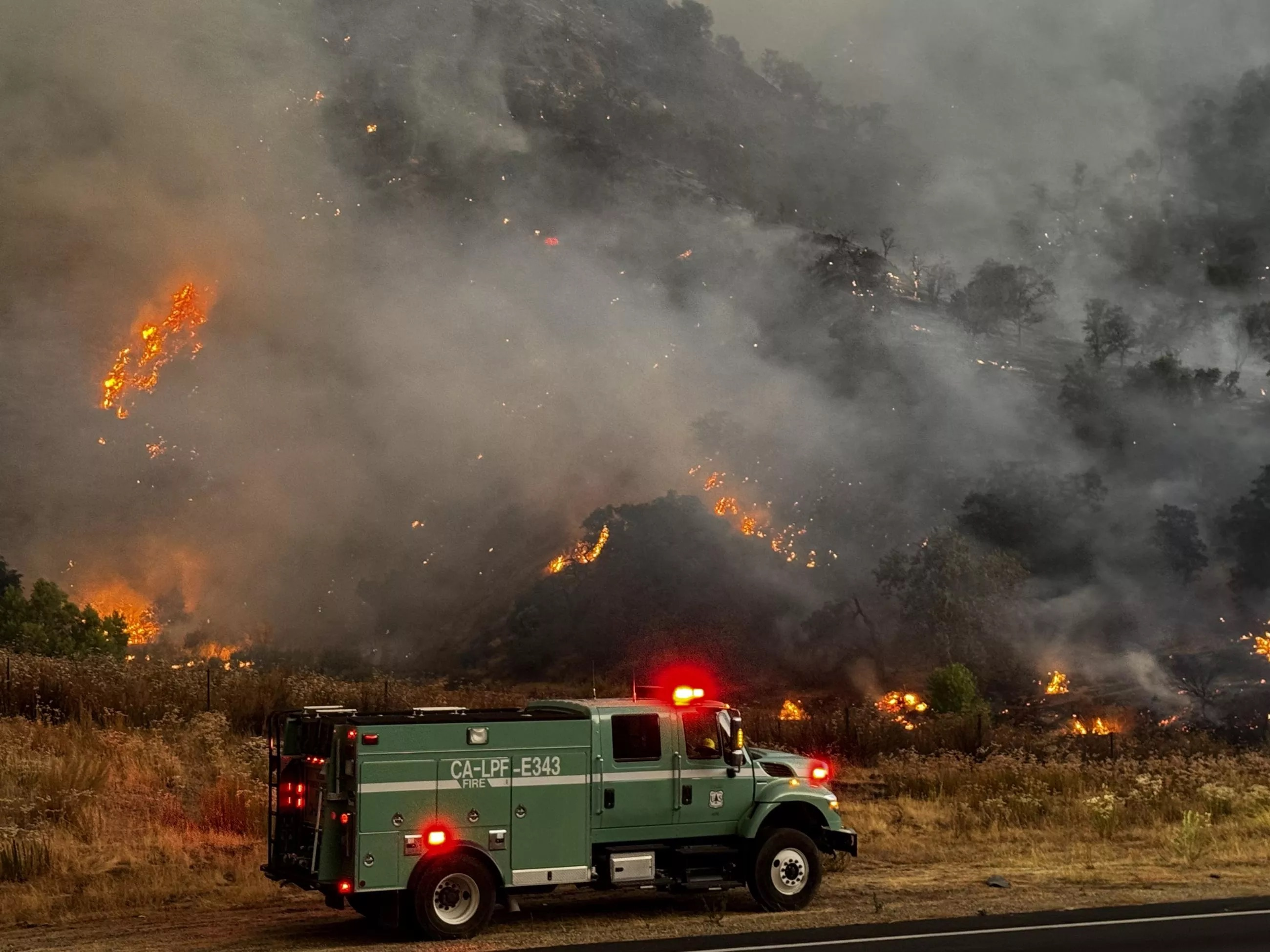
- Top: Heavy equipment cutting fireline around the Gifford Fire, on August 12, 2025. Bottom: A fire engine (343) stopped next to the large Gifford Fire on August 7, 2025
- Date: August 1, 2025 – September 28, 2025
- Location: San Luis Obispo County, Santa Barbara County
- Coordinates: 35°04′35″N 120°09′33″W

Statistics
- Perimeter: 100% contained
- Burned area: 131,614 acres (53,262 ha)

Impacts
- Injuries: 15 firefighters, 3 civilians
- Structures destroyed: 5 destroyed, 2 damaged
- Cost: $202.5 million

Ignition
- Cause: Under Investigation

Map
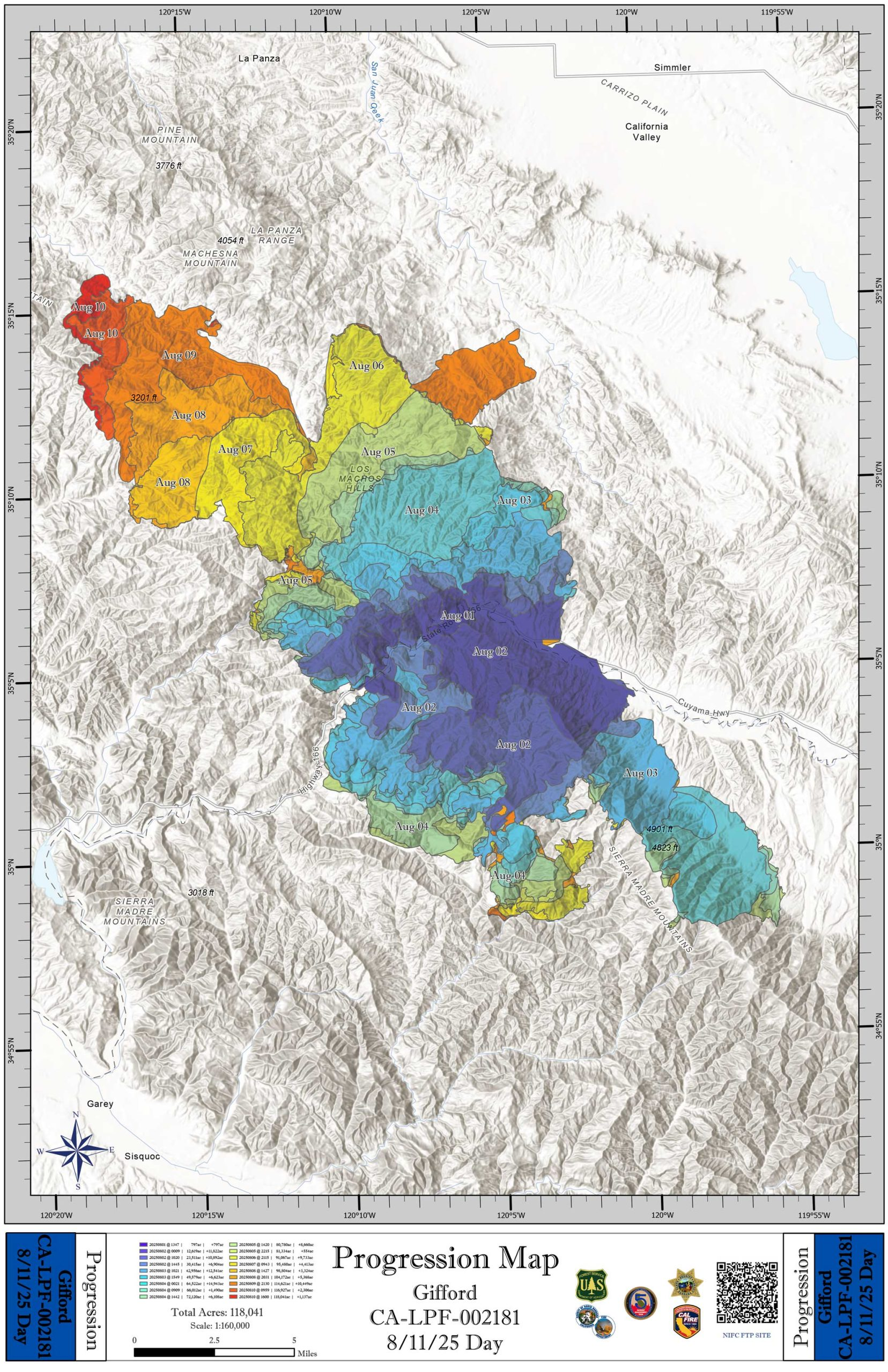
- Progression map of the Gifford Fire on August 11, 2025

Perimeter of the Gifford Fire and the Madre Fire (map data)

The Gifford Fire was a megafire that burned in San Luis Obispo and Santa Barbara Counties in the U.S. state of California. The fire began on August 1, 2025, and was declared 100% contained on September 28, 2025. It burned 131,614 acres (53,262 ha). It was one of the largest wildfires in the United States during the 2025 wildfire season. The fire was close to the community of Pozo, and destroyed five structures and damaged two.

== Background ==
Rising temperatures around 95 °F have been present during the fire, despite calmer winds. However, low relative humidity and a red flag warning mostly triggered by the high temperatures have fueled the fire's growth. The area has received very little precipitation, drying out the abundant grass loads, and coastal moisture has been lowering.

Persistent drought across Southern California compounded the threat. According to Cal Fire’s statewide archive, rainfall totals since the previous winter amounted to less than 70 percent of average, leaving both live and dead fuel moisture at critically low levels. This long-term drying accelerated flammability, while weakened marine layers allowed hot, dry air to dominate inland valleys and foothills.

== Progression ==
The Gifford Fire was first reported at approximately 3:44 p.m. on August 1, 2025, northeast of Santa Maria, California. The cause remains under investigation. It ignited less than a week after the nearby Madre Fire had been contained in the same area.

Fueled by hot, dry, and windy conditions, the fire expanded rapidly—reaching around 5,000 acres within its first few hours. Two days later, on August 3, it had grown to about 49,761 acres, and by August 5, the burned area had increased to approximately 82,567 acres.

By August 8, the fire had consumed about 104,402 acres, with containment holding at only 21%. Within 24 hours, the burned area had surpassed 112,300 acres.

The fire’s progression later prompted rapid escalation—on August 11, it achieved “megafire” status after igniting over 119,767 acres and becoming California's largest wildfire of the season. Containment at that time stood at approximately 33%.

By mid-August, improved weather and intensified firefighting efforts led to a sharp increase in containment. As of August 17, containment had risen to 89%, with the fire area estimated at 131,589 acres. Both personnel and evacuation zones were significantly reduced, and mop-up operations continued. The fire remained active, restricted by strong containment lines and better conditions.

By August 18–20, the fire remained stable in size (around 131,589 acres) while containment improved to approximately 95 percent. Fire management tactics shifted towoard extinguishing hot spots, reinforcing containment lines, and reducing personnel gradually.

On August 24, Cal Fire reported the fire had burned 131,614 acres, with 95 percent containment. At that time, 506 structures remained threatened, and five structures were confirmed destroyed. Personnel counts had dropped significantly, with reduced numbers of both firefighter injuries (13) and civilian injuries (3) recorded during the incident period.

Caltrans also noted that the Gifford Fire interrupted plans to close California State Route 33 near Ojai, which remained open as a critical evacuation route, though the closure was rescheduled for later due to wildfire concerns.

From August 25 to 31, containment increased from 95% to 97%, with only interior pockets of smoke observed.

On September 5, crews held the footprint at 132,605 acres (53,663 ha), 98% contained, while continuing mop-up and patrols.

By September 12, the fire remained active but was largely held within established lines; CAL FIRE listed the incident at 98% containment with a mapped area of 131,614 acres. Command had been transitioned to Los Padres National Forest operational control (LPF-ICT3) and crews continued mop-up, patrol and suppression-repair activities while resources were gradually released.

== Effects ==
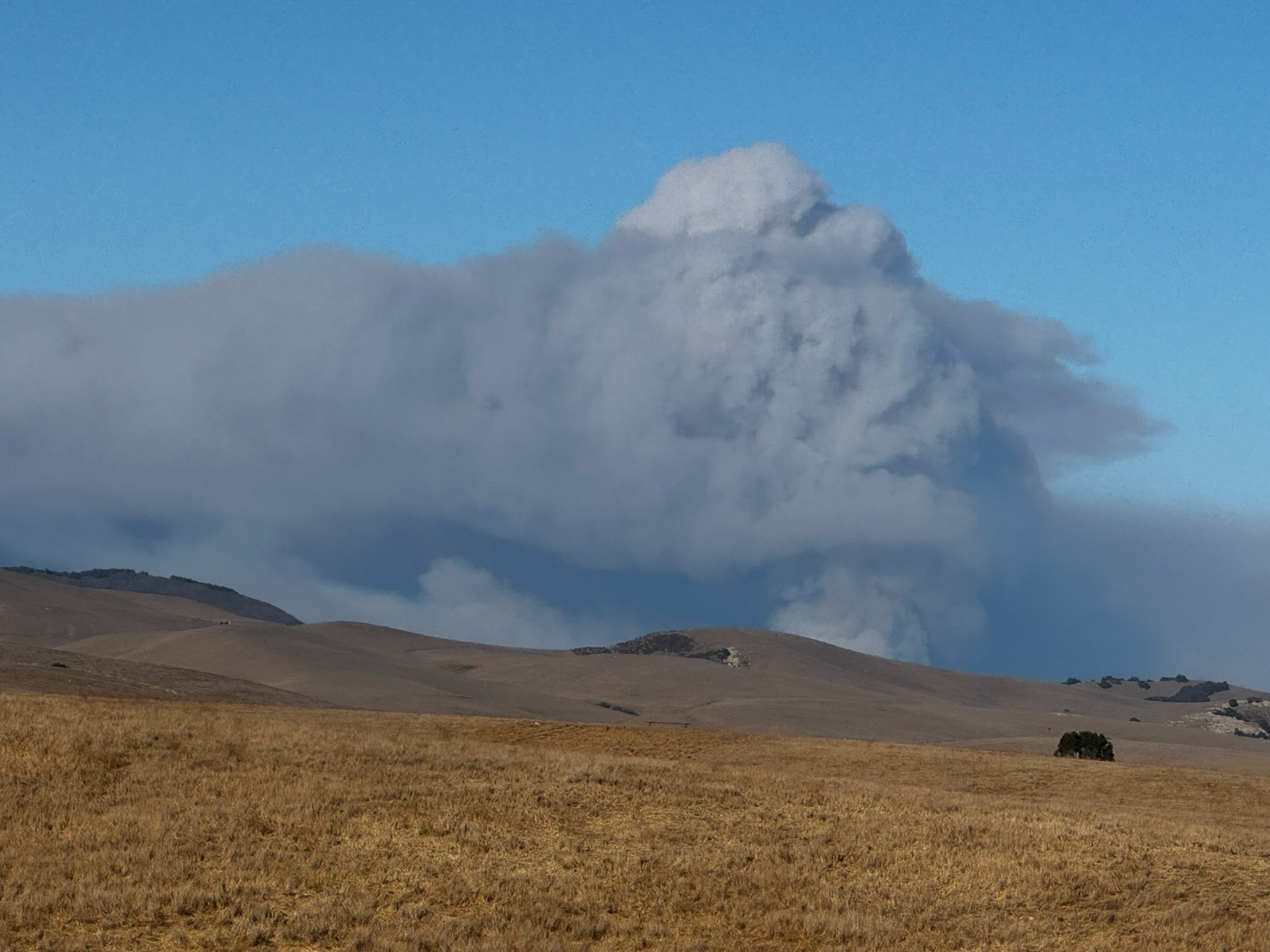
Smoke plume from the Gifford Fire seen on August 7, 2025

The fire prompted the closures of California State Route 166, from Santa Maria to Cuyama, along with Los Padres National Forest. Evacuation orders were issued by the California Department of Forestry and Fire Protection in San Luis Obispo County and Santa Barbara County for zones LPF-009, LPF-010, LPF-011, LPF-012, LPF-013, LPF-014, LPF-015, LPF-016, LPF-017, LPF-018, LPF-019, SLC-222, SLC-223, SLC-225, SLC-239, SLC-240, SLC-259, SLC-260, SLC-261, SLC-262, SLC-263, SLC-264, SLC-296, SLC-297, SLC-298, SLC-311, SLC-334, SLC-335, SLC-336, SLC-337, LPF-165, SBC-159-A, SBC-161-A, SBC-163, SBC-167, SBC-169-A, and SBC-169-B. At its peak, over 2,912 structures were threatened by the wildfire.

There have been seven injuries from the fire, four firefighters and three civilians. This includes one firefighter treated for dehydration, and one civilian exited his vehicle and was hospitalized after being overtaken by flames.

On August 5, the fire passed the Madre Fire to became the largest of the 2025 California wildfire season.

By mid-September, was no longer threatening communities, with suppression repair and erosion-control projects underway.

== Growth and containment ==
Fire containment status Gray: contained; Red: active; %: percent contained;
Date	Area burned	Personnel	Containment
August 1	818 acres (3 km^{2})	...	
August 2	23,589 acres (95 km^{2})	...	
August 3	39,676 acres (161 km^{2})	...	
August 4	65,062 acres (263 km^{2})	...	
August 5	83,933 acres (340 km^{2})	...	
August 6	91,278 acres (369 km^{2})	...	
August 7	99,232 acres (402 km^{2})	3,431	
August 8	104,590 acres (423 km^{2})	3,431	
August 9	113,648 acres (460 km^{2})	3,935	
August 10	118,068 acres (478 km^{2})	4,299	
August 11	120,779 acres (489 km^{2})	4,299	
August 12	125,272 acres (507 km^{2})	4,946	
August 13	130,440 acres (528 km^{2})	4,979	
August 14	132,605 acres (537 km^{2})	4,946	
August 15	132,605 acres (537 km^{2})	4,789	
August 16	132,605 acres (537 km^{2})	3,761	
August 17	131,589 acres (533 km^{2})	3,047	
August 18	131,589 acres (533 km^{2})	3,047	
August 19	131,589 acres (533 km^{2})	2,713	
August 20	131,589 acres (533 km^{2})	2,713	
August 21	131,589 acres (533 km^{2})	2,250	
August 22	131,614 acres (533 km^{2})	1,881	
August 23	131,614 acres (533 km^{2})	1,874	
August 24	131,614 acres (533 km^{2})	1,824	
August 25	131,614 acres (533 km^{2})	1,578	
August 26	131,614 acres (533 km^{2})	1,478	
August 27	131,614 acres (533 km^{2})	1,375	
August 28	131,614 acres (533 km^{2})	1,242	
August 29	131,614 acres (533 km^{2})	1,242	
August 30	131,614 acres (533 km^{2})	1,071	
August 31	131,614 acres (533 km^{2})	941	
September 1	131,614 acres (533 km^{2})	739	
September 2	131,614 acres (533 km^{2})	649	
September 3	131,614 acres (533 km^{2})	569	
September 4	131,614 acres (533 km^{2})	446	

== See also ==
- 2025 United States wildfires
- List of California wildfires
- 2025 California wildfires
