= Ribbonwood, California =

Unincorporated community in California, United States

Ribbonwood Spring Crest
- Unincorporated community
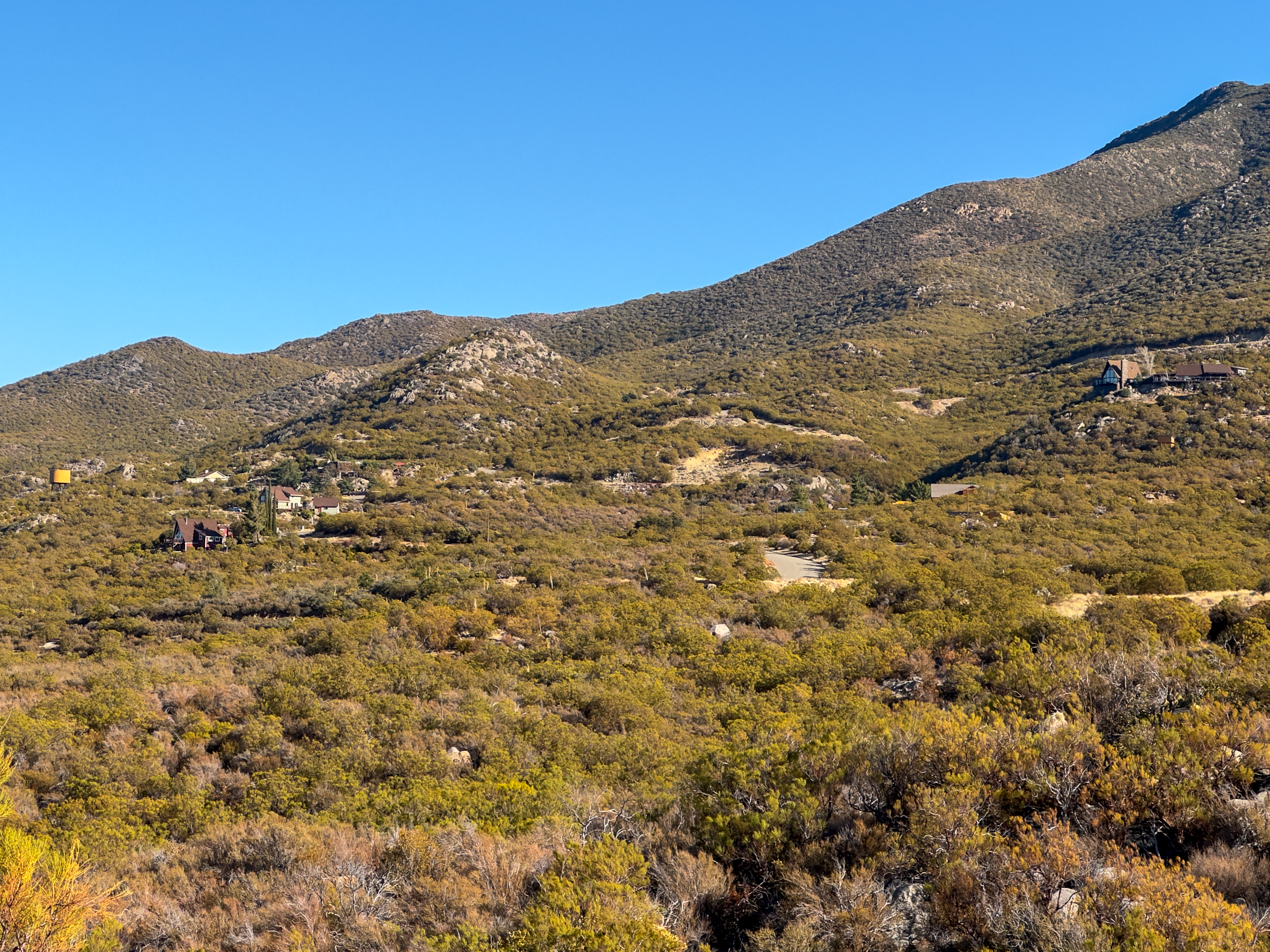
- Ribbonwood, California from Pines to Palms trail

- Location in California Ribbonwood (the United States)
- Coordinates: 33.5703055°N 116.4989043°W
- County: Riverside County
- State: California
- Country: United States
- Elevation: 1,340 m (4,397 ft)

Ribbonwood, is an unincorporated community in Riverside County. It is named after the Ribbonwood tree, Adenostoma sparsifolium, which are prevalent in the area. It is also known as Spring Crest, which is the name of the summit that the community is situated around.

== Geography ==
It is located on the northwestern portion of the Santa Rosa Mountains at an elevation of 4,397 ft. It lies on State Route 74. It is 19 miles west of Palm Desert, California

== History ==
Ribbonwood was founded by Wilson S. Howell, Jr., a pioneer who was born in 1888 in New Jersey. He had originally moved to a ranch near Indio, California, but health issues led him to seek out a place with a milder climate. He chose the site of Ribbonwood, because it was near to the desert that he had grown fond of, but higher in elevation and cooler in temperature. He initially conceived of the site as being a retreat for artists, however he was unable to achieve this goal when he struggled to find partners to fund his enterprise.

In 1927, Howell was involved in the planning process of what is today the Pines to Palms Highway. The plan was for a road to go from Idyllwild Junction to the Indio/Palm Springs area, and it would pass through Howell's property in Ribbonwood. Ribbonwood would become a store and rest stop, run by Howell, along this route.
