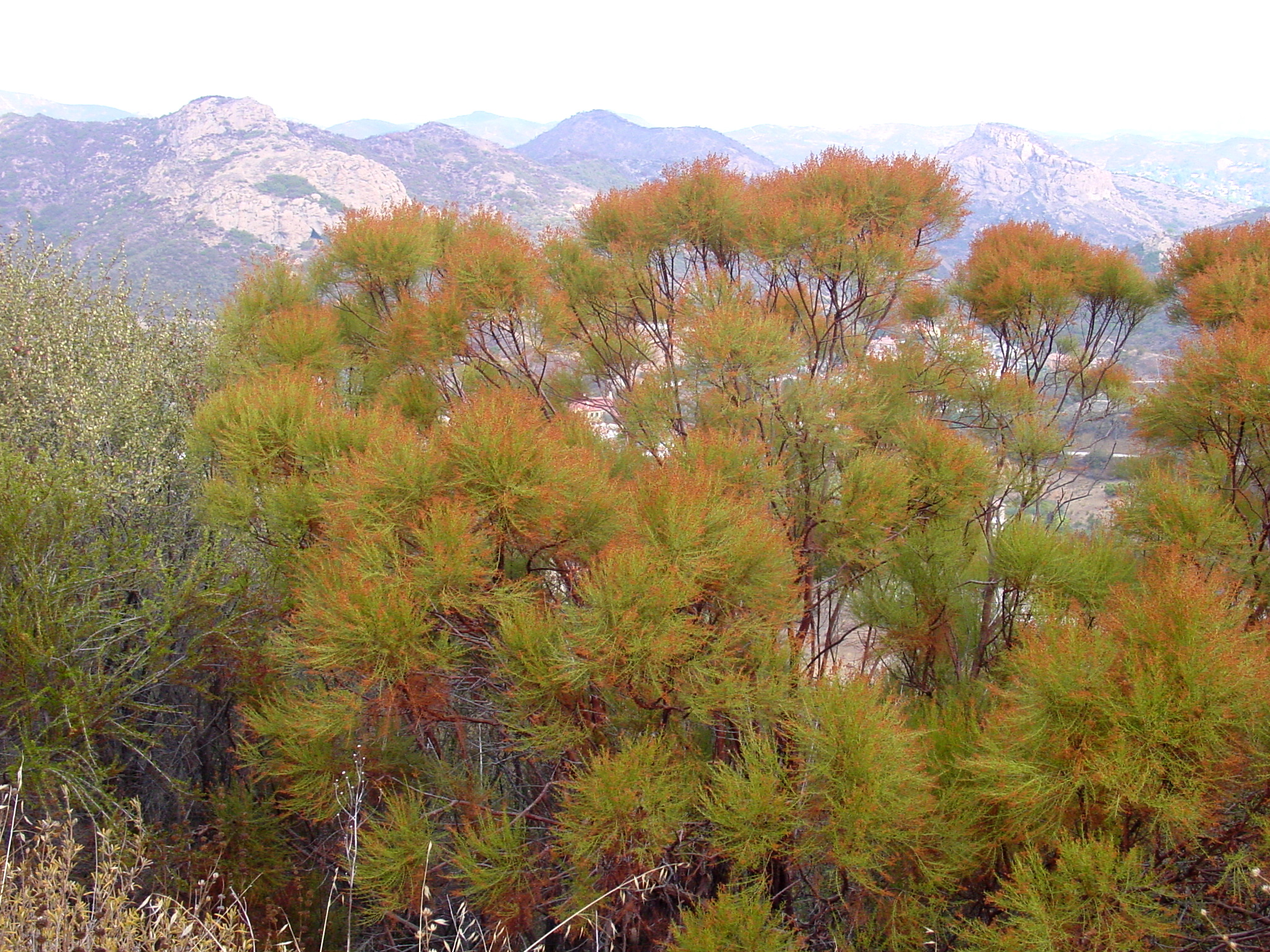

Conservation status
- Apparently Secure (NatureServe)

Scientific classification
- Kingdom: Plantae
- Clade: Tracheophytes
- Clade: Angiosperms
- Clade: Eudicots
- Clade: Rosids
- Order: Rosales
- Family: Rosaceae
- Genus: Adenostoma
- Species: A. sparsifolium

Binomial name
- Adenostoma sparsifolium Torr.

= Adenostoma sparsifolium =

Species of tree

Adenostoma sparsifolium, commonly known as redshanks or less commonly (outside of area of its principal distribution), ribbonwood or ribbon bush, is a multi-trunked tree or shrub native to dry slopes or chaparral of Southern California and northern Baja California.

== Description ==
Shaggy falling shanks or ribbons of bark are one of the strongest characteristics of the Adenostoma sparsifolium tree, hence the common names. It also has many stems originating from one root system that lack foliage until they reach a certain height above the ground. It can range from a shrubs to small multi trunked trees. As the species name "sparsifolium" suggests, it has tiny, pale green, filamentous leaves. Adenostoma sparsifolium usually ranges from 3 to 15 feet with some individuals reaching up to 20 feet. Redshanks are closely related to the more abundant Chamise (Adenostoma fasciculatum). Produces numerous small white flowers and its fruit is an achene.The earliest recorded collection of this species occurred in 1846 near Warner’s Ranch in San Diego County.

== Ecology ==
Redshanks inhabits higher elevations of chaparral just above and below the snowline in the Peninsular Ranges and does best on north-facing "ubac" slopes at around 4,000 feet of elevation. Associates at its lower range include California Scrub Oak and Hoary Ceanothus, and mingles with manzanitas at its upper range.

Like its relative, chamise, it is capable of resprouting after a fire. However, even though the individual Adenostoma sparsifolium pants are resistant to fires, the seeds they produce are poorly adapted to survive them. This is due to the seeds getting destroyed by the heat itself and the fact that redshanks do not germinate well after a fire. Even if the seeds do survive, it is rare that they successfully establish themselves. Many die in the 4 to 9 month dry season typical of mediterranean climates. Additionally, self pollination causes genetic issues for the species. Such as, embryo and endosperm abortion, inbreeding depression, and loss of reproductive fitness. In populations found in the eastern Santa Monica Mountains the embryonic/endosperm abortion rate reaches 97–99%. All these factors are contributing to the overall population decline of Adenostoma sparsifolium.

The root systems of Adenostoma sparsifolium are also very resilient to fires. It was found that overall root density was not affected by fires. In fact, directly after fires fine root density actually increases. However, part of this is likely due to California's wet and dry seasons. With summers being dry and fire prone, and winters being more rainy and wet. This increased root density is hypothesized to result from Increases soil nutrients (from ash), stored carbohydrates in roots, and the wet season that follows many of the fires that happen.

== Uses ==
=== Traditional medicine ===
Redshanks were historically used to by Californios and indigenous Californians to treat a folk illness known as pasmo, now commonly understood as describing lockjaw. The plant would be used both consumed internally and applied externally to treat lockjaw and spasms and later other ailments. Californios also used redshank for colds and snakebites.

It would be boiled into a tea to induce sweating as a possible treatment for paralysis and it would also be administered nasally as a powder, similar to snuff. Redshank tea was consumed internally and applied externally to treat toothaches, gangrene, and colds. In the 1980's, consumption of the tea was reported to have continued as a blood purifier, ulcers, sore throats, colds, urinary tract disorders, and as an external wash for boils and cuts on humans and livestock. Infusions of redshank bark and leaves were made by indigenous groups to treat syphilis. The plant oils were used to relieve skin infections.

Redshanks were also used to make salves. One salve made by mixing the leaves or ground branches with lard or grease was applied to heal sores and treat sore throats; another salve was made by straining a mixture of heated redshank and olive oil.

=== Habitat rehabilitation ===
Redshank can be used to aid in erosion control and restoring disturbed habitats.

== Cultural significance ==
Redshanks had been valued by Californios as a medicinal plant during the Spanish and Mexican California period. It is even suggested that the plant had been exterminated in part of its former range because of over-exploitation. It was used as a remedy for the Latin-American folk illness known as pasmo, giving it the name yerba del pasmo. Pasmo is typically defined as "spasm" or "paralysis", usually in reference to lockjaw, which was thought to result from the rapid chilling of an overheated person's body.

Redshanks were not as important to Chumash people prior to colonization, but was also adopted as a remedy for pasmo, which by the late 20th century was defined as a severe infection or pain caused by air trapped in the body. Later generations expanded its use to treat other conditions.

Ericameria arborescens, which somewhat resembles redshanks, was also sometimes called yerba del pasmo. It is possible that this naming occurred when A. sparsifolium became unavailable locally.

== See also ==
- Ribbonwood, California

== Bibliography ==
- Blanchan, Neltje (2005). Wild Flowers Worth Knowing. Project Gutenberg Literary Archive Foundation.
- Schoenherr, Allan A. (1992). A Natural History of California. University of California Press.
