= Chicken Ranch Casino Resort =

Casino in Tuolumne County, California

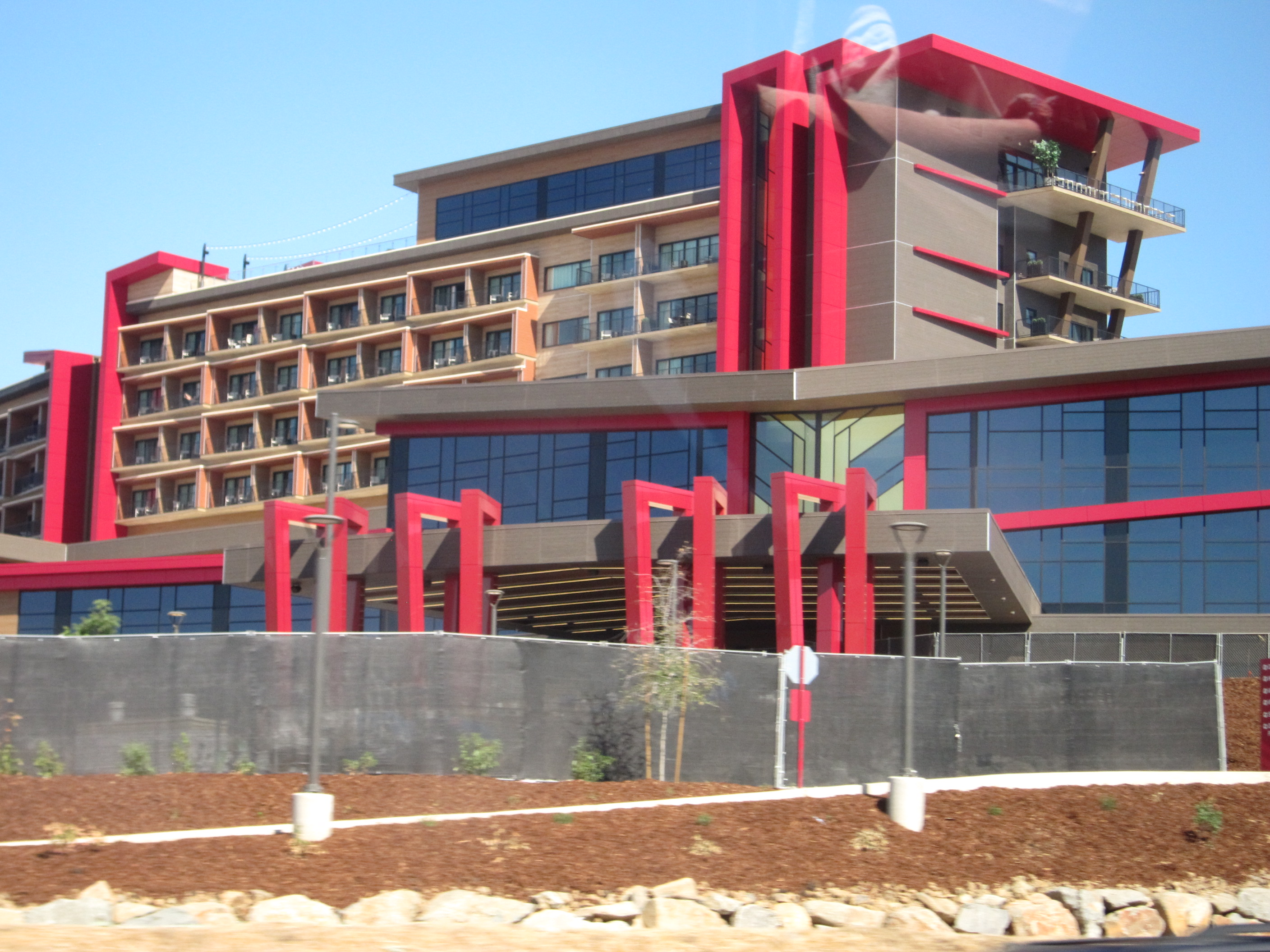
- The Chicken Ranch Casino Resort in 2024, seen from the road
- Location: Jamestown, California, U.S.
- Address: 9100 People of the Mountain Road
- Theme: Western
- No. of rooms: 197
- Casino type: Resort
- Coordinates: 37°55′40″N 120°26′52″W
- Website: chickenranchcasinoresort.com

The Chicken Ranch Casino Resort is a casino resort in Tuolumne County, California, United States. Founded in 1985 as the bingo hall Chicken Ranch Bingo Palace, it is owned by the Chicken Ranch Rancheria of Me-Wuk Indians of California.

The venue installed its earliest casino-like machines in 2000 and went through a remodeling in 2011 to have a Western theme. The casino underwent a $325 million extension in 2024. The new nine-story resort had 197 hotel rooms and several restaurants including a Wahlburgers. The new gaming facility added 900 slot machines and 14 table games.

== History ==
Chicken Ranch Bingo Palace opened on May 31, 1985. The management company Chicken Ranch Bingo Management Inc., which was based in Fresno and led by Wayne Mimms, constructed the building. The business was owned by under 20 relatives belonging to the Mathiesen family of the Chicken Ranch Rancheria of Me-Wuk Indians of California. Made of steel, the prefabricated warehouse occupied 25,000 square feet (2,300 m^{2}) and took roughly $1.4 million to build and equip. Located on Chicken Ranch Road, the bingo hall is positioned north of California State Route 108 and is roughly two miles to the west of Jamestown and four miles to the south of Sonora. The property is located on land that the Native American tribe Miwok previously owned.

When it began operations, the parlor was open from Wednesday through Sunday. According to Don DeMain of the Oakland Tribune, the establishment's opening fit in the gambling trend affecting northern California that was facilitated by crafty legal tactics. Certain federal laws as well as local and state statutes, including gambling ones, did not apply to Indian reservations. Financiers and organizers who saw the opportunity for massive profits, funded rural bingo parlors that attracted urban dwellers from the Central Valley, Sacramento, and the San Francisco Bay Area. California, for instance, imposed a $250 cap per game on bingo payouts supporting non-profit groups. As it is owned by Native Americans, the Chicken Ranch did not follow this limit, instead giving players playouts per game of between $500 and $3,000 in 1992.

The property can accommodate 1,500 people. On the weekend it opened, there were 1,250 visitors. Between 350 and 1,250 people visited the bingo hall in the first two months of operation. The parlor had roughly 100 workers in July 1985. Chicken Ranch Bingo Palace's inaugural month had $1.2 million in revenue, while it paid out $800,000 in prizes. According to their contract with the management company, from the profits, the Native American tribe received 55%. The contract, which had a term of 15 years, specified that the tribe would have an increasing share of the profits as the years progressed. In 1986, the Bureau of Indian Affairs (BIA) revised protocols for how contracts were set for Native American bingo operations. Although the BIA instructed the Chicken Ranch Rancheria to revise their agreements to meet the requirements, Chicken Ranch failed to meet the requirements. After the BIA mandated that the bingo hall shut down, the hall was able to stay operational through managing the hall itself.

In 1998, California governor Pete Wilson signed a gaming compact with the Pala Indian Reservation and ordered that other Native American tribes sign similar agreements that allowed state and local governments to regulate their gambling activities. The governor said that Native American gambling operators who lacked state contracts could have their slot machines seized. Asserting sovereign immunity, Chicken Ranch refused to do so and chose to shut down its 208 slot machines in mid-May but kept running their bingo games. Two weeks later, they reopened their slot machines. The casino initially substituted the slot machines with 30 "video-style machines" that were more insulated from regulatory oversight. Since the players were dissatisfied with the machines, the casino restored the original machines. Slot machines in 1998 generated 80% of the casino's revenue.

Chicken Ranch installed its earliest casino-like machines in 2000. In 2011, the casino underwent a remodeling to give it a Western theme. At the beginning of the COVID-19 pandemic in California in the middle of March 2020, the casino shut down for 2.5 months. To connect with the community, Chicken Ranch used their parking lot to host drive-in cinema. In January 2021, the casino had 283 employees and over 600 slot machines.

Chicken Ranch underwent an extension of its existing facilities in 2024. The casino spent $325 million to construct a nine-story resort housing 197 rooms, restaurants, a gym, a Native American cultural hub, and a 100,000-square-foot (9,300 m^{2}) gaming area. It had 14 table games and 900 slot machines. The existing casino continued operating and allows smoking. Since alcohol is prohibited, players 18 and older are allowed. The freshly launched casino disallowed smoking but had a designated smoking area.

== Ambiance and amenities ==
In 1992, Chicken Ranch had a gift shop that sold Native American and bingo memorabilia. 600 arrowheads were showcased on a wall. A second wall featured photos of players who won large payouts. Ron DeLacy of The Modesto Bee in 1998 described the casino as having a tranquil environment, linoleum flooring, and plastic seating. Servers made rounds serving coffee rather than alcoholic beverages. According to DeLacy, "this isn't like the glitz of Lake Tahoe or Las Vegas. It's more like a warehouse the size of a football field with bingo tables and slot machines".

In 2021, Chicken Ranch housed two restaurants: Ranch House Restaurant and the café bistro The Roost. After the casino underwent an extension in 2024, it opened the eateries Perch Rooftop Dining, Quill Bar, Trailblazer Coffee Co., (209) Sports Bar + Kitchen, and Wahlburgers.
