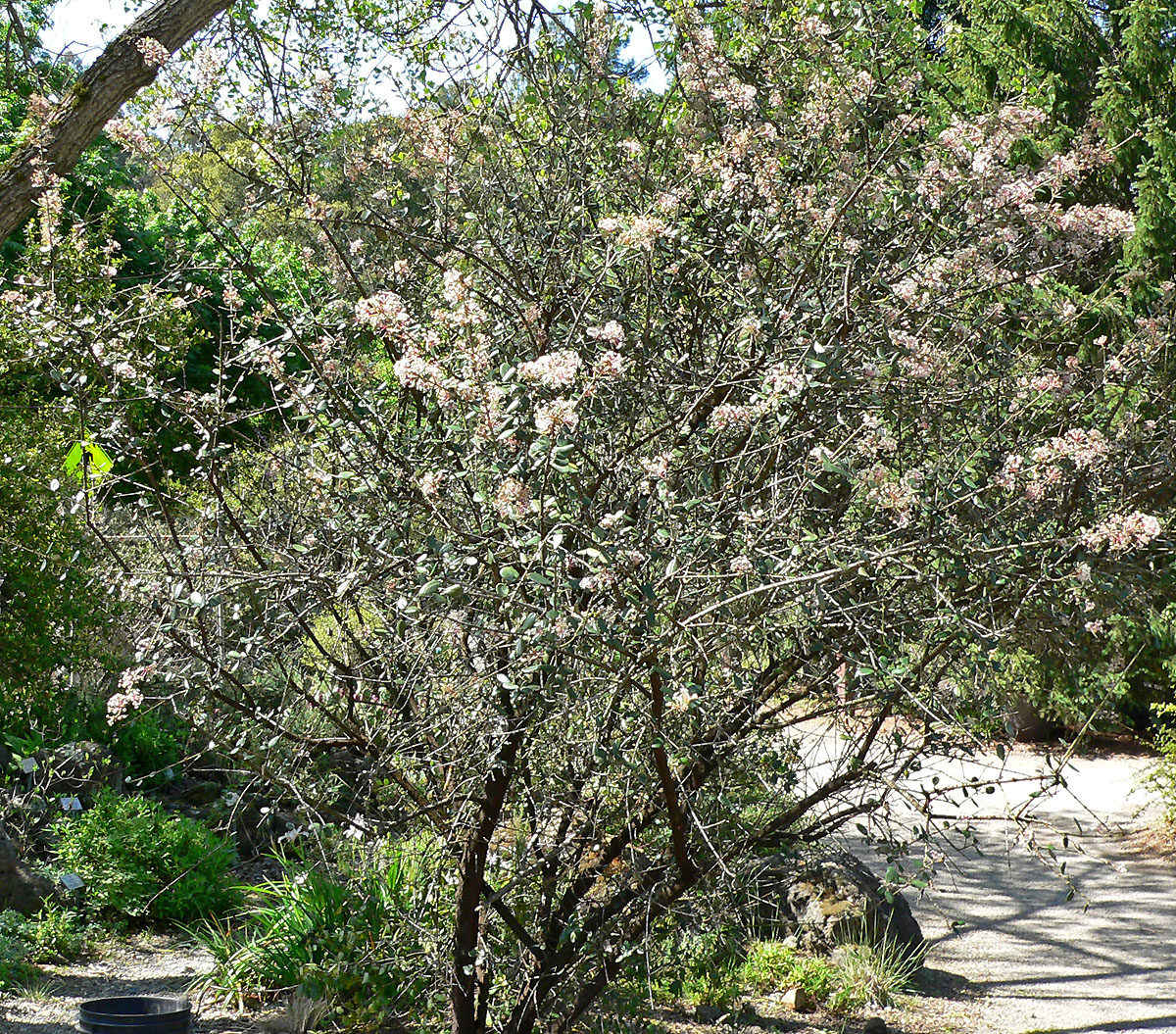

Conservation status
- Least Concern (IUCN 3.1)

- Vulnerable (NatureServe)

Scientific classification
- Kingdom: Plantae
- Clade: Tracheophytes
- Clade: Angiosperms
- Clade: Eudicots
- Clade: Rosids
- Order: Rosales
- Family: Rhamnaceae
- Genus: Ceanothus
- Subgenus: C. subg. Cerastes
- Species: C. crassifolius

Binomial name
- Ceanothus crassifolius Torr.

Varieties
- Ceanothus crassifolius var. crassifolius; Ceanothus crassifolius var. planus Abrams

Synonyms
- Ceanothus verrucosus var. crassifolius (Torr.) K.Brandegee

= Ceanothus crassifolius =

Hoaryleaf ceanothus

Species of flowering plant

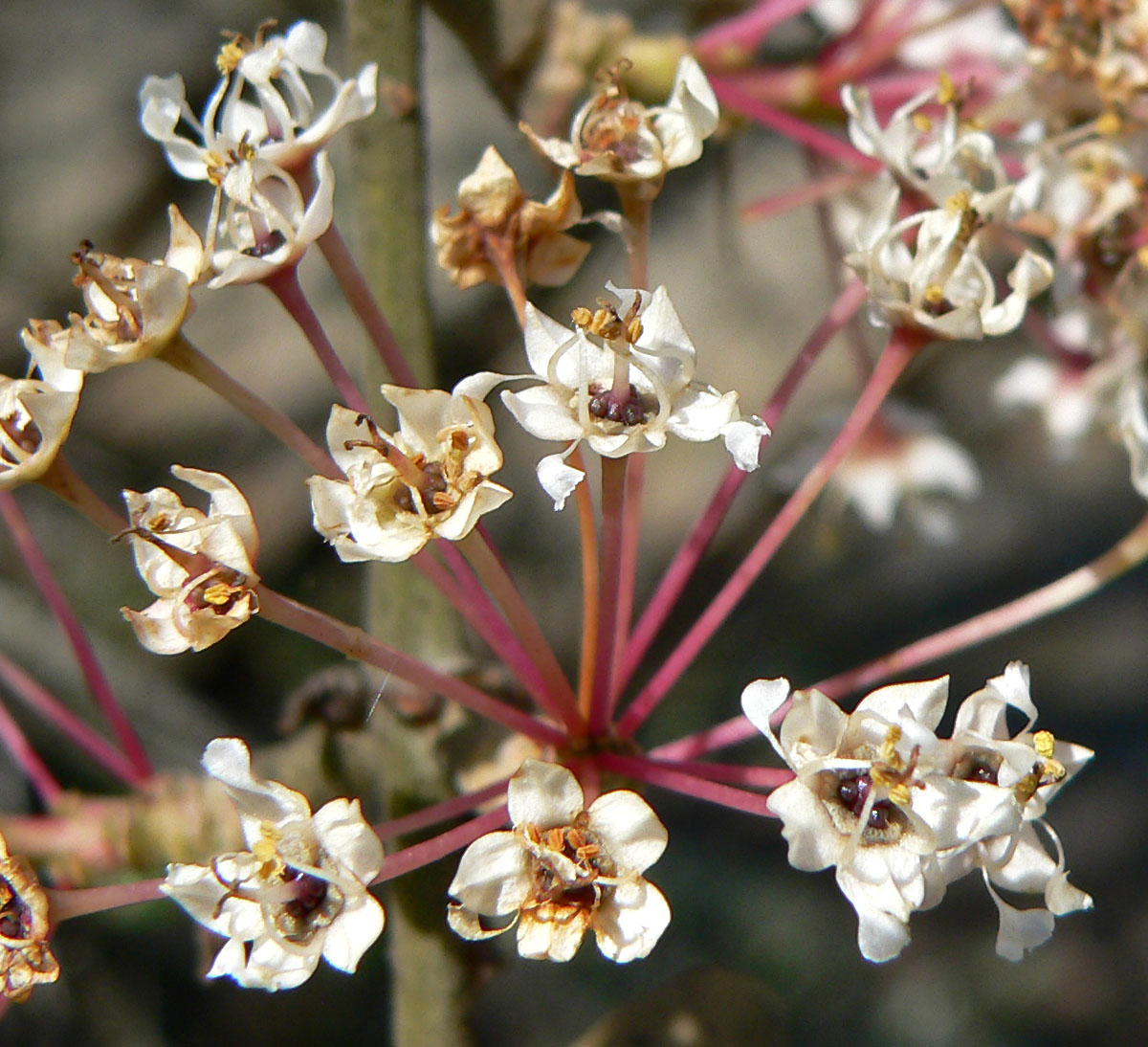
Flowers of Ceanothus crassifolius

Ceanothus crassifolius is a species of flowering shrub known by the common name hoaryleaf ceanothus. This Ceanothus is found throughout the coastal mountain ranges of the southern half of California, and its range extends into Baja California.

Two varieties are accepted.

- Ceanothus crassifolius var. crassifolius
- Ceanothus crassifolius var. planus Abrams

== Distribution ==
Ceanothus crassifolius typically occurs in coastal and montane California chaparral habitat associations. Common flora associates are Toyon (Heteromeles arbutifolia) and Hollyleaf cherry (Prunus ilicifolia). The mountain range systems it is found in include the Southern California Coast Ranges, the Transverse Ranges, and the Peninsular Ranges.

== Description ==
Ceanothus crassifolius is an erect, spreading shrub which can exceed 3 metres (9.8 ft) in height. The branches become long and the younger twigs are fuzzy with white or light brown hairs. The small evergreen leaves have widely spaced teeth along the edges and the undersides are lighter in color and coated with hairs.

The inflorescences are borne on short stalks less than three centimeters long and are small and rounded with tiny white flowers. They can be quite dense and can cover branches thickly, or they may be sparse. The flowers are white, though may have a yellowish or pink tint.

The fruit is a horned capsule less than a centimeter wide.
