= Deer Creek Fire =

2025 Utah and Colorado wildfire

- Part of the 2025 Utah and Colorado wildfire seasons
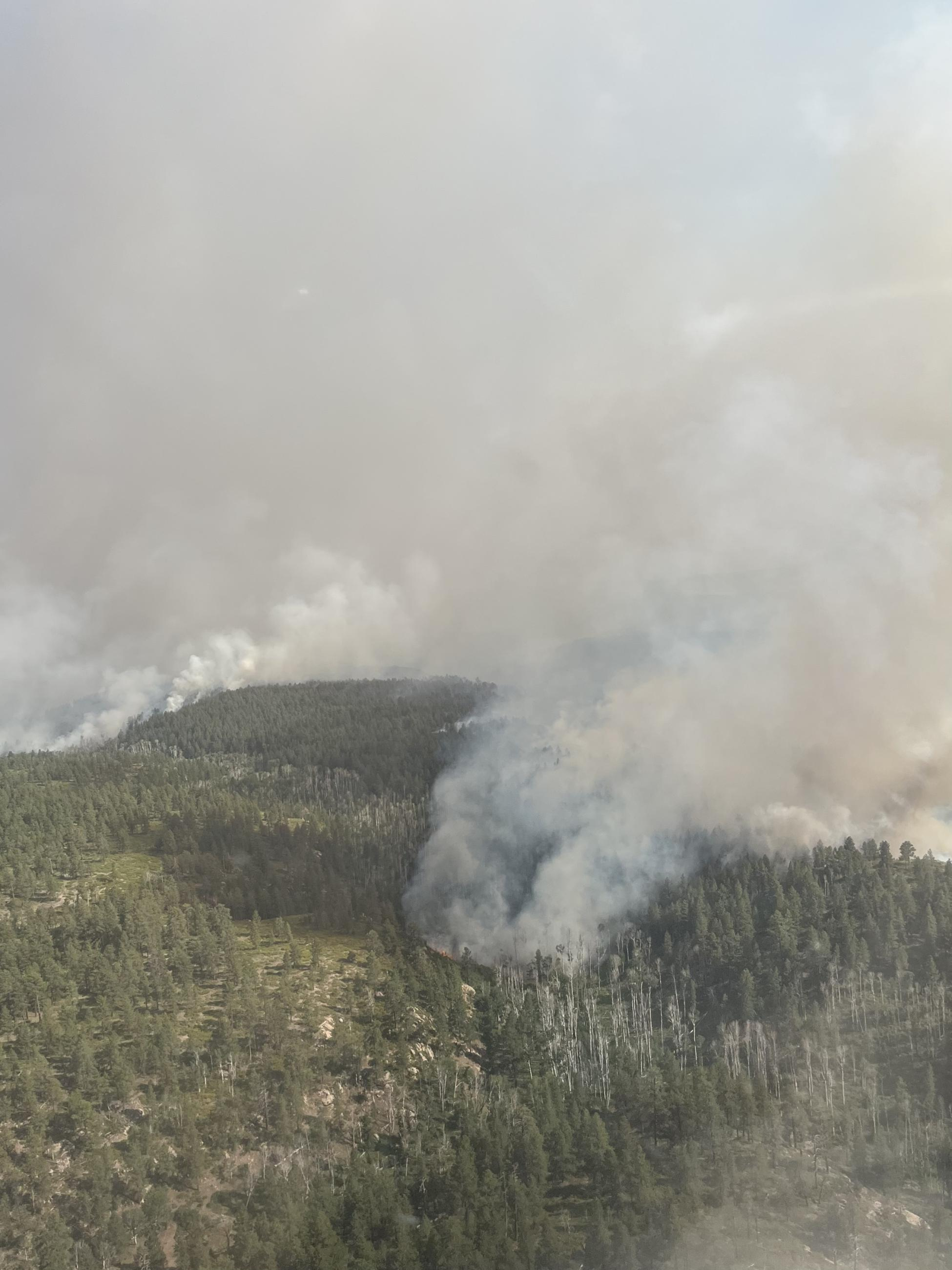
- Smoke from the Deer Creek Fire on July 14
- Date: July 10 -; August 11, 2025; (32 days)
- Location: San Juan County, Utah and Montrose County, Colorado, United States

Statistics
- Perimeter: 100% contained
- Burned area: 17,724 acres (7,173 ha; 71.73 km^{2}; 27.694 sq mi)

Impacts
- Deaths: 0
- Injuries: 0
- Structures destroyed: 13 total
- Cost: >$24 million (2025 USD)

Ignition
- Cause: Debris burn or ashes from a cooking/warming fire

Map
- Perimeter of Deer Creek Fire (map data)

The Deer Creek Fire was a fast-moving, destructive wildfire that burned 1 mile (1.6 km) north of La Sal, Utah, United States. The human-caused wildfire ignited on July 10, 2025, and quickly grew to over 4,000 acres (1,600 ha) that night. On July 12, the blaze generated a rare fire whirl, which damaged one fire engine. The fire crossed over into Montrose County, Colorado, on July 15. Higher humidity and weakened winds slowed fire growth and aided fire suppression efforts later in July, and evacuations were lifted in Montrose County on August 8. The Deer Creek Fire reached 100% containment on August 11, after burning 17,724 acres (7,173 ha; 71.73 km^{2}) and destroying 13 structures.

== Background ==
Strong winds influenced the formation of a fire tornado over the Deer Creek Fire. Strong wind gusts coming off the La Sal Mountains, flowing over the mountains like a river over rocks. The mountains disrupted the wind, creating a body of swirling air, spinning flames into the mostly stationary fire tornado. Rugged terrain and limited road access complicated fire suppression efforts.

== Cause ==
The Deer Creek Fire was first reported around 3 pm on July 10, 2025 near State Route 46. After an investigation, the San Juan County Sherriff released in a statement on July 21 the fire was human-caused, and a suspect was identified. Charges were filed against 68-year-old Scott Carrier of Salt Lake City in connection with the fire's ignition. Carrier stated he burned piles of sagebrush in winter, but did not burn around the time of the fire. The probable cause of the Deer Creek Fire was a pile of debris burning or discarded ashes from a warming or cooking fire, with two origin spots detected.

== Progression ==
=== July ===
The Deer Creek Fire was reported around 3 pm on July 10, estimated at 50 acres (20 ha). State Route 46 was closed, and those within 5 miles (8.0 km) of the fire were asked to evacuate. The blaze spread to an estimated 200–600 acres (81–243 ha) by that evening. Winds were gusting up to 35 miles per hour (56 km/h), with humidity as low as 6%. The fire rapidly spread, reaching 4,000 acres (1,600 ha) by the next morning. Several structures had been impacted, and the fire was driven by hot, dry, windy conditions. Crews prioritized in structure protection near the south and west edges of the perimeter. That afternoon, size increased to 6,684 acres (2,705 ha), still at 0% containment. Four homes, five outbuildings, and power infrastructure had been destroyed. Twenty homes remained threatened, and 250 residents were evacuated. By July 12, several more crews arrived at the fire that day, and size increased to 8,300 acres (3,400 ha). Winds were spreading the fire into heavily forested areas.

While terrain-driven winds drove the fire closer to the Utah/Colorado border, making the fire 8,925 acres (3,612 ha) on July 13, flames moved into the Hangdog Creek Fire burn scar of 2002, and fire intensity reduced. The fire's southern edge remained less active and had not spread, holding on State Route 46. The fire jumped to 10,058 acres (4,070 ha), still at 0% containment despite over 300 personnel on the fire. Firing operations were completed, removing vegetation in the fire's path. Air quality levels in Moab reached unhealthy levels due to the fire's smoke. Despite this, fire lines around the perimeter were strengthened from slackening winds and more suppression resources arriving, mostly along the southwestern edge.

While the Deer Creek Fire grew to roughly 12,900 acres (5,200 ha) and crossed the Colorado state line, 7% containment was achieved. While over 400 personnel were assigned to the fire, containment remained at 7% and size increased to 14,760 acres (5,970 ha) on July 16. An evacuation order in San Juan County was lifted, and a checkpoint would be at the entry road. Size jumped to 15,655 acres (6,335 ha) the next day. The fire was burning through live, dead, and downed aspen, and the dry fuel in the dead and downed trees fueled the fire. A Temporary Emergency Closure was affecting roads near Paradox, Colorado.

Containment increased to 11% July 18 from cooler conditions, cloud cover, and lighter winds, despite the fire expanding to 15,819 acres (6,402 ha). While some evacuations were lifted in Utah, pre-evacuations were issued for residents in Colorado. Isolated rain on the southeast part of the fire, which contributed to containment raising to 17%. More evacuees were permitted to return home. Firing operations occurred along the northern edge in Colorado, as progress was made in the southeast area with containment to 22%. Still, the fire grew to 16,340 acres (6,610 ha).

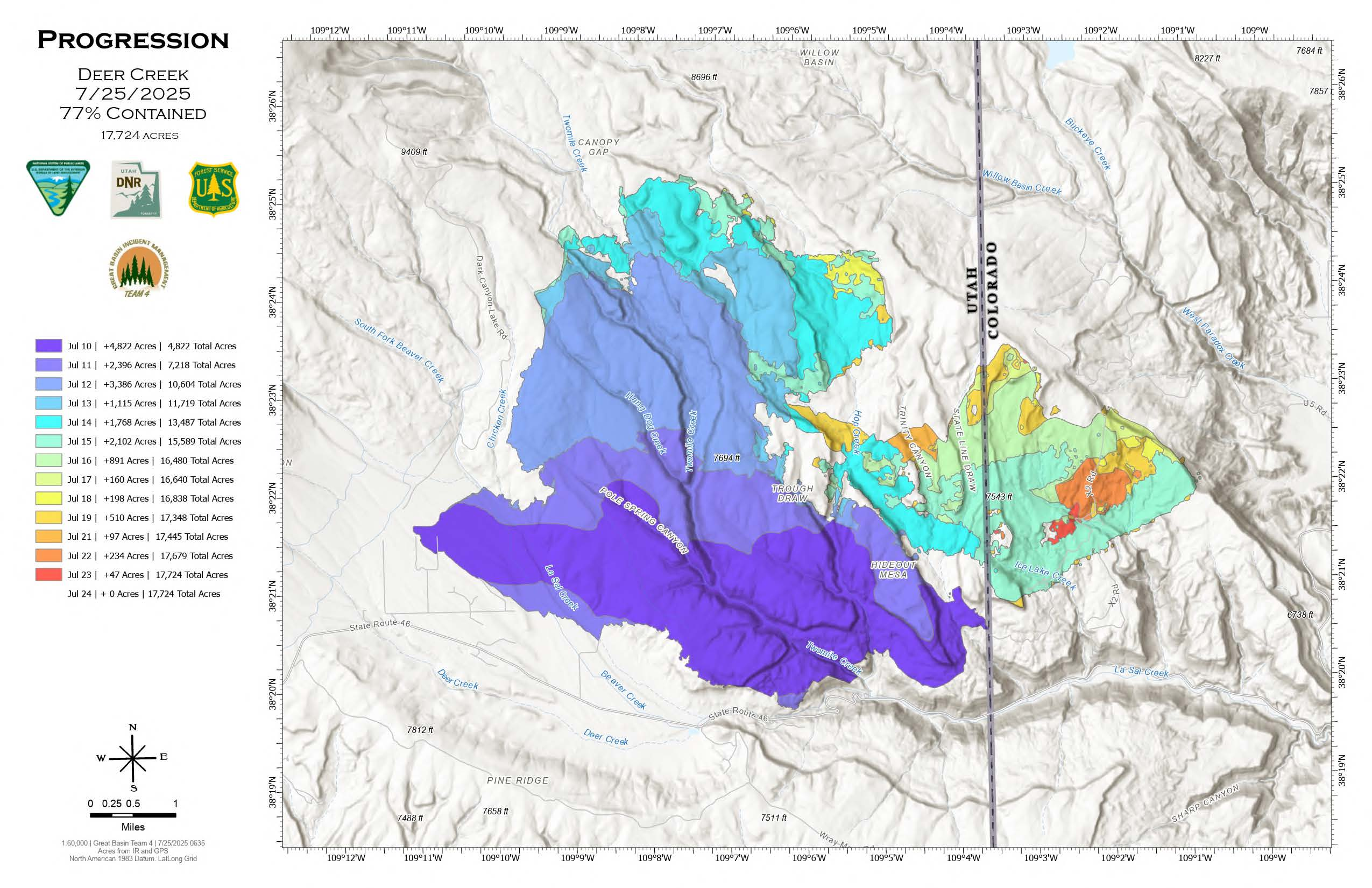
Progression map on July 25

While the Deer Creek Fire grew slightly to 17,184 acres (6,954 ha), weakened winds, lower temperatures, higher humidity, and cloud cover helped crews increase containment to 54% by the morning of July 22. These weather conditions allowed some crews to move from suppression to restoring the landscape on the western edge. That evening, size and containment increased to 17,304 acres (7,003 ha) and 77%, respectively, again due to decreasing temperatures. By the next day, size increased to 17,724 acres (7,173 ha).

==== Fire tornado ====
The Deer Creek fire had produced a significant fire-generated convective system, a relatively rare phenomenon that forms when a sufficiently large wildfire generates strong updraft and convection. According to research from the United States Forest Service and the Texas A&M AgriLife Extension Service, the intense convective heat coming up from the fire, and the up-canyon winds collided with northerly winds created an area of rotation in the area, which led to the formation of a fire tornado.

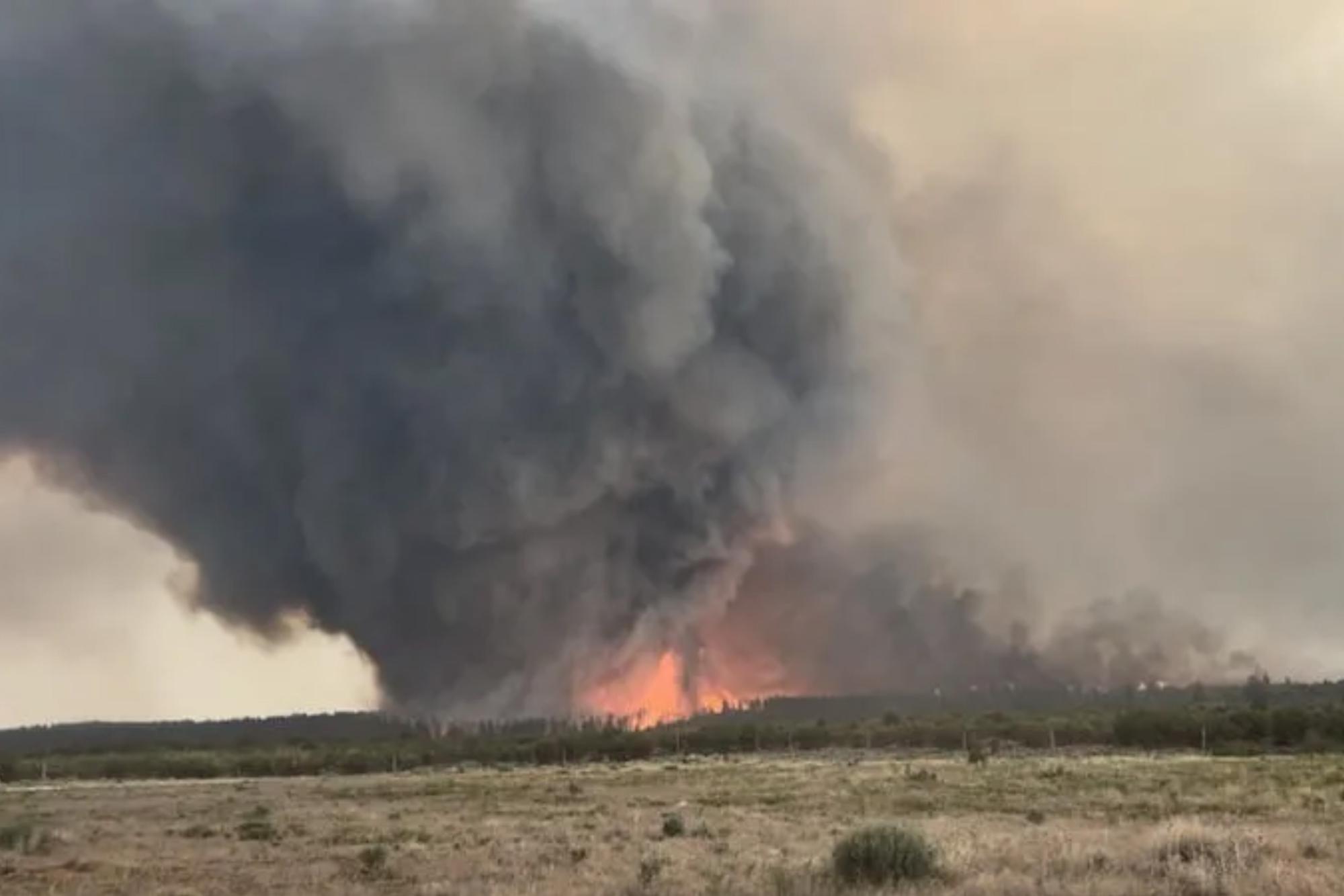
The fire tornado near peak intensity

The tornado touched down in the La Sal mountain range near the small town of La Sal at approximately 1:03 PM MDT, between Two-Mile Creek and Hang Dog Creek. The circulation started rapidly intensifying and began to rotate counterclockwise as it moved northwest. The tornado turned west towards Hang Dog Creek. After crossing the creek, it made a sharp turn south, tracking through the Hang Dog subdivision, where its wind and flames destroyed several structures. One residential structure with "very well established defensible space" had its windows blown out and a portion of its roof ripped off. A heavy property gate was pulled out of the ground and tossed down that road. The Structure Division Task Force Leader reported flames reaching out from the main column estimated at 250–300 feet (76–91 m). Debris and vegetation were visibly sucked up. One fire engine parked approximately 0.25 miles (0.40 km) from the tornado. The tornado, being at a near stationary speed hit a two-story family home at low-end EF2 intensity, ripping off most of the roof before hitting and setting fire to an outbuilding. The tornado became stationary near an outbuilding and the parked engine at 1:09 pm. Video was recorded of the inside and central core of the storm as it hit the fire engine. After hitting and setting fire to an outbuilding, firefighters inside of a fire engine recorded the last moments of the tornado on top of them, showing the fire particles whipping around the fire engine. The tornado soon thereafter dissipated just east of Forest Road 201.

An image of the two-story family home hit by the tornado at EF2 intensity.

Following the tornado's dissipation, multiple buildings that the tornado had hit caught fire. The fire engine sustained damage to its air line, resulting in a loss of tire pressure. On August 11, 2025, the fire was fully contained by Utah first responders, after a month and a day of fighting the fire. The cost of the fire suppression exceeded $24 million dollars (USD). Throughout the 12 minute-duration of the tornado, no reported fatalities or injuries occurred.

=== August ===
Firefighters made progress on the fire, and containment jumped to 93% by August 3. As containment increased to 97% five days later, all evacuation levels in Montrose County were lifted. However, some evacuations remained in Utah near Old La Sal.

100% containment was achieved on the Deer Creek Fire on August 11, and remaining evacuations were lifted in San Juan County. Crews would remain on scene to monitor the fire.

== Effects ==
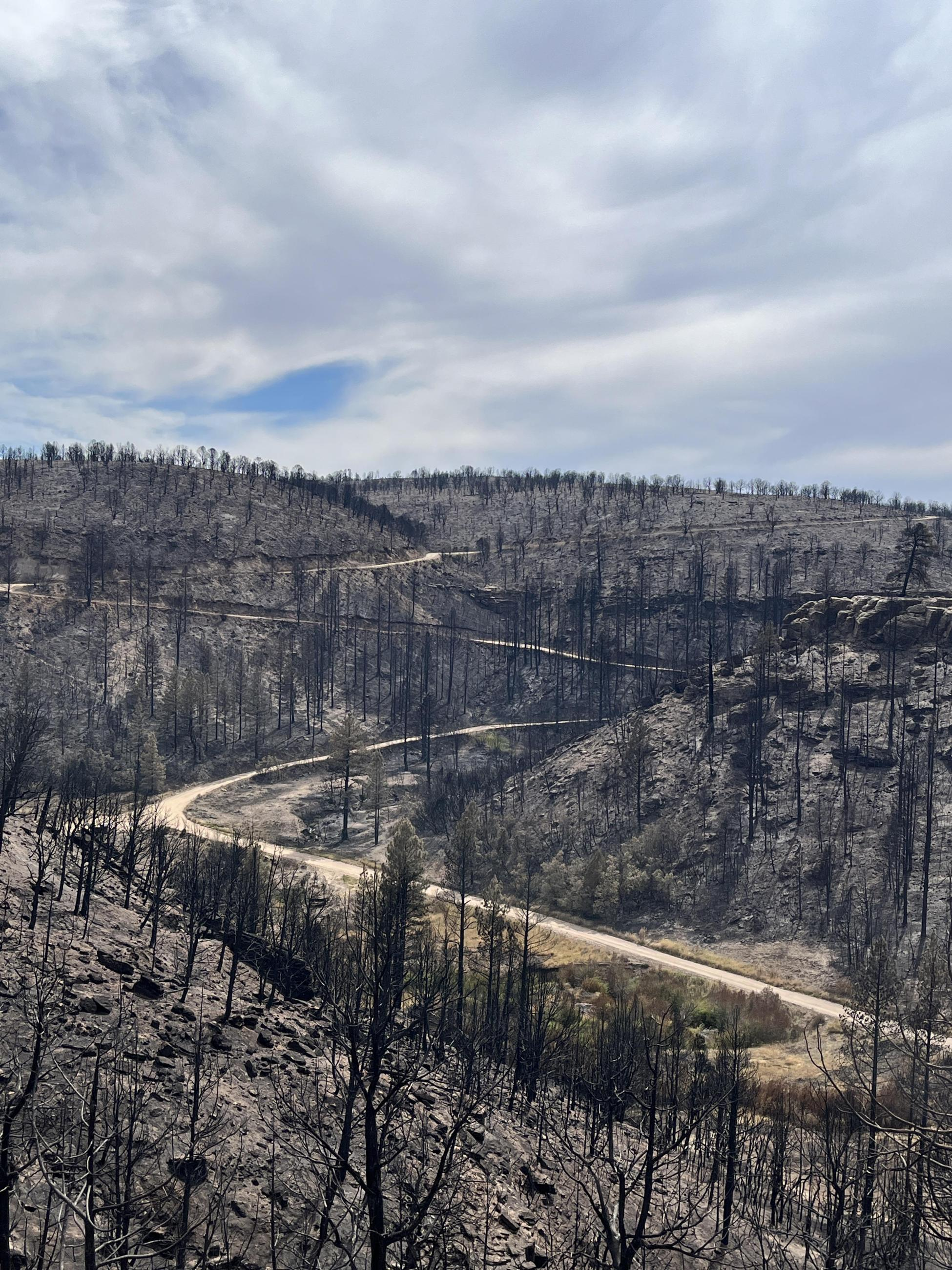
Burned trees from the Deer Creek Fire

A total of thirteen structures were destroyed by the Deer Creek Fire, including eleven residential structures, a United States Department of Agriculture structure, and a communications site. Several structures received wind damage from the fire tornado, rating it EF2 on the Enhanced Fujita Scale.

The River Canyon Wireless transmission tower was destroyed, which was an Internet source for residents who relied on Wi-Fi to call. Residents had to temporarily move from Old La Sal to La Sal, Utah for another transmission tower or rely on fiber-optic communication or satellite Internet. Power was restored on July 23.

Suppression efforts cost slightly over $24 million. Costs on ranching are expected to cost at least $1 million, in terms of hay, fencing and structures destroyed, and destruction of pasture lands.

Residents were ordered to evacuate in Old La Sal, parts of Montrose County, Colorado, and anyone within five miles of the blaze. Utah State Route 46 was closed during the fire. A forest closure affected parts of the Moab Ranger District in Manti-La Sal National Forest until August 15.

Heavy equipment operators began repairing environmental damage to forest roads and access points by July 24, and overall, officials stated rehabilitation work once finished will have lasted weeks or months.

== Growth and containment table ==
Fire containment status Gray: contained; Red: active; %: percent contained;
Date	Area burned	Personnel	Containment
July 10	4,000 acres (1,600 ha; 6.3 sq mi)	. . .	
July 11	7,000 acres (2,800 ha; 11 sq mi)	100	
July 12	8,300 acres (3,400 ha; 13.0 sq mi)	. . .	
July 13	8,925 acres (3,612 ha; 13.945 sq mi)	300	
July 14	10,058 acres (4,070 ha; 15.716 sq mi)	300	
July 15	12,906 acres (5,223 ha; 20.166 sq mi)	385	
July 16	14,760 acres (5,970 ha; 23.06 sq mi)	415	
July 17	15,655 acres (6,335 ha; 24.461 sq mi)	451	
July 18	15,819 acres (6,402 ha; 24.717 sq mi)	485	
July 19	15,892 acres (6,431 ha; 24.831 sq mi)	524	
July 20	16,340 acres (6,610 ha; 25.53 sq mi)	552	
July 21	17,123 acres (6,929 ha; 26.755 sq mi)	579	
July 22	17,184 acres (6,954 ha; 26.850 sq mi)	581	
July 23	17,648 acres (7,142 ha; 27.575 sq mi)	524	
July 24	17,724 acres (7,173 ha; 27.694 sq mi)	470	
–
August 11	17,724 acres (7,173 ha; 27.694 sq mi)	. . .	

== See also ==
- 2025 United States wildfires
- Forsyth Fire – Burned in southwestern Utah at a similar time
- Elk Fire – Burned further north in Colorado at a similar time
- Lee Fire – Burned further north in Colorado at a similar time
- Monroe Canyon Fire – Burned in central Utah at a similar time
- South Rim Fire – Burned further north in Colorado at a similar time
- Wildfires in 2025
- Air quality in Utah
