= 2025 Utah wildfires =

Natural disasters in the USA

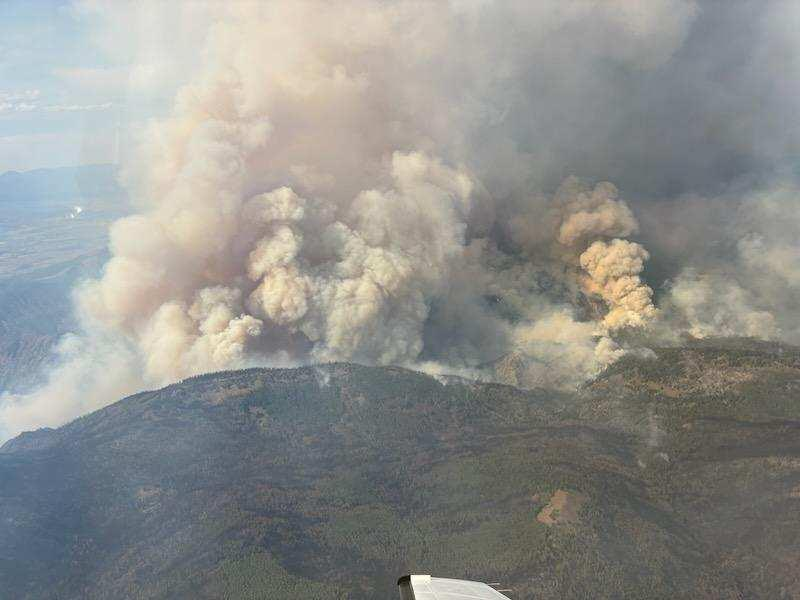
- Monroe Canyon Fire burning up the North Slope of Monroe Creek on July 25, 2025

Statistics
- Total fires: 1,159
- Total area: 164,874 acres (66,722 ha; 667.22 km^{2}; 257.616 sq mi)

A series of wildfires burned throughout the U.S. state of Utah during 2025.

== Background ==
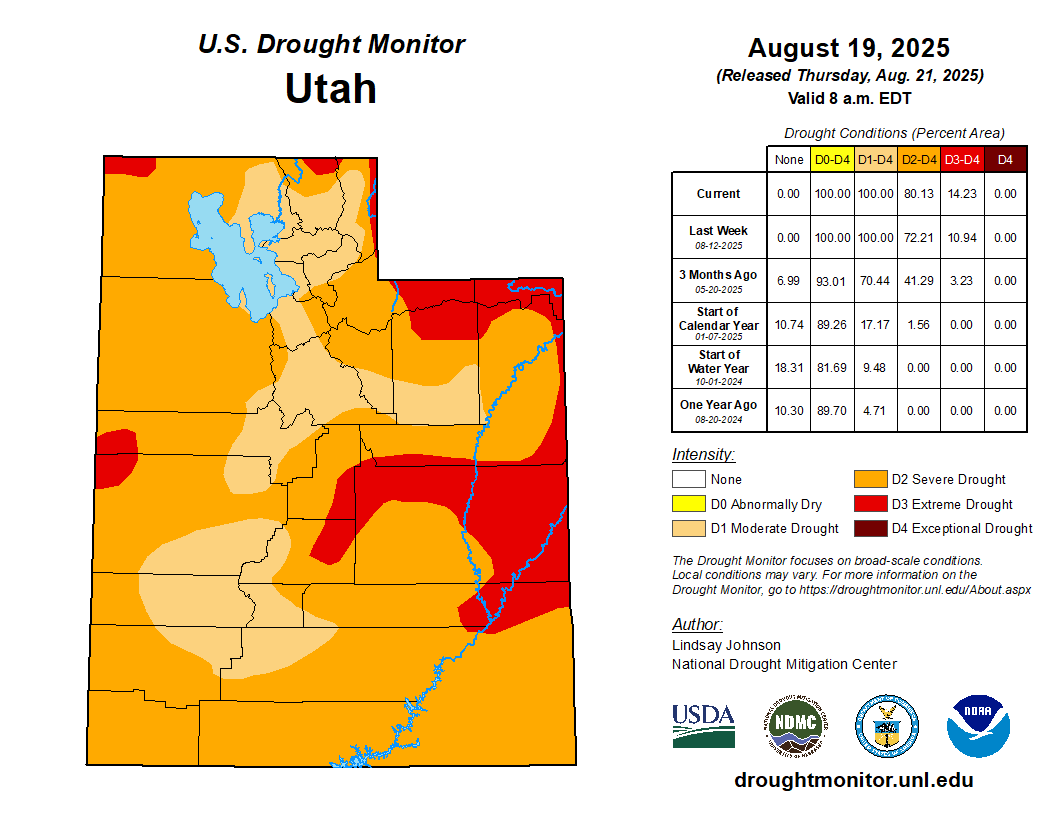
Utah Drought Monitor on August 19, 2025

While the typical wildfire season in Utah varies, most fires occur in between July and October. Fire conditions can heavily depend on monsoons that last from late June to September. Dry monsoons can allow fires to start and spread easier, while wet ones can cause fire relief. Additionally, hot temperatures and overall dry conditions play a large role.

== Summary ==
Utah's 2025 wildfire season has been unusually intense and active. As of mid-season, the state has recorded over 1,100 wildfires, with total acreage burning reaching well into the six-figure range.

One of the most significant incidents is the Monroe Canyon Fire, burning across Sevier and Piute counties. By August, it had grown to about 70,000 acres, making it the season’s largest Utah fire to date.

Another major blaze, the France Canyon Fire in Garfield County, consumed 34,943 acres before containment.

The Forsyth Fire near St. George, ignited by lightning, burned approximately 15,662 acres and destroyed fourteen residential structures and four outbuildings.

Conditions fueling the fire activity include above-average heat, low humidity, strong winds, and extended dry spells. These factors have exacerbated fire spread, hampered suppression efforts, and caused smoke impacts across broad areas.

Additionally, the fires have at times produced their own intense weather phenomena, including pyrocumulus / "fire cloud" development, which can result in erratic winds and complicate firefighting operations.

== List of wildfires ==
The following is a list of fires that burned more than 1,000 acres (400 ha), or produced significant structural damage or casualties.

Name	County	Acres	Start date	Containment date (Note: Containment means that fire crews have established and secured control lines around the fire's perimeter. These lines are artificial barriers, like trenches or cleared vegetation, designed to stop the fire's spread, or natural barriers like rivers. Containment reflects progress in managing the fire but does not necessarily mean the fire is starved of fuel, under control, or put out.)	Notes	Ref
Hag	Box Elder	2,700	June 5	June 7	Human-caused. Burned 38 miles (61 km) northwest of Grantsville.	
Forsyth	Washington	15,662	June 9	August 7	Lightning-caused. Burned in Pine Valley.	
France Canyon	Garfield	34,943	June 11	July 23	Lightning-caused. Burned about 7 miles (11 km) southeast of Hatch.	
Bridge Creek	San Juan	2,588	June 13	July 21	Lightning-caused. Burned about 55 miles (89 km) northwest of Page, Arizona.	
Mica	Tooele	1,500	July 8	July 19	Human-caused. Burned 15 miles (24 km) west of Dugway.	
Deer Creek	San Juan, Montrose (CO)	17,724	July 10	August 11	Human-caused. Burned just north of La Sal and has destroyed twelve houses. Generated a mesocyclonic fire tornado which was rated EF2.	
Monroe Canyon	Sevier, Piute	73,721	July 13	September 4	Undetermined cause. Prompted evacuations near Monroe.	
Beulah	Summit	5,719	August 7	September 25	Burned near Mirror Lake Highway 3 miles (4.8 km) in Uinta-Wasatch-Cache National Forest. Prompted evacuations for campers near Coalville.	
Big Springs	Tooele	1,486	August 9	August 11	Human-caused. Burned 3 miles (4.8 km) south of Interstate 80.	

Perimeters of 2025 Utah wildfires (map data)

== See also ==
- 2025 United States wildfires
