= South Rim Fire =

2025 wildfire in Colorado, US

- Part of the 2025 Colorado wildfires
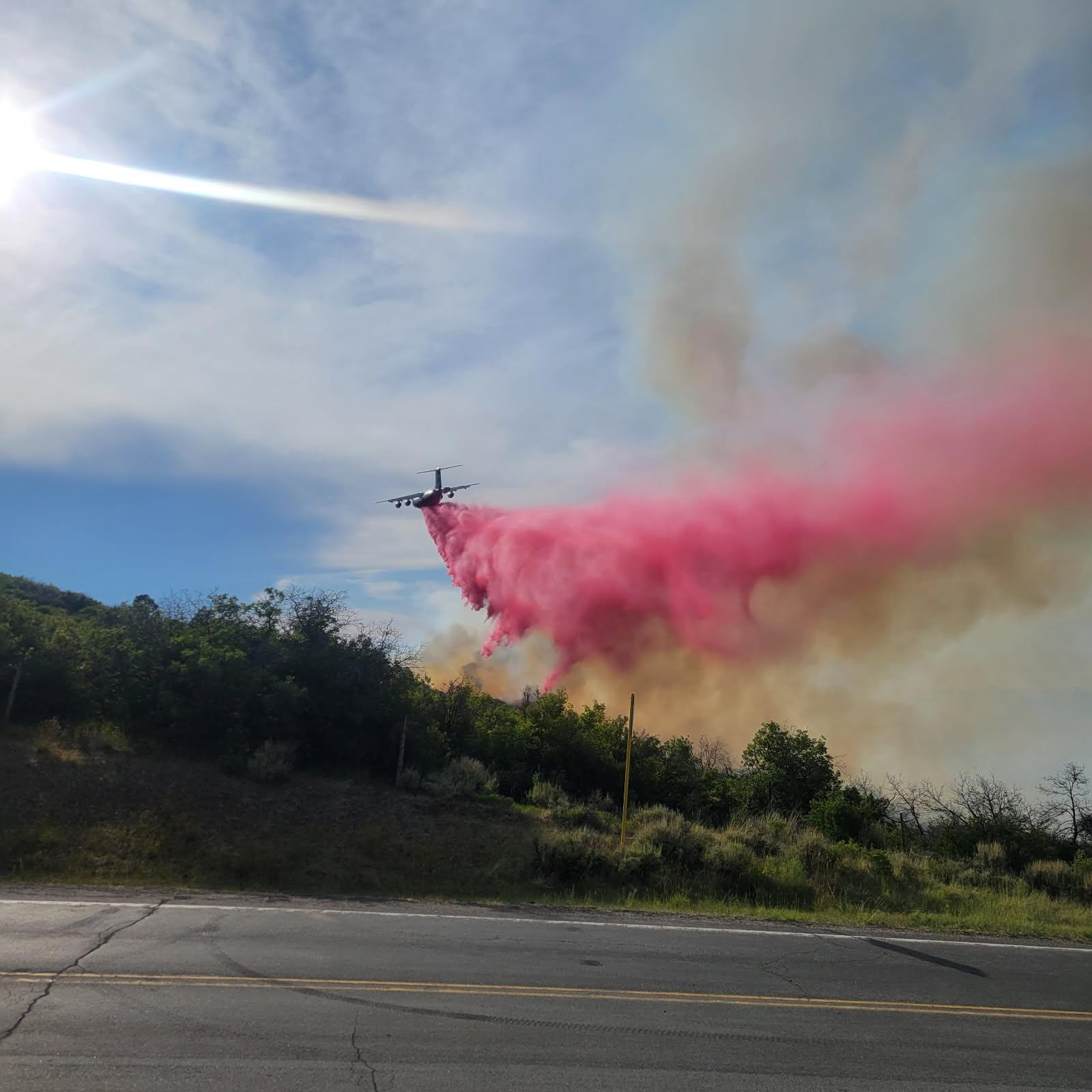
- A plane dropping fire retardant on the blaze on July 11
- Date: July 10 –; September 18, 2025; (70 days)
- Location: Black Canyon of the Gunnison National Park, Colorado, US
- Coordinates: 38°33′29″N 107°43′9″W

Statistics
- Perimeter: 100% contained
- Burned area: 4,232 acres (1,713 ha; 17.13 km^{2})

Impacts
- Deaths: 0
- Injuries: 1
- Structures destroyed: 6 main, several visitors facilities, several campsites
- Cost: $15.3 million in suppression (2025 USD)

Ignition
- Cause: Lightning

The South Rim Fire was a wildfire that burned in Black Canyon of the Gunnison National Park, Colorado, United States. The fire ignited on July 10, 2025, from a lightning strike; the national park was completely closed, and visitors were evacuated. Ultimately, the fire destroyed at least six structures, including structures owned by the National Park Service and visitor facilities. The South Rim Fire reached 100% containment on September 18, after burning a total of 4,232 acres (1,713 ha; 17.13 km^{2}).

== Background ==
Around the time the South Rim Fire ignited from lightning on July 10, high temperatures as high as 90 °F, extremely low humidity and moisture, and strong winds complicated suppression efforts and increased the fire's growth rate and spread. The fire burned in steep, rugged, and inaccessible terrain, which complicated suppression efforts. Additionally, crews could not safely go into the canyon to determine whether all the hot spots had been extinguished, so complete containment was not easily confirmed until precipitation moved into the area.

== Cause ==
On July 10, a dry thunderstorm swept through Black Canyon of the Gunnison National Park, starting two wildfires. One, the North Rim Fire, was controlled with without much problem, but the South Rim Fire escalated and spread out of control. The thunderstorm ignited twelve other wildfires in that dispatch area.

== Progression ==
=== July ===
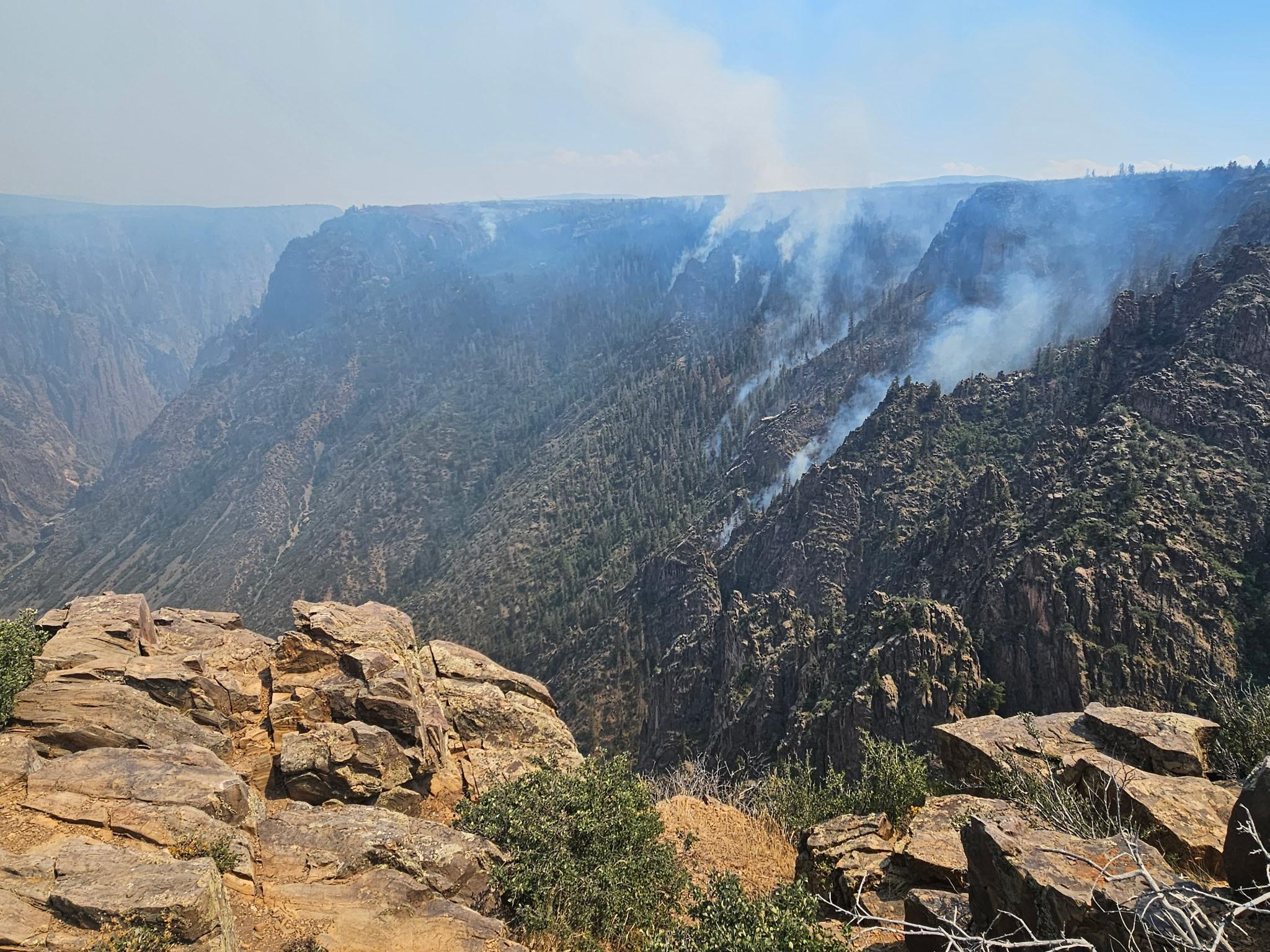
The South Rim Fire burning in Black Canyon of the Gunnison National Park, viewed on July 11

The South Rim Fire started on July 10 from dry lightning strikes. Black Canyon of the Gunnison National Park was closed, and all visitors and staff were evacuated from the area. The Colorado State Patrol was called in to evacuate campers in the area. A red-flag warning was in effect until 8 pm that night. The fire spread overnight into the next morning, reaching a size of 1,460 acres (590 ha) by the morning of July 11. Another red-flag warning remained in place until 8 pm that night as well, from gusty winds, low humidity levels, and dry brush. More evacuations were put into place that night, and State Route 347 was closed except for local traffic. While protection efforts for the visitor center was successful, separate park equipment and outbuildings were destroyed. Over 300 firefighters, including some dispatched from Oregon, were combating the blaze.

The fire remained active and rapidly spread on July 12, nearly doubling in size after spreading to 2,892 acres (1,170 ha). Crews prioritized on minimizing spread into the canyon, and hot, dry weather remained a major factor in spread. Governor Jared Polis declared a state of emergency on July 13 as the fire expanded to 3,758 acres (1,521 ha). Concerns were around critical infrastructure, and the Blue Mesa Reservoir was closed to aide aerial crews. Separately, disaster declaration were issued for Montrose, Mesa, and Delta counties for the South Rim, Turner Gulch, and Sowbelly Fires. Growth was observed mostly on the southeastern edge of the blaze, which was where most crews were stationed.

The fire grew overnight to 3,556 acres (1,439 ha), fueled by winds gusting up to 40 mph (64 km/h) and dry grasses on the northwestern area, while containment remained at 0%. Up until then, suppression cost $3.6 million. The next day, while original estimates placed the fire at just 77 acres (31 ha) above July 14's estimate, a thunderstorm moved over the area, creating gusty winds and causing the blaze to rapidly spread. Heavy smoke was whipped up, causing visibility issues for the firefighters. However, retardant drops on the northern edge of the perimeter helped crews gain control in that area. Once calculations were finished, it was confirmed the South Rim Fire was now 4,160 acres (1,680 ha) large.

Crews were extinguishing hot spots around the fire's perimeter. Officials struggled on how to extinguish heat on the northwestern edge of the fire in very steep terrain, and began to evaluate several options to extinguish hot spots in those areas. However, containment reached 12% on July 18, along the southwestern edge where damage was sustained to the South Rim of Black Canyon of the Gunnison. Cloud cover and cooler temperatures aided the containment efforts, even though crews could not safely drop into the canyon and relied on aerial crews for certain areas.

On July 19, a firefighter removing trees with a chainsaw severely injured his left hand. Containment grew to 14%, and officials investigated and went through Black Canyon of the Gunnison National Park. Up to seven national park employees were relocated to Curecanti National Recreation Area. Containment increased to 21%, while size grew to 4,252 acres (1,721 ha), and over 500 firefighters were fighting the blaze whose spread had noticeably slowed down. The closure for Blue Mesa Reservoir was lifted later that day, and State Route 347 reopened. Favorable weather aided firefighter's efforts to dig fire lines around the perimeter, further increasing containment to 31%.

It was announced that North Rim of Black Canyon of the Gunnison National Park would reopen to visitors a week after July 26. Officials stated containment could remain low due to steep and inaccessible terrain. Containment increased to 41% by July 29, but dangerous terrain for firefighters forced personnel to use drones to detect hot spots. On July 30, management of the fire transitioned to a Type 4 incident management team, where suppression efforts would occur with local materials and personnel.

=== August and September ===
Despite receiving heavy winds, hail, and lightning on July 31, crews managed to raise containment to 52% by August 2. The only fire activity smoldering inside the fire's perimeter in inaccessible areas. The United States Forest Service stopped providing updates on the South Rim Fire due to the dangerous and inaccessible terrain on August 10.

The South Rim of Black Canyon reopened on August 18, although several campgrounds and trails remained closed to the public. Containment further increased to 60% that day, and suppression mostly involved monitoring the fire's perimeter. 24-hour operations resumed at the South Rim, and more viewpoints and the main road reopened on August 29.

On September 18, 2025, crews achieved 100% containment on the South Rim Fire, after burning a total of 4,232 acres (1,713 ha). The South Rim Fire cost $15.3 million in suppression efforts.

== Effects ==
Park infrastructure for Black Canyon of the Gunnison was heavily damaged or destroyed. Most of the 88 campsites on the South Rim were destroyed, along with a large observation deck, seven toilets, and a warehouse with heavy equipment. Several other main buildings were also demolished. While removing trees with a chainsaw on July 19, one firefighter severely injured his left hand from the blade.

Black Canyon of the Gunnison National Park was entirely closed after the fire started. The North Rim reopened on July 30, and the South Rim began to reopen on August 18. The main road and more lookout points fully reopened on August 29. On the evening of July 11, evacuations were issued for all visitors and staff of Black Canyon of the Gunnison National Park and residents in surrounding areas. State Route 347 was closed at the junction with U.S. Route 50.

The South Rim Fire prompted an air quality advisory for Southwest Colorado, including Grand Junction, Silverton, and Lake City. The burn scar of the fire poses a risk of mudslides, rockfalls, and debris flow, which is a threat to anyone in the East Portal of Black Canyon.

== Growth and containment table ==
Fire containment status Gray: contained; Red: active; %: percent contained;
Date	Area burned	Personnel	Containment
July 10	1,640 acres (660 ha; 6.6 km^{2})	. . .	
July 11	1,640 acres (660 ha; 6.6 km^{2})	. . .	
July 12	2,896 acres (1,172 ha; 11.72 km^{2})	72	
July 13	3,556 acres (1,439 ha; 14.39 km^{2})	190	
July 14	3,633 acres (1,470 ha; 14.70 km^{2})	330	
July 15	3,988 acres (1,614 ha; 16.14 km^{2})	299	
July 16	4,160 acres (1,680 ha; 16.8 km^{2})	420	
July 17	4,179 acres (1,691 ha; 16.91 km^{2})	458	
July 18	4,227 acres (1,711 ha; 17.11 km^{2})	457	
July 19	4,251 acres (1,720 ha; 17.20 km^{2})	540	
July 20	4,252 acres (1,721 ha; 17.21 km^{2})	510	
July 21	4,220 acres (1,710 ha; 17.1 km^{2})	514	
July 22	4,220 acres (1,710 ha; 17.1 km^{2})	450	
July 23	4,220 acres (1,710 ha; 17.1 km^{2})	383	
July 24	4,220 acres (1,710 ha; 17.1 km^{2})	373	
July 25	4,230 acres (1,710 ha; 17.1 km^{2})	317	
July 26	4,232 acres (1,713 ha; 17.13 km^{2})	255	
July 27	4,232 acres (1,713 ha; 17.13 km^{2})	169	
July 28	4,232 acres (1,713 ha; 17.13 km^{2})	102	
July 29	4,232 acres (1,713 ha; 17.13 km^{2})	99	
July 30	4,232 acres (1,713 ha; 17.13 km^{2})	95	
July 31	4,232 acres (1,713 ha; 17.13 km^{2})	84	
. . .	. . .	. . .	. . .
August 19	4,232 acres (1,713 ha; 17.13 km^{2})	. . .	
. . .	. . .	. . .	. . .
September 18	4,232 acres (1,713 ha; 17.13 km^{2})	1	

== See also ==
- Bucktail Fire
- Elk Fire
- Lee Fire
- List of Colorado wildfires
- 2025 United States wildfires
- Wildfires in 2025
