= Monroe Canyon Fire =

2025 wildfire in Utah, US

- Part of the 2025 Utah wildfires
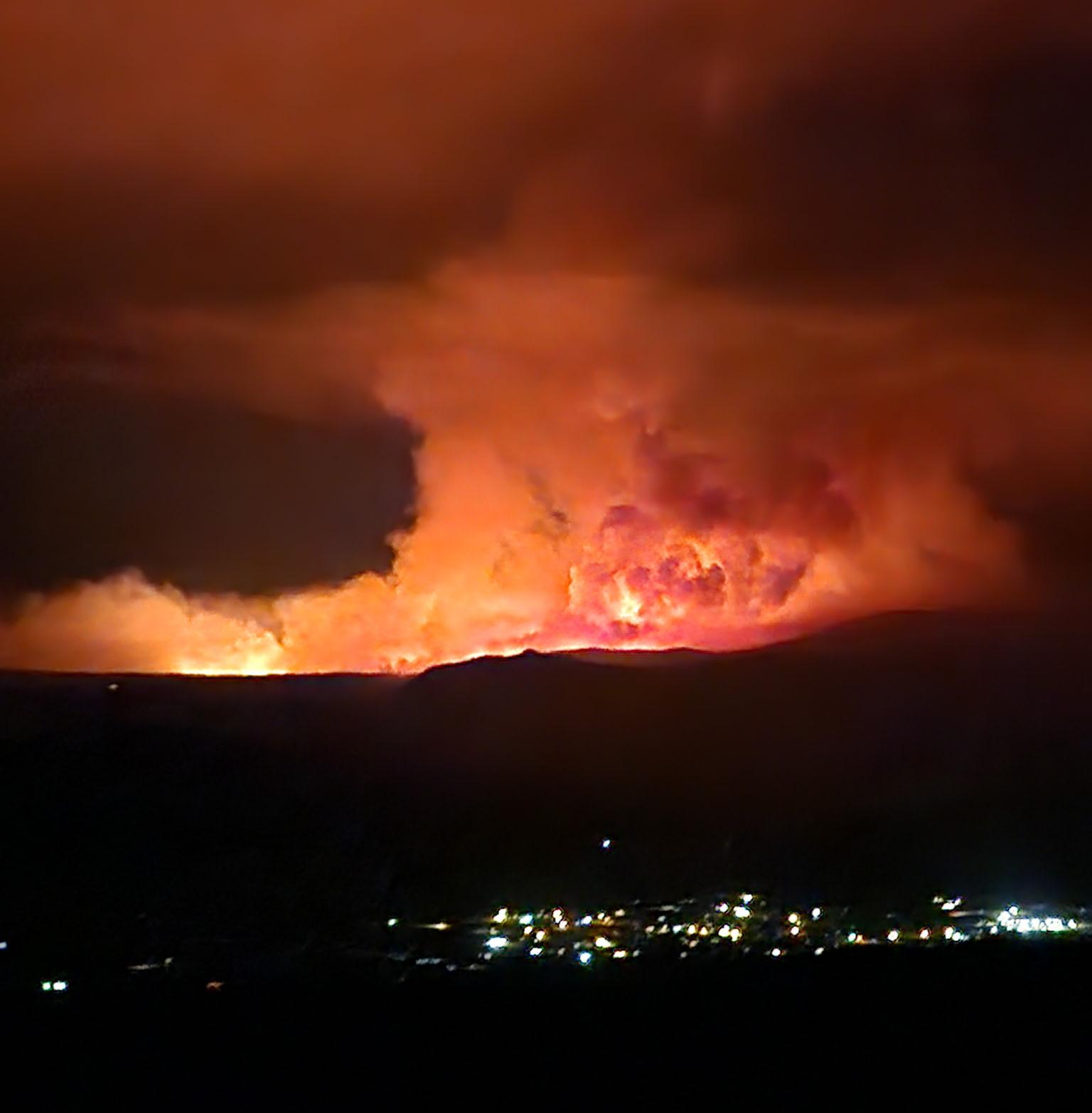
- The Monroe Canyon Fire viewed around midnight on July 25 behind Monroe, Utah
- Date: July 13 –; September 5, 2025 (54 days)
- Location: Sevier and Piute counties, Utah, US
- Coordinates: 38°33′41″N 112°04′48″W

Statistics
- Burned area: 73,721 acres (29,834 ha; 298.34 km^{2})

Impacts
- Deaths: 0
- Injuries: 0
- Structures destroyed: 10 residential
- Cost: $103 million (suppression, 2025 USD)

Ignition
- Cause: Human

Map
- Perimeter of the Monroe Canyon Fire (map data)

The Monroe Canyon Fire was a large and destructive wildfire that burned 3 miles (4.8 km) east of Monroe, Utah, United States. The blaze ignited on July 13, 2025, and may have originated from human activity. The fire was fueled by drought conditions, strong winds, and terrain conducive to fire spread. By the time the fire was fully contained, 73,721 acres (115.189 sq mi; 298.34 km^{2}) burned and ten residential structures were destroyed.

After ignition on July 13, evacuations were ordered for the fire's immediate area and smoke was visible from Interstate 70. After a rapid spread to 8,900 acres (3,600 ha; 13.9 sq mi), rain began to calm down fire activity on July 16. Strong winds and dry conditions influenced the Monroe Canyon Fire's rapid spread on July 26, ultimately forming a pyrocumulonimbus cloud on July 31. Containment increased to 86% by August 25, and month-long evacuation orders were lifted. On September 5, crews achieved 100% containment on the 73,721 acres (29,834 ha; 115.189 sq mi) large blaze.

== Background ==
Humidity levels were extremely low, around 5%, and fuel moistures were at historically low levels around 8%. High temperatures around 90 °F, and winds were persisting at 27 miles per hour (43 km/h), gusting up to 35 miles per hour (56 km/h), all factors contributing to red flag warnings. Wind gusts at times were reported over 60 miles per hour (97 km/h), and steep terrain influenced the fire's spread and challenged suppression efforts.

=== Role of historical prescribed burns ===
Fishlake National Forest performed extensive prescribed burning on Monroe Mountain in the decade before the Monroe Canyon Fire. Native aspen populations were restored inside the burn units. From 2020–2025, the Fishlake National Forest led the intermountain region in acres treated with prescribed fire. A key element of their approach was to pioneer the use of slash lines, in order to safely achieve forest stand replacement.

Aspen is naturally resistant to fire. Despite fourteen straight days of red flag fire weather conditions, the prescribed burn areas successfully slowed and steered the wildfire away from communities, including Annabella and Koosharem. This bought firefighters time to protect homes and reduced the final size of the wildfire.

== Cause ==
The Monroe Canyon Fire ignited after 2:30 pm on July 13, 2025, along Monroe Mountain. A man was seen driving a UTV along Monroe Mountain that afternoon, and authorities were looking for him as possibly linked to the fire's ignition. The cause is human-related, however, the official cause remains under investigation.

== Progression ==
=== July ===
After the fire's ignition after 2:30 pm on July 13, evacuations were ordered for the communities of Monroe Meadows and Magleby, with an estimated 50 to 60 structures threatened. Monroe Canyon Road was closed. Immediate hot and dry conditions, as well as heavy timber fuel, influenced the fire's rapid spread to 700 acres (280 ha) by the morning of July 14. Smoke became visible from Interstate 70, and officials asked residents to avoid the area. Crews were pulled from around the state and from other fires. Search and rescue teams were sent to clear roads and aid with evacuations. 189 personnel were assigned to fight the now 1,248 acres (505 ha) blaze, and structure protection was the top priority during suppression efforts. A complex incident management team was ordered. As the fire's size increased to 3,900 acres (1,600 ha) by July 15, the Type 3 Incident Management Team assumed control at 6 am. Despite cooler temperatures at night, strong winds and conducive fire conditions kept the Monroe Canyon Fire active overnight into the day. Residents between Elk County Cabins and Big Lake were told to "start getting your belongings and personal items out. You might not get another chance other than today."

The Monroe Canyon Fire's rapid spread continued, as the size increased to 8,600 acres (3,500 ha) by July 16. Two cabins were reported destroyed. Fire crews were responding from Idaho, Wyoming, and Nevada. However, fire activity calmed down when 0.2 inches (5.1 mm) of rain fell over the fire. Overall, fire activity was beginning to moderate. Weather conditions favorable for suppression efforts, allowing firefighters to establish lines along the southwestern edge of the fire and prevent spread on July 18. Near Manning and Monroe Mountain, structure protection efforts included wetting vegetation around buildings, while utilizing sprinklers and water tanks were strategies used near Magleby. Helicopters assigned to the fire were temporarily diverted to a new, smaller fire that started on July 19 in the previously burned area.

While rain helped suppression and 3% containment was achieved, it was considered "a drop in the bucket" during suppression on July 20. Now considered the top priority wildfire in the United States, fire officials announced the blaze may not be extinguished until a season ending event in September or October. Instead of one large fire, there were about fifty known small, separated wildfires in the burn area. Over 900 personnel were fighting the fire over 10,000 acres (4,000 ha), now 9% contained. Even though 82 structures were threatened by the fire, there were no evacuations. Four structures were destroyed by July 24. Evacuations were reinstated for Big Lake, Deep Lake, and Long Flat due to increased fire activity. Forecasts predicted the fire to spread north; a line was drawn on the rim of Monroe Canyon, and firing operations would be used for suppression strategies.

Significant growth occurred overnight into July 26, when the fire's size increased to 20,870 acres (8,450 ha). The blaze made a 5 miles (8.0 km) advance north. Firefighters were forced to withdraw from areas to ensure their safety from 60 miles per hour (97 km/h) wind gusts. Crews focused on extinguishing spot fires reported up to five miles away from the main fire. The area near Magleby remained a concern for firefighters due to gusty winds and dry fuels conducive to spot fires. Burnout operations helped slow the Monroe Canyon Fire's spread on July 27. July 28 experienced the hottest temperatures while fighting the blaze since the fire began, nearly 90 °F at 7,000 feet (2,100 m) in elevation.

Critical fire conditions during red flag warnings led to containment dropping to 13%, and new evacuations were ordered as transmission towers were destroyed. Briefly on July 30, State Route 24 was closed due to poor visibility conditions. The fire became the largest wildfire in Utah in five years once it reached 36,637 acres (14,826 ha). Conditions on July 31 were like a "tinderbox" throughout the state. 60 mile per hour winds were present, and several firefighters were forced to use chainsawas to cut through trees while escaping from the fire. The structure toll increased to seven. Containment decreased to 7%, and satellite images from NASA proved the blaze had grown over 46,000 acres (19,000 ha). A thirty-day state of emergency was declared by Governor Spencer Cox. A pyrocumulonimbus cloud formed over the large blaze over the fire that week, creating winds before it collapsed in on itself.

=== August and September ===
Erratic winds and extremely dry conditions persisted, leading to the blaze's growth to 55,542 acres (22,477 ha). August 1 was a relatively calmer day for the fire, however, containment dropped to 4%. A red flag warning period was extended to 10 pm on August 2, and power was lost to residents in Bear Valley. August 3 was the first day in nine days without a red flag warning. While the fire made a northwards run into areas of previous prescribed burns, flames ended up burning back into itself and being put out. Another run occurred but was stopped once it reached the area of a 2016 prescribed burn. Cooler temperatures and weaker winds led to crews reaching 13% containment on August 4, and prescribed burns slowed the Monroe Canyon Fire's spread. Even though evacuations were lifted for Burrville, conditions remained beneficial for fire activity for the now 63,653 acres (25,759 ha) blaze.

A cold front brought cooler conditions on August 8, changing wind patterns to blow in from the northwest. The winds made the fire run into itself on the western and northern ends, but was more problematic on the southern edge. Containment increased to 19%. The fire grew to 71,554 acres (28,957 ha), but despite the persistent growth and possibility of lightning into August 9, containment jumped to 36%. Successful suppression efforts continued, and on August 15, 52% containment was achieved. Cloud cover aided firefighters, who were still prioritizing on protecting critical infrastructure in Burrville, Monroe, Glenwood, and Annabella.

Lightning posed a safety risk to firefighters, prompting them to be pulled off the fire. Cloud cover and cooler temperatures led to the fire's primary activities smoldering and creeping. As containment increased to 86% on August 21, focus changed to suppression repair efforts in Koosharem and Magleby. Two helicopters were released to fight other blazes throughout the state. Moisture was expected to increase due to the monsoon. Evacuations ordered on July 25 were lifted one month later in Bear Valley and Bagleby Ranch. Land owned by the State and Bureau of Land Management reopened.

The Monroe Canyon Fire reached 100% containment on September 5, after burning 73,721 acres (29,834 ha). Closure orders for Fishlake National Forest would be reduced on September 6.

== Effects ==
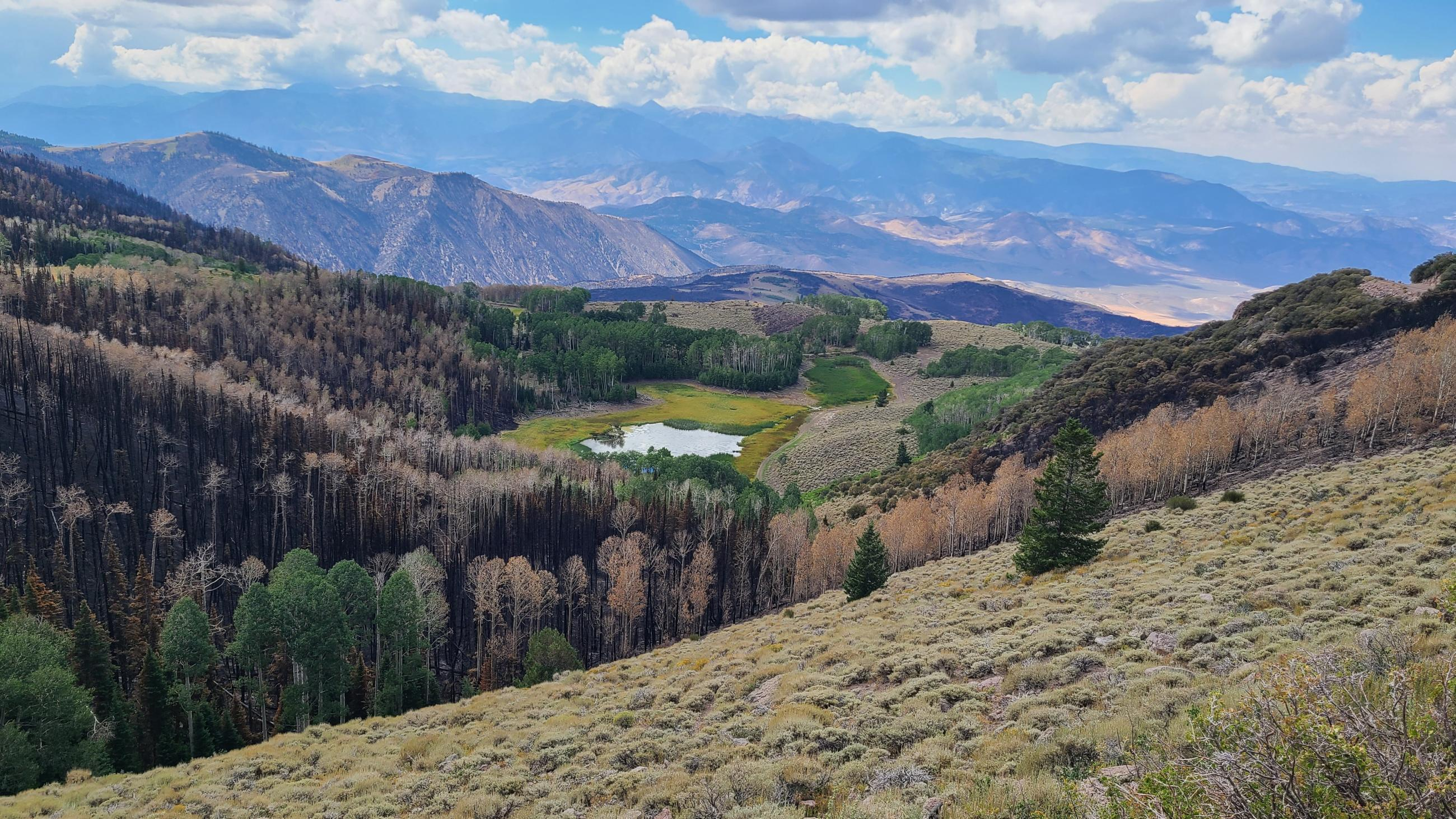
View of Hunts Lake after the Monroe Canyon Fire, seen from Monroe Canyon Road

=== Damage ===
Ten homes were destroyed by the Monroe Canyon Fire, mostly cabins and second homes. Additionally, four smaller structures burned. Twelve power poles owned by Garkane Energy burned in the fire, causing an "unprecedented" power outage in Wayne County. Crews brought in six generators to pick up the energy load while power poles were destroyed. Overall, thousands of residents were impacted by power outages when Garkane Energy de-energized power lines. Suppression efforts cost a total of $103 million.

=== Closures and evacuations ===
Land belonging to the State of Utah and the Bureau of Land Management were closed, and reopened on August 25. Portions of Fishlake National Forest were closed. Several trails and roads would reopen on September 15, with the exception of Monrovian Park Picnic Area and Second Lefthand Fork off-road trail due to potential flooding. State Route 24 was temporarily closed on July 30 due to poor visibility conditions from smoke.

Evacuations were primarily in and near Monroe Meadows, Cove Mountain, Elk Country Cabins, Long Flat, Big Lake, Porters, Burrville, Bear Valley, and Bagleby Ranch.

=== Environmental impacts ===
The burned-over soil contributes to possible flash flooding and may become not receptive to water. This increases the risk of debris flow and runoff, as well, all a particular concern during heavy rain in late August and early September.

Thousands of animals, including fish, deer, and elk, live in the area the Monroe Canyon Fire burned, with food scarcity and habitat damage will remain possible hazards and challenges for animals in the months following the fire. Food shortages will be the most significant in areas with lower elevation vegetation. During the blaze, most animals were able to outrun the flames, although one group of nine deer were surrounded and killed by the fire. Several streams and lakes are in the fire's burn area, carrying rainbow trout, Bonneville cutthroat trout, and tiger trout. The fish face a potential impact during flooding that carries ash into water sources.

== Growth and containment table ==
Fire containment status Gray: contained; Red: active; %: percent contained;
| Date | Area burned | Personnel | Containment |
|---|---|---|---|
| July 13 | 700 acres (280 ha; 1.1 sq mi) | . . . | |
| July 14 | 3,900 acres (1,600 ha; 6.1 sq mi) | . . . | |
| July 15 | 8,028 acres (3,249 ha; 12.544 sq mi) | . . . | |
| July 16 | 8,646 acres (3,499 ha; 13.509 sq mi) | . . . | |
| July 17 | 8,646 acres (3,499 ha; 13.509 sq mi) | 389 | |
| July 18 | 8,646 acres (3,499 ha; 13.509 sq mi) | 378 | |
| July 19 | 9,451 acres (3,825 ha; 14.767 sq mi) | 586 | |
| July 20 | 9,483 acres (3,838 ha; 14.817 sq mi) | 628 | |
| July 21 | 9,544 acres (3,862 ha; 14.913 sq mi) | 808 | |
| July 22 | 9,705 acres (3,927 ha; 15.164 sq mi) | 878 | |
| July 23 | 10,066 acres (4,074 ha; 15.728 sq mi) | 879 | |
| July 24 | 10,244 acres (4,146 ha; 16.006 sq mi) | 928 | |
| July 25 | 10,244 acres (4,146 ha; 16.006 sq mi) | 939 | |
| July 26 | 10,977 acres (4,442 ha; 17.152 sq mi) | 961 | |
| July 27 | 20,870 acres (8,450 ha; 32.61 sq mi) | 975 | |
| July 28 | 23,265 acres (9,415 ha; 36.352 sq mi) | 999 | |
| July 29 | 31,820 acres (12,880 ha; 49.72 sq mi) | . . . | |
| July 30 | 36,637 acres (14,826 ha; 57.245 sq mi) | 1,052 | |
| July 31 | 45,964 acres (18,601 ha; 71.819 sq mi) | 1,132 | |
| August 1 | 55,642 acres (22,518 ha; 86.941 sq mi) | 1,217 | |
| August 2 | 57,118 acres (23,115 ha; 89.247 sq mi) | 1,503 | |
| August 3 | 58,795 acres (23,793 ha; 91.867 sq mi) | 1,503 | |
| August 4 | 62,719 acres (25,381 ha; 97.998 sq mi) | 1,503 | |
| August 5 | 63,653 acres (25,759 ha; 99.458 sq mi) | 1,348 | |
| August 6 | 64,957 acres (26,287 ha; 101.495 sq mi) | 1,366 | |
| August 7 | 66,275 acres (26,821 ha; 103.555 sq mi) | 1,331 | |
| August 8 | 67,267 acres (27,222 ha; 105.105 sq mi) | 1,362 | |
| August 9 | 70,362 acres (28,474 ha; 109.941 sq mi) | 1,351 | |
| August 10 | 71,966 acres (29,124 ha; 112.447 sq mi) | 1,351 | |
| August 11 | 71,856 acres (29,079 ha; 112.275 sq mi) | 1,333 | |
| August 12 | 71,844 acres (29,074 ha; 112.256 sq mi) | 1,506 | |
| August 13 | 72,195 acres (29,216 ha; 112.805 sq mi) | 1,458 | |
| August 14 | 73,747 acres (29,844 ha; 115.230 sq mi) | 1,251 | |
| August 15 | 73,631 acres (29,797 ha; 115.048 sq mi) | 1,189 | |
| August 16 | 73,655 acres (29,807 ha; 115.086 sq mi) | 1,043 | |
| August 17 | 73,655 acres (29,807 ha; 115.086 sq mi) | 1,009 | |
| August 18 | 73,738 acres (29,841 ha; 115.216 sq mi) | 931 | |
| August 19 | 73,709 acres (29,829 ha; 115.170 sq mi) | 870 | |
| August 20 | 73,698 acres (29,825 ha; 115.153 sq mi) | 719 | |
| August 21 | 73,722 acres (29,834 ha; 115.191 sq mi) | 644 | |
| August 22 | 73,722 acres (29,834 ha; 115.191 sq mi) | 599 | |
| August 23 | 73,722 acres (29,834 ha; 115.191 sq mi) | 541 | |
| August 24 | 73,722 acres (29,834 ha; 115.191 sq mi) | 439 | |
| August 25 | 73,721 acres (29,834 ha; 115.189 sq mi) | 447 | |
–
| September 5 | 73,721 acres (29,834 ha; 115.189 sq mi) | 118 | |

== See also ==
- 2025 United States wildfires
- Dragon Bravo Fire
- Forsyth Fire
- Tank Hollow Fire
