= 2024 Utah wildfires =

Natural disasters in the USA

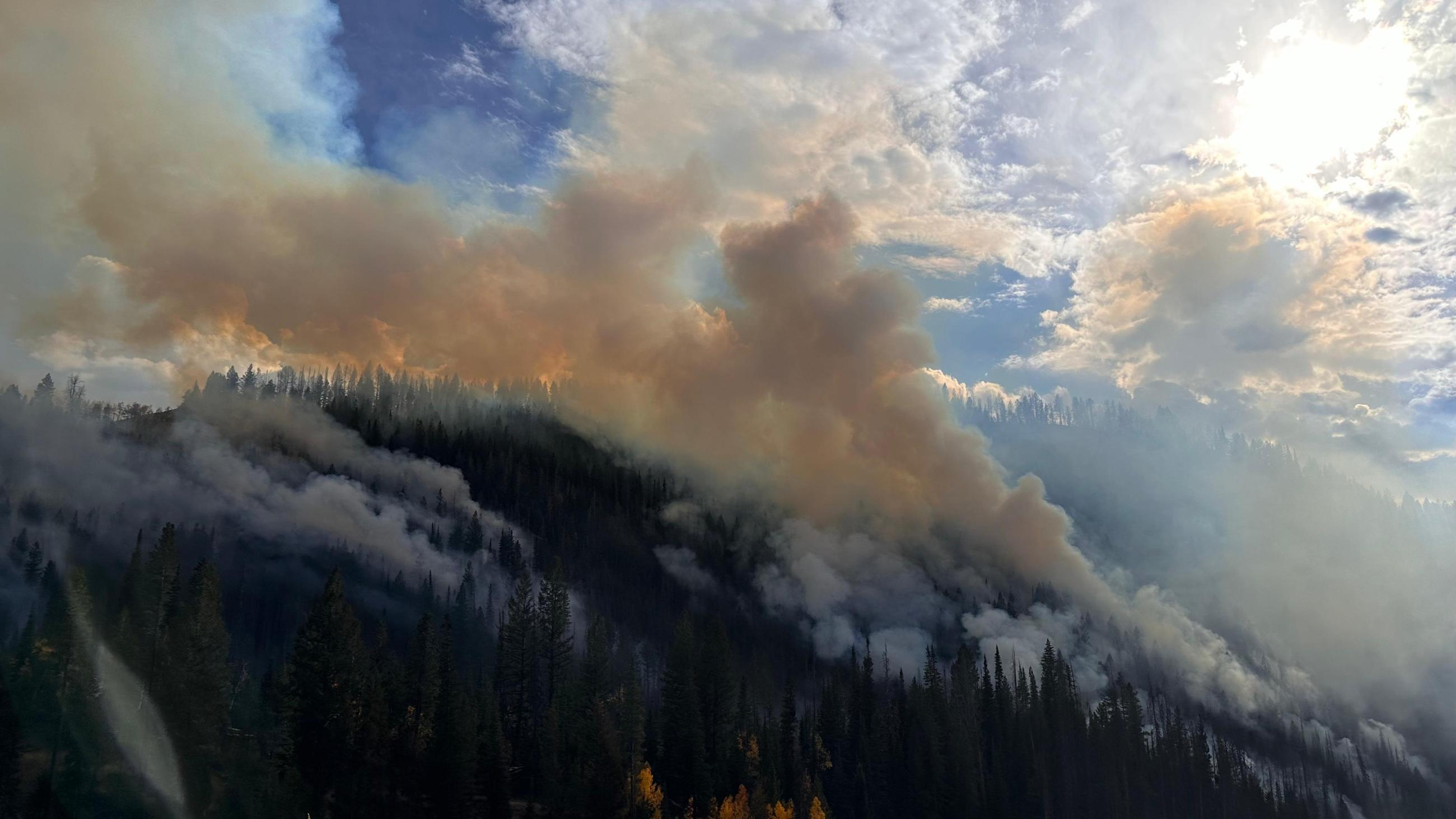
- The Yellow Lake Fire on October 7

Statistics
- Total fires: 1,244
- Total area: 90,660 acres (36,690 ha)

Impacts
- Injuries: 1 firefighter

The 2024 Utah wildfire season was a series of wildfires that burned throughout the U.S. state of Utah during 2024.

== Background ==
While the typical wildfire season in Utah varies, most fires occur in between July and October. Fire conditions can heavily depend on monsoons that last from late June to September. Dry monsoons can allow fires to start and spread easier, while wet ones can cause fire relief. Additionally, hot temperatures and overall dry conditions play a large role.

== Summary ==
While above average snow packs had diminished fire activity in previous years (in the 2022-23 and 2023-24 winters), the melting snow led to growth of plants that were ideal for fire conditions. The hot and dry conditions dried out the abundant vegetation, a prime fuel for fires. There were above normal temperatures throughout Utah, including Salt Lake City seeing its first 100 degrees day three weeks before average. Warmth and dryness continued into August. A late and below-average monsoon contributed to drought and fire conditions. Unusually dry conditions in June and July created critical fire conditions. Thus, several fires were ignited during this period. All these conditions contributed to 538 wildfires burning approximately 40,000 acres (16,000 ha) by mid-July compared to 808 wildfires total in 2023 that burned 18,061 acres (7,309 ha).

The monsoon did not arrive until early August, but still provided a brief break in fire activity. Despite this, hot, dry, and windy weather returned in September and lasted until mid-October, causing an increased number of wildfires. Many large fires continued until the end of October when autumn storms brought precipitation throughout the state, essentially bringing an end to the wildfire season.

== List of wildfires ==
The following is a list of fires that burned more than 1,000 acres (400 ha), or produced significant structural damage or casualties.

Name	County	Acres	Start date	Containment Date (Note: Containment means that fire crews have established and secured control lines around the fire's perimeter. These lines are artificial barriers, like trenches or cleared vegetation, designed to stop the fire's spread, or natural barriers like rivers. Containment reflects progress in managing the fire but does not necessarily mean the fire is starved of fuel, under control, or put out.)	Notes	Ref
Little Twist	Beaver	5,367	May 13	August 22	Firefighter combating the fire seriously injured by falling snag.	
Silver King	Piute	18,222	July 5	August 1	Ignited by lightning roughly 3 miles (4.8 km) away from Marysvale.	
Deer Springs	Kane	11,765.77	July 7	July 30	Burned nearly 9,000 acres (3,600 ha) of pinyon-juniper in first 24 hours.	
Boulter	Tooele	2,243	July 7	August 30	Human-caused. Evacuations issued for Vernon and Eureka.	
Hag	Box Elder	3,610	July 31	August 1		
Dry Fork	Rich	1,340	August 6	August 12	Evacuated ranchers and livestock.	
Prairie	Grand	1,921	September 16	September 18	Ignited by lightning near the southeast Colorado border.	
Yellow Lake	Wasatch	33,041	September 28	November 5	Burned 10 miles (16 km) south of Francis and destroyed eight log decks. Caused by improper use of logging equipment.	

Perimeters of 2024 Utah wildfires (map data)
