= Forsyth Fire =

2025 wildfire in Utah, USA

- Part of the 2025 Utah wildfires
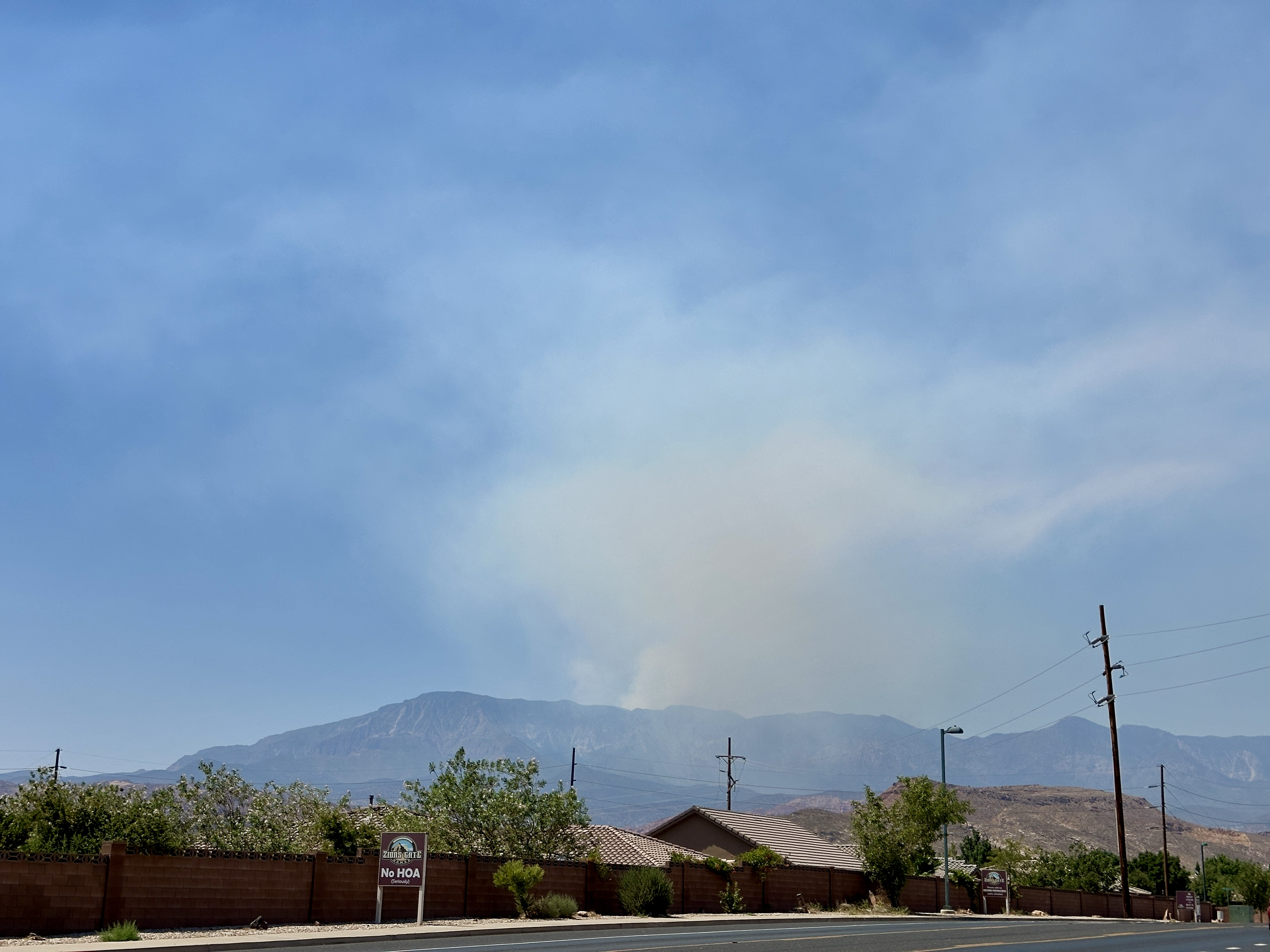
- Smoke from the fire on July 10, seen from Hurricane
- Date: June 9 -; August 7, 2025
- Location: 30 miles (48 km) north of St. George, Washington County, Utah

Statistics
- Perimeter: 100% contained
- Burned area: 15,675 acres (6,343 ha; 63.43 km^{2})

Impacts
- Deaths: 0
- Injuries: 1 firefighter
- Evacuated: 400 - 500
- Structures destroyed: 14 residential, 4 outbuildings
- Cost: $35-37.9 million (2025 USD) (Note: The official damage estimate from the National Oceanic and Atmospheric Administration’s finalized report for the wildfire is $35 million. The Daily Commercial citing NOAA as the source, reports the estimated damage for the wildfire is $37.9 million.)

Ignition
- Cause: Lightning strike

The Forsyth Fire was a wildfire that burned 30 miles (48 km) north of St. George, Utah. The fire was ignited on June 9, 2025, from a lightning strike starting a fire inside a tree trunk. Strong winds on June 19 resulted in the fire to rapidly spread towards Pine Valley. The fire has destroyed 14 residential structures and four outbuildings. The fire reached 100% containment on August 7 at a size of 15,675 acres (6,343 ha).

== Background ==
The Forsyth Fire spread outside of tree as a smoldering flame from strong winds caused the fire to pick up. There were very hot temperatures and strong winds that aided the fire's rapid spread. Additionally, there were single-digit humidity levels, all these contributing to red flag warnings and fire weather watches. Steep terrain drove the fire, along with making it difficult for fire crews to access the area.

== Cause ==
The tree lightning initially struck on June 9 that ignited the Forsyth Fire

Initially, the Forsyth Fire was believed to have started on June 19, 2025 from a lightning strike. However, after further investigation, it was determined a lightning strike on June 9 struck the base of a tree and smoldered for several days. The fire picked up on June 19 when strong winds during a red flag warning caused the fire to pick up.

== Progression ==
=== June ===
The Forsyth Fire was caused from a lightning strike hitting a tree on June 9, leaving a fire a smolder inside the tree's trunk. On June 19, strong winds during a red flag warning caused the fire to pick up, and smoke was now visible with fire crews responding. That evening, the fire spread to an estimated 50–100 acres (20–40 ha) in dry brush, and grew to 1,000 acres (400 ha) early the next day. Evacuation orders had been issued in Pine Valley. Strong winds played a large role in the fire's spread, already at 1,640 acres (660 ha) that evening. The Forsyth Fire was experiencing "extreme" fire behavior with 150 firefighters combating it. Several homes had been destroyed.

On June 24, fire's size had reached 7,045 acres (2,851 ha) and still 0% contained, with almost 300 personnel fighting the fire. They prioritized on establishing containment and protecting structures near Pine Valley Reservoir, and completing a burnout operation near Pine Valley Recreation Area. Evacuation orders remained in place for Pine Valley and Grass Valley, with an evacuation warning for Pinto. At a community meeting, a United States Forest Service fire behavior analyst stated there were "some of the highest fire danger levels recorded in the past 25 years".

More firing operations occurred on June 25 to remove vegetation around structures. Firefighters were laying a hose line around Pine Valley, and other crews focused on evacuating residents in Pine Valley and Grass Valley. The fire had grown by 670 acres (270 ha). However, "Go Now" evacuation orders were lowered to "Set" levels. The Forsyth Fire, now at 10,673 acres (4,319 ha), was 8% contained. Despite this, hot and dry conditions were expected, including wind gusts from 20–25 miles per hour (32–40 km/h). Cooler, wetter conditions were forecasted.

Containment lines were established south and west of Pine Valley on June 28, and the fire was 22% contained. The eastern part of the fire was still burning, and steep slopes remained a concern. Suppression efforts were aided by air support crews. The Forsyth Fire was over 12,000 acres (4,900 ha), but was 26% contained. Hot spots on the north part of the fire were quickly extinguished, and temperatures were upwards of 80 °F.

=== July onwards ===
A red flag warning was in effect on July 1, with winds up to 25 miles per hour (40 km/h) and a weather system with potential for lightning and outflow winds, with a low chance of rain. A community meeting was scheduled for New Harmony due to an increasing threat from the fire. Fire crews focused on addressing hot spots. However, containment increased to 42% and the fire was 13,419 acres (5,430 ha). There was still a high chance of dry lightning and gusty winds, as well as a 25% chance of rain and possible microbursts.

July 4 was considered "a critical fire day" because of a warming trend, low moisture, strong winds up to 35 miles per hour (56 km/h), and dry vegetation. Despite this, Level 2 "Set" evacuations were lowered to Level 1 "Ready" status. The critical fire weather continued into the next day, but a scouting operation revealed there would be no more spread from the southwest part of the fire. The Forsyth Fire was 47% contained.

Warm temperatures, low fuel moistures, winds from 15–20 miles per hour (24–32 km/h), and low humidity levels contributed to fire conditions. Smoke would be visible in St. George, and crews worked on repairing dozer lines. By July 8, the fire had grown to 14,241 acres (5,763 ha) and was 51% contained. Temperatures reached up to 90 °F with the humidity below 15%. The latter was the main reason for moderate fire activity.

Steep terrain drove the fire another 775 acres (314 ha), and it was now seen from Pine Mountain overlooking Southern Utah on July 11. Residents believed the fire would come over the mountain. The Forsyth Fire was 58% contained at 15,363 acres (6,217 ha), mostly spreading along the southern edge. The following day, hot and dry conditions drove the fire which had now reached 67% containment. The fire's size grew to 15,604 acres (6,315 ha) and reached 72% containment on June 13. Aerial drops were aimed at the southern edge. High temperatures and humidity in the single digits triggered a fire weather watch for July 15.

On June 16, a drone was detected in the area, grounding all aircraft operations. Heavy monsoonal rains on July 18 brought cooler temperatures and high humidity, and moisture will last until July 19. There was chance of thunderstorms, and the storm system brought gusty winds. Only the fire's southern edge remained uncontained.

Moist and monsoonal conditions persisted, and containment increased to 99% on July 23 with no perimeter growth. Level 1 Ready evacuations for Pine Valley, Grass Valley, and Gray's Ranch were lifted.

The Forsyth Fire reached 100% containment on August 7 at a size of 15,675 acres (6,343 ha).

== Effects ==
=== Damage ===
The Forsyth Fire destroyed eighteen structures total: fourteen residences and four outbuildings in Pine Valley, Utah. About 400 other structures were threatened. On June 21, Rocky Mountain Energy enacted a Public Safety Power Shutoff in Southern and Central Utah. As of July 15, 2025, the fire has caused an estimated $35.7 million (2025 USD) in damage.

One firefighter was injured while combating the fire on July 16. He fell off a hill and was airlifted to St. George Regional Hospital. He is expected to make a "full recovery".

=== Closures and evacuations ===
Mandatory evacuation orders were issued for Pine Valley, Grass Valley, and Gray's Ranch. Evacuation warnings were issued for Pinto. Between 400 and 500 residents were evacuated.

Pine Valley Recreation Area will be closed for the rest of 2025 due to damage from the Forsyth Fire. Reservations were cancelled and refunded. Several forest roads were closed by the United States Forest Service.

=== Environmental impacts ===
When evacuation orders were lifted, residents were warned of burnt trees falling, ash pits, dust devils, and rockslides attributed to the fire.

There were smoke health concerns for residents; an inversion set over Pine Valley at night. This trapped smoke in, allowing air quality levels to reach hazardous.

Average air quality from June 30 - July 6
City	June 30	July 1	July 2	July 3	July 4	July 5	July 6
Pine Valley	Very Unhealthy	Very Unhealthy	Unhealthy	Moderate	Moderate	Moderate	Moderate
St. George	Moderate	Good	Good	Good	Good	Good	Good
Hurricane	Good	Good	Good	Good	Good	Good	Good
Zion National Park	Moderate	Good	Good	Good	Good	Good	Good
Cedar City	Moderate	Moderate	Good	Good	Good	Moderate	Good

Postfire assessements of Soil Burn Severity showed a notable reduction in burn severity in the Middle Fork of the Santa Clara River, where passage of the fire front was moderated by night-time drone operations. The adjacent North and South Forks of the Santa Clara burned during the daytime, and experienced higher burn severity. October rains caused debris flows over portions of the severely burned areas.

== Growth and containment table ==
Fire containment status Gray: contained; Red: active; %: percent contained;
Date	Area burned	Personnel	Containment
June 21	1,500 acres (610 ha; 6.1 km^{2})	Unknown	
June 22	1,640 acres (660 ha; 6.6 km^{2})	400	
June 23	7,045 acres (2,851 ha; 28.51 km^{2})	280	
June 24	8,229 acres (3,330 ha; 33.30 km^{2})	509	
June 25	8,899 acres (3,601 ha; 36.01 km^{2})	696	
June 26	9,665 acres (3,911 ha; 39.11 km^{2})	734	
June 28	11,642 acres (4,711 ha; 47.11 km^{2})	687	
June 29	12,188 acres (4,932 ha; 49.32 km^{2})	672	
June 30	12,851 acres (5,201 ha; 52.01 km^{2})	655	
July 1	13,272 acres (5,371 ha; 53.71 km^{2})	660	
July 2	13,566 acres (5,490 ha; 54.90 km^{2})	671	
July 3	13,566 acres (5,490 ha; 54.90 km^{2})	671	
July 4	13,597 acres (5,503 ha; 55.03 km^{2})	664	
July 5	13,689 acres (5,540 ha; 55.40 km^{2})	685	
July 6	13,689 acres (5,540 ha; 55.40 km^{2})	643	
July 7	13,941 acres (5,642 ha; 56.42 km^{2})	574	
July 8	14,241 acres (5,763 ha; 57.63 km^{2})	616	
July 9	14,338 acres (5,802 ha; 58.02 km^{2})	514	
July 10	14,558 acres (5,891 ha; 58.91 km^{2})	548	
July 11	15,363 acres (6,217 ha; 62.17 km^{2})	589	
July 12	15,363 acres (6,217 ha; 62.17 km^{2})	589	
July 13	15,640 acres (6,330 ha; 63.3 km^{2})	580	
July 14	15,673 acres (6,343 ha; 63.43 km^{2})	563	
July 15	15,676 acres (6,344 ha; 63.44 km^{2})	561	
July 16	15,682 acres (6,346 ha; 63.46 km^{2})	509	
July 17	15,677 acres (6,344 ha; 63.44 km^{2})	447	
July 18	15,662 acres (6,338 ha; 63.38 km^{2})	311	
July 19	15,662 acres (6,338 ha; 63.38 km^{2})	275	
July 20	15,662 acres (6,338 ha; 63.38 km^{2})	265	
July 21	15,662 acres (6,338 ha; 63.38 km^{2})	221	
July 22	15,662 acres (6,338 ha; 63.38 km^{2})	232	
July 23	15,662 acres (6,338 ha; 63.38 km^{2})	232	
–
August 7	15,675 acres (6,343 ha; 63.43 km^{2})	Unknown	

== See also ==
- 2020 Utah wildfires
- 2024 Utah wildfires
- 2025 United States wildfires
- Dragon Bravo Fire
- White Sage Fire
- Air quality in Utah
