= 2025 Colorado wildfires =

Natural disasters in the USA

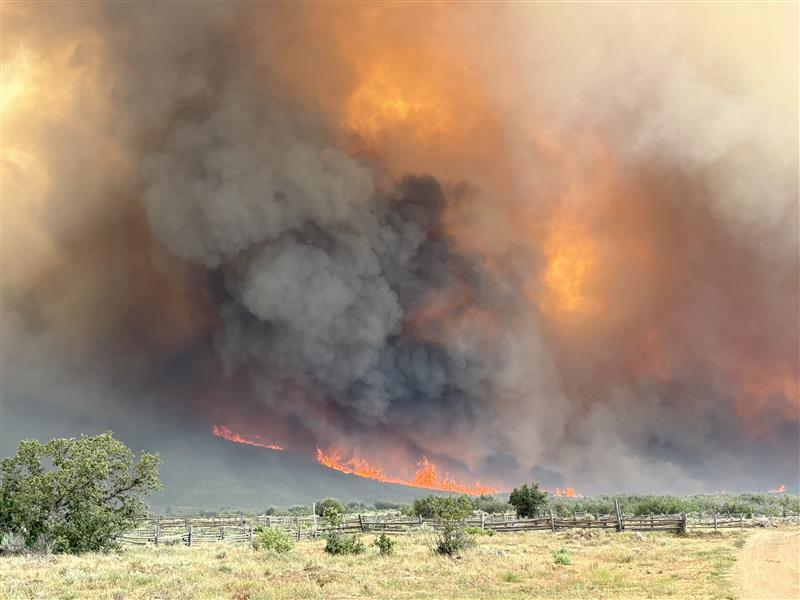
- The Turner Gulch Fire on July 15, 2025.

The 2025 Colorado wildfires were a series of wildfires that burned in the U.S. state of Colorado.

== Background ==
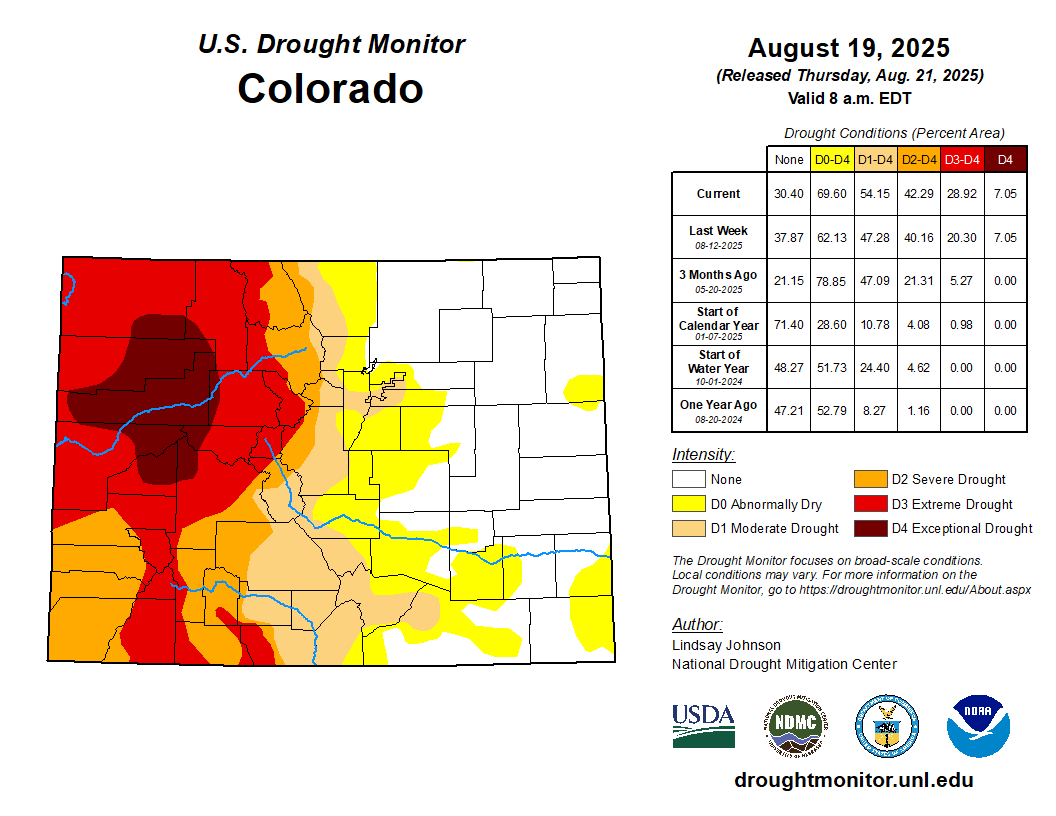
Colorado Drought Monitor on August 19, 2025

While "fire season" varies every year in Colorado, most wildfires occur in between May and September. However, there is an increasing fire danger in winter months. Fire conditions can be exacerbated by drought, strong winds, and vegetation growth. Climate change is leading to increased temperatures, lower humidity levels, and drought conditions are happening more often. Additionally, warmer temperatures and less precipitation can result in less snowmelt, further contributing to bad wildfire conditions.

== Summary ==
At the start of the 2025 fire season, Colorado officials forecasted a mixed to above-normal fire risk, with expectation of around 6,000 wildfires burning approximately 160,000 acres in an average year.

By mid-summer, extreme drought and heat across western Colorado had fueled rapid fire growth. The Lee Fire, ignited by lightning on August 2 near Meeker, surged to over 100,000 acres within a week, becoming one of the largest in state history. In parallel, the Elk Fire, also in the Meeker area, burned over 14,000 acres before reaching full containment.

Other significant fires included the South Rim Fire in Black Canyon of the Gunnison National Forest, started July 10 by lightning, which burned 4,232 acres and destroyed several visitor structures before reaching full containment on September 18.

Across the Western Slope, multiple lightning-caused blazes consumed tens of thousands of additional acres, straining suppression resources.

Smoke from the fires has degraded air quality across much of the state, prompting health advisories and complicating firefighting efforts.

== List of wildfires ==
The following is a list of fires that burned more than 1,000 acres (400 ha), produced significant structural damage, or resulted in casualties.

Name	County	Acres	Start date	Containment date (Note: Containment means that fire crews have established and secured control lines around the fire's perimeter. These lines are artificial barriers, like trenches or cleared vegetation, designed to stop the fire's spread, or natural barriers like rivers. Containment reflects progress in managing the fire but does not necessarily mean the fire is starved of fuel, under control, or put out.)	Notes	Ref.
Andrix	Baca	1,934	March 10	March 10	Cost $35,000 in suppression efforts. Burned 20 miles (32 km) east of Kim.	
Meridian	El Paso	2,540	March 13	March 16	Destroyed one structure and prompted evacuations east of Colorado Springs.	
Iron Ladies	Weld	1,500	March 17	March 18	6 miles (9.7 km) west of Grover in Pawnee National Grassland.	
31 North & South	Otero	3,400	March 18	March 18		
US 160	Las Animas	2,270	April 7	April 7		
South Rim	Montrose	4,232	July 10	September 11	Lightning-caused. Burning in the Black Canyon of the Gunnison National Park.	
Sowbelly	Delta, Mesa, Montrose	2274	July 10	August 1	Lightning-caused. Burned in the Dominguez-Escalante National Conservation Area.	
Turner Gulch	Mesa	31,695	July 10	September 2	Lightning-caused. Burned near Gateway.	
Stoner Mesa	Montezuma, Dolores	10,249	July 28	December 3	Lightning-caused.	
Lee	Rio Blanco	137,758	August 2	September 18	Lightning-caused. Started 18 miles southwest of Meeker.	
Elk	Rio Blanco	14,518	August 2	August 16	Lightning-caused. Started 10 miles east of Meeker.	
Twelve	Moffat	4,287	August 6	August 22	Human-caused. Burned 3 miles (4.8 km) northeast of Elk Springs.	
Crosho	Rio Blanco, Routt	2,073	August 11	August 25	Undetermined cause.	
Derby	Eagle	5,453	August 17	December 11	Lightning-caused. Burned 10 miles (16 km) north of Dotsero. Destroyed one structure.	
Large Impact	El Paso	5,500	November 6		Human-caused. Burned near Fort Carson.	
County Road L	Yuma	2,000	December 17	December 18	Caused power outages along with the County Road 33 Fire.	
County Road 33	Yuma	14,050	December 17	December 19	Burned south of Eckley. Caused power outages along with the County Road L Fire.	

Perimeters of 2025 Colorado wildfires (map data)

== See also ==
- 2025 United States wildfires
