= Lee Fire =

2025 wildfire in Colorado

- Part of the 2025 Colorado wildfires
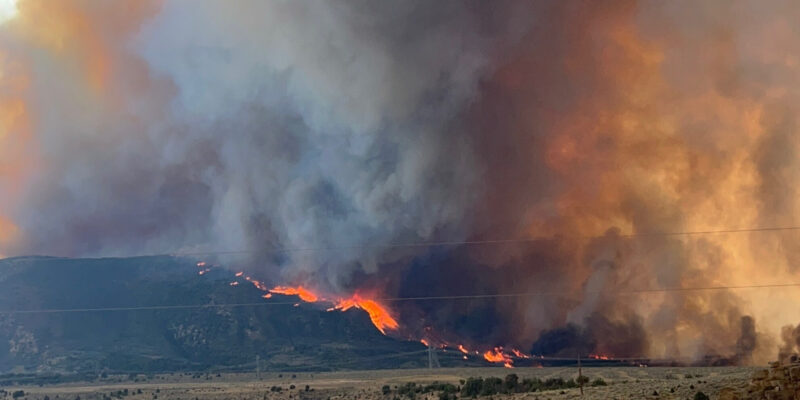
- Lee Fire in August of 2025
- Date: August 2, 2025 – September 16, 2025 (45 days)
- Location: Meeker, Colorado
- Coordinates: 39°57′52″N 108°09′05″W

Statistics
- Perimeter: 100% contained
- Burned area: 137,758 acres (55,749 ha)

Impacts
- Structures destroyed: 2

Ignition
- Cause: Lightning

Map
- Perimeter of the Lee Fire (map data)
- Location in northwest Colorado

The Lee Fire was a large wildfire near Meeker, Colorado. The fire began on August 2, 2025, reaching containment on September 16 2025.

At a size of 137,758 acres (55,749 ha; 215 sq mi) It is the fifth largest wildfire in Colorado history and the third largest wildfire in the United States during the 2025 wildfire season.

== Fire history ==
=== August ===
The Lee Fire was first reported on August 2, 2025, at around 4:59 pm MST.

On August 5, 2025, Colorado Governor Jared Polis issued a state of emergency for four wildfires burning in western Colorado, including the Lee Fire, which had merged overnight with a second lightning-caused fire to grow to 14,000 acres (5,700 ha). On August 7, the Governor mobilized the National Guard as part of "mobilizing every available resource to protect lives and property." The fire had grown to 45,000 acres (18,000 ha), becoming the then-largest wildfire in Colorado. It remained at 0% contained as strong winds advanced the fire on several fronts, after making large runs on August 6, sometimes advancing about 1 mph (1.6 km/h). On the same day, "a large smoke cloud collapsed causing the fire to jump Colorado 13 and rapidly consume 100 acres before firefighting aircraft could get ahead of it."

On 6–7 August, firefighters focused on slowing the advance to the north, and positioning to protect houses and structures, as the fire was threatening the town of Meeker. By the 9th, more focus had been added to the south side of the fire to try to protect structures in that area as the fire had rapidly expanded southward.

The active fire perimeter was 61,600 acres (24,900 ha) on August 8, growing to 88,800 acres (35,900 ha) by August 9, still with 0% contained.

By Sunday August 10, one week after the fire started, the fire perimeter had expanded to 106,700 acres (43,200 ha) with the interagency fire service stating that six percent containment had been achieved. Fire area growth had slowed by August 11, with 113,000 acres, 7000 acres more than the day before, but less expansion than any of the five previous days. "The containment line for the Lee fire is on the northeastern corner of the fire, closest to Meeker," and is now 7% contained.

=== September ===
On September 16, 100% containment was achieved on the Lee Fire.

=== Cause ===
The cause of the fire is believed to be due to lightning.

== Impact ==
=== Closures and evacuations ===
The city of Meeker, Colorado was placed on pre-evacuation notice on August 7, and Colorado State Highway 13 was closed for 50+ miles south of Meeker, closing one of only three routes out of town.

== See also ==
- Elk Fire - Another wildfire that also burned near Meeker, Colorado
- 2025 United States wildfires
- 2025 Colorado wildfires
- List of Colorado wildfires
