= La Sal, Utah =

- CDP
- Location in San Juan County and the state of Utah.
- Coordinates: 38°18′00″N 109°15′40″W
- Country: United States
- State: Utah
- County: San Juan
- Founded: 1930
- Named for: La Sal Mountains

Area
  - Total: 46.0 sq mi (119.2 km^{2})
  - Land: 45.8 sq mi (118.7 km^{2})
  - Water: 0.15 sq mi (0.4 km^{2})
- Elevation: 6,808 ft (2,075 m)

Population (2020)
  - Total: 348
  - Density: 7.59/sq mi (2.93/km^{2})
- Time zone: UTC-7 (Mountain (MST))
  - Summer (DST): UTC-6 (MDT)
- ZIP code: 84530
- Area code: 435
- FIPS code: 49-43110
- GNIS feature ID: 2408517

La Sal is a census-designated place (CDP) in northeastern San Juan County, Utah, United States. The population was 348 at the 2020 census. The name comes from the La Sal Mountains which means in Spanish "The Salt". The area is known for its uranium resources.

== Geography ==
According to the United States Census Bureau, the CDP has a total area of 46.0 square miles (119.1 km^{2}), of which 45.8 square miles (118.7 km^{2}) is land and 0.2 square mile (0.4 km^{2}) (0.35%) is water.

=== Climate ===
According to the Köppen Climate Classification system, La Sal has a borderline continental climate and semi-arid climate (Dfb/BSk).

Climate data for La Sal, Utah, 1991–2020 normals, extremes 1978–present
Month	Jan	Feb	Mar	Apr	May	Jun	Jul	Aug	Sep	Oct	Nov	Dec	Year
Record high °F (°C)	58 (14)	64 (18)	74 (23)	82 (28)	92 (33)	98 (37)	101 (38)	99 (37)	94 (34)	85 (29)	70 (21)	60 (16)	101 (38)
Mean maximum °F (°C)	47.8 (8.8)	53.1 (11.7)	65.0 (18.3)	73.0 (22.8)	81.8 (27.7)	91.4 (33.0)	94.6 (34.8)	90.7 (32.6)	86.5 (30.3)	77.1 (25.1)	63.4 (17.4)	50.2 (10.1)	95.2 (35.1)
Mean daily maximum °F (°C)	37.3 (2.9)	40.9 (4.9)	50.8 (10.4)	58.8 (14.9)	69.0 (20.6)	81.1 (27.3)	86.3 (30.2)	83.9 (28.8)	75.2 (24.0)	61.9 (16.6)	48.1 (8.9)	36.9 (2.7)	60.9 (16.1)
Daily mean °F (°C)	27.1 (−2.7)	30.8 (−0.7)	39.2 (4.0)	45.7 (7.6)	54.6 (12.6)	65.3 (18.5)	71.5 (21.9)	69.7 (20.9)	61.4 (16.3)	49.0 (9.4)	36.8 (2.7)	26.7 (−2.9)	48.2 (9.0)
Mean daily minimum °F (°C)	16.9 (−8.4)	20.7 (−6.3)	27.6 (−2.4)	32.5 (0.3)	40.3 (4.6)	49.5 (9.7)	56.8 (13.8)	55.5 (13.1)	47.7 (8.7)	36.1 (2.3)	25.5 (−3.6)	16.5 (−8.6)	35.5 (1.9)
Mean minimum °F (°C)	−1.4 (−18.6)	2.7 (−16.3)	11.1 (−11.6)	17.3 (−8.2)	26.2 (−3.2)	36.0 (2.2)	47.3 (8.5)	47.0 (8.3)	33.6 (0.9)	18.9 (−7.3)	7.3 (−13.7)	−0.4 (−18.0)	−4.9 (−20.5)
Record low °F (°C)	−16 (−27)	−25 (−32)	−3 (−19)	6 (−14)	16 (−9)	28 (−2)	36 (2)	33 (1)	18 (−8)	−1 (−18)	−8 (−22)	−22 (−30)	−25 (−32)
Average precipitation inches (mm)	1.04 (26)	0.81 (21)	0.94 (24)	1.11 (28)	0.99 (25)	0.66 (17)	1.31 (33)	1.20 (30)	1.45 (37)	1.36 (35)	0.93 (24)	0.89 (23)	12.69 (322)
Average snowfall inches (cm)	10.4 (26)	8.6 (22)	7.3 (19)	3.8 (9.7)	0.6 (1.5)	0.0 (0.0)	0.0 (0.0)	0.0 (0.0)	0.1 (0.25)	1.8 (4.6)	5.3 (13)	12.3 (31)	50.2 (128)
Average precipitation days (≥ 0.01 in)	5.6	6.1	5.8	5.4	5.0	2.8	6.7	7.1	6.4	5.3	4.4	5.1	65.7
Average snowy days (≥ 0.1 in)	4.1	3.9	3.0	1.8	0.4	0.0	0.0	0.0	0.0	0.7	2.3	4.3	20.5
Source: NOAA

== Demographics ==
As of the census of 2000, there were 339 people, 96 households, and 72 families residing in the CDP. The population density was 7.4 people per square mile (2.9/km^{2}). There were 121 housing units at an average density of 2.6/sq mi (1.0/km^{2}). The racial makeup of the CDP was 66.67% [Caucasian] (U.S. Census), 22.12% Native American, 0.29% Asian, 4.42% from other races, and 6.49% from two or more races. Hispanic or Latino of any race were 11.21% of the population.

There were 96 households, out of which 35.4% had children under the age of 18 living with them, 61.5% were married couples living together, 10.4% had a female householder with no husband present, and 25.0% were non-families. 20.8% of all households were made up of individuals, and 3.1% had someone living alone who was 65 years of age or older. The average household size was 2.73 and the average family size was 3.19.

In the CDP, the population was spread out, with 24.2% under the age of 18, 28.6% from 18 to 24, 20.4% from 25 to 44, 20.4% from 45 to 64, and 6.5% who were 65 years of age or older. The median age was 23 years. For every 100 females, there were 87.3 males. For every 100 females age 18 and over, there were 91.8 males.

The median income for a household in the CDP was $25,926, and the median income for a family was $26,071. Males had a median income of $26,295 versus $25,893 for females. The per capita income for the CDP was $7,567. About 16.3% of families and 22.1% of the population were below the poverty line, including 27.9% of those under age 18 and 100.0% of those age 65 or over.

== See also ==
- List of census-designated places in Utah
