= Elk Fire =

2025 wildfire in Colorado

- Part of the 2025 Colorado wildfires
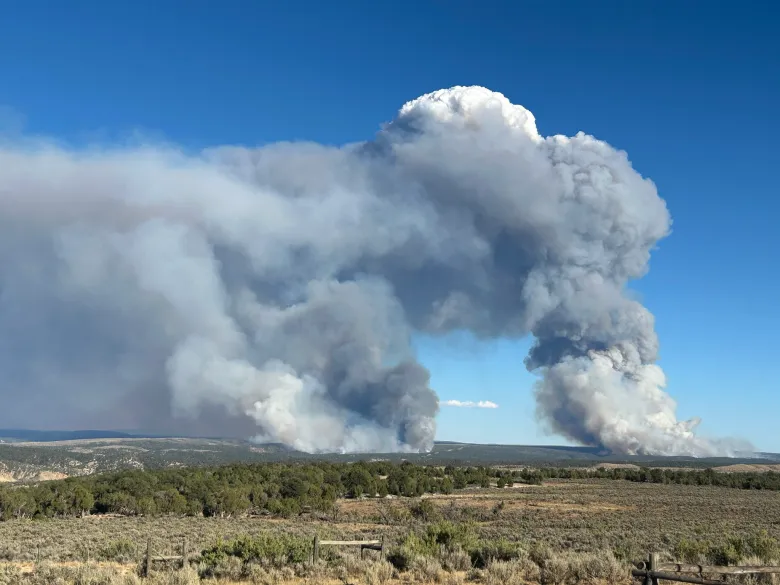
- Smoke from the Elk Fire, Lee Fire and Grease Fire as seen on August 3, 2025
- Date: August 2, 2025 – August 19, 2025
- Location: Meeker, Colorado & Buford, Colorado
- Coordinates: 39°59′09″N 107°41′37″W

Statistics
- Burned area: 14,518 acres (5,875 ha)

Impacts
- Structures destroyed: 3

Ignition
- Cause: Lightning

Map
- Perimeter of the Elk Fire (map data)
- Location in northwest Colorado

The Elk Fire was a wildfire burning near the town of Meeker, Colorado and the community of Buford, Colorado that began on August 2, 2025. 14,549 acres (5,888 ha) and is 100% contained.

The fire has destroyed at least 2 homes.

== Events ==
=== August ===
The Elk Fire was first reported on August 2, 2025, at around 12:30 pm MST.

On August 5, 2025, Colorado Governor Jared Polis issued a state of emergency for four wildfires burning in western Colorado, including the Elk Fire.

On August 16, 2025, the fire was reported as fully contained after burning 14,518 acres.

=== Cause ===
The fire started because of a lightning strike, as witnessed by local in miller creek.

== See also ==
- Lee Fire - Another wildfire that also burned near Meeker, Colorado
- 2025 United States wildfires
- 2025 Colorado wildfires
- List of Colorado wildfires
