= List of Micromus species =

This is a list of 86 species in the genus Micromus.

== Micromus species ==
- Micromus acutipennis Kimmins, 1956
- Micromus angularis (Perkins, 1910)
- Micromus angulatus (Stephens, 1836)
- Micromus angustipennis (Perkins in Sharp, 1899)
- Micromus atlanticus Tjeder, 1976
- Micromus audax (Krüger, 1922)
- Micromus australis Hagen, 1858
- Micromus bellulus (Perkins in Sharp, 1899)
- Micromus berzosai Monserrat, 1992
- Micromus bifasciatus Tillyard, 1923
- Micromus borealis Klimaszewski and Kevan, 1988
- Micromus brandti New, 1989
- Micromus brunnescens (Perkins in Sharp, 1899)
- Micromus calidus Hagen, 1859
- Micromus canariensis Esben-Petersen, 1936
- Micromus carpentieri Lestage, 1925
- Micromus cookeorum (Zimmerman, 1946)
- Micromus costulatus Motschulsky, 1863
- Micromus densimaculosus C.-k. Yang et al., 1995
- Micromus dissimilis (Nakahara, 1915)
- Micromus distinctus (Perkins in Sharp, 1899)
- Micromus drepanoides (Perkins in Sharp, 1899)
- Micromus duporti Lestage, 1929
- Micromus falcatus (Zimmerman, 1957)
- Micromus fanfai Monserrat, 1993
- Micromus felinus Navás, 1912
- Micromus forcipatus (Perkins in Sharp, 1899)
- Micromus formosanus (Krüger, 1922)
- Micromus fulvescens (Perkins in Sharp, 1899)
- Micromus fuscatus (Nakahara, 1965)
- Micromus gradatus Navás, 1912
- Micromus gratus Banks, 1937
- Micromus haleakalae (Perkins in Sharp, 1899)
- Micromus igorotus Banks, 1920
- Micromus jacobsoni Esben-Petersen, 1926
- Micromus lanceolatus Navás, 1910
- Micromus lanosus (Zelený, 1962)
- Micromus latipennis (Perkins in Sharp, 1899)
- Micromus linearis Hagen, 1858
- Micromus lobipennis (Perkins in Sharp, 1899)
- Micromus longispinosus (Perkins in Sharp, 1899)
- Micromus lorianus (Navás, 1929)
- Micromus maculipes (Fraser, 1957)
- Micromus marquesanus (Kimmins, 1932)
- Micromus minimus (Perkins in Sharp, 1899)
- Micromus minusculus Monserrat, 1993
- Micromus mirimaculatus C.-k. Yang et al., 1995
- Micromus montanus Hagen, 1886
- Micromus morosus Gerstaecker, 1894
- Micromus myriostictus C.-k. Yang et al. in Huang et al., 1988
- Micromus neocaledonicus (Nakahara, 1960)
- Micromus nigrifrons Banks, 1937
- Micromus numerosus Navás, 1910
- Micromus obliquus (Krüger, 1922)
- Micromus oblongus Kimmins, 1935
- Micromus ombrias (Perkins, 1910)
- Micromus paganus (Linnaeus, 1767)
- Micromus pallidius (C.-k. Yang, 1987)
- Micromus paradoxus (Perkins in Sharp, 1899)
- Micromus parallelus (Navás, 1936)
- Micromus perelegans Tjeder, 1936
- Micromus perezaballosi Monserrat, 1993
- Micromus placidus Banks, 1937
- Micromus plagatus Navás, 1934
- Micromus posticus (Walker, 1853)
- Micromus pumilus C.-k. Yang, 1987
- Micromus ramosus Navás, 1934
- Micromus remiformis Oswald, 1987
- Micromus rubrinervis (Perkins in Sharp, 1899)
- Micromus sjostedti van der Weele, 1910
- Micromus striolatus C.-k. Yang, 1997
- Micromus subanticus (Walker, 1853)
- Micromus subochraceus (Perkins in Sharp, 1899)
- Micromus sumatranus (Krüger, 1922)
- Micromus swezeyi (Zimmerman, 1940)
- Micromus tasmaniae (Walker, 1860)
- Micromus tianmuanus (C.-k. Yang & Z.-q. Liu, 2001)
- Micromus timidus Hagen, 1853
- Micromus umbrosus Navás, 1931
- Micromus usingeri (Zimmerman, 1940)
- Micromus vagus (Perkins in Sharp, 1899)
- Micromus variegatus (Fabricius, 1793)
- Micromus variolosus Hagen, 1886
- Micromus vulcanius Monserrat, 1993
- Micromus yunnanus (Navás, 1923)
- Micromus zhaoi C.-k. Yang, 1987
