= Cretomerobius =

Cretomerobius Temporal range: Aptian

Scientific classification
- Domain: Eukaryota
- Kingdom: Animalia
- Phylum: Arthropoda
- Class: Insecta
- Order: Neuroptera
- Family: Hemerobiidae
- Subfamily: incertae sedis
- Genus: †Cretomerobius; Ponomarenko, 1992

Species
- C. disjunctus

Extinct genus of insects

Cretomerobius is an extinct genus of lacewings in the neuropteran family Hemerobiidae known from fossils found in Asia. The genus currently contains a single species, the Aptian C. disjunctus.

== History and classification ==
Cretomerobius disjunctus is known from the holotype specimen found in the Aptian age Bon–Tsagan site, one of the richest insect fossil locations in Mongolia. Bon Tsagan preserves lacustrian sediments of a mountain lake. The genus and type species were first described by Alexandr G. Ponomarenko in a 1992 paper on the fossil Neuroptera faunas of Mongolia, who named the species C. "distinctus", and which was later amended to C. disjunctus as a lapsus calami.

The second species originally assigned to the genus, C. wehri, was described from a single mostly complete forewing which was preserved as a compression-impression fossil preserved in shale. The fossil was recovered from outcrops of the Ypresian Klondike Mountain Formation in the Republic, Washington area by Wesley Wehr in 1993. The type specimen is currently preserved in the Department of Paleobiology collections housed at Burke Museum of Natural History and Culture, located in Seattle, Washington, USA. W. wehri was first studied by Vladimir Makarkin of the Far Eastern Branch of the Russian Academy of Sciences, S. Bruce Archibald from Simon Fraser University and John D Oswald of Texas A&M University. Their 2003 type description of the new species was published in the journal The Canadian Entomologist. Makarkin et al coined the specific epithet wehri in honor of Wesley Wehr for his work on the paleontology of the Republic site. Subsequently, Makarkin, Wedmann & Weiterschan (2016) transferred C. wehri to the genus Proneuronema.

At the time of the species description, placement of Cretomerobius within Hemerobiidae was uncertain. The overall venation of the wings did exclude the genus from a majority of the currently defined subfamilies; specifically Adelphohemerobiinae, Berothimerobiinae, Carobiinae, Notiobiellinae, Sympherobiinae, Psychobiellinae, Hemerobiinae, and Microminae. Makarkin et al suggested the possibility that Cretomerobius is an early offshoot genus. It would be near the start of the subfamily group consisting of Drepanacrinae, Megalominae, and Drepanepteryginae; but until more specimens are found and described, the placement could not be resolved.

== Description ==
In general, wings of Cretomerobius show a distinct forking group of the Radial vein into three branches: ORB1, ORB2, and ORB3. The ORB1 vein has a number of pectinate branches which split from the ORB1 vein and angle to the apical area of the wing. Additionally the cubital-proximal, or CuP vein, forms a deep fork and the median vein forks proximally. The forewing of C. wehri is missing portions of the apical margin and small sections from along the fore and hind margins. The wing is estimated to have been 9 mm (0.35 in) by 4.0 mm (0.16 in) at its widest. The two species are distinguished by two characters. Notably, the geographic and temporal distance between the two fossils suggests they are separate species. Additionally to the temporal disjunction, the wings differ in the fusing of the Radial and Subcostal veins. The two veins in C. disjunctus fuse near the apex of the wing forming a single vein before the wing edge. However, in C. wehri, the two veins do not fuse and stay separate the whole length of the wing.
