= Sympherobius killingtoni =

Scientific classification
- Domain: Eukaryota
- Kingdom: Animalia
- Phylum: Arthropoda
- Class: Insecta
- Order: Neuroptera
- Family: Hemerobiidae
- Genus: Sympherobius
- Species: S. killingtoni

Binomial name
- Sympherobius killingtoni Carpenter, 1940

Species of lacewing

Sympherobius killingtoni is a species of brown lacewing in the family Hemerobiidae. It is found in Central America and North America.
