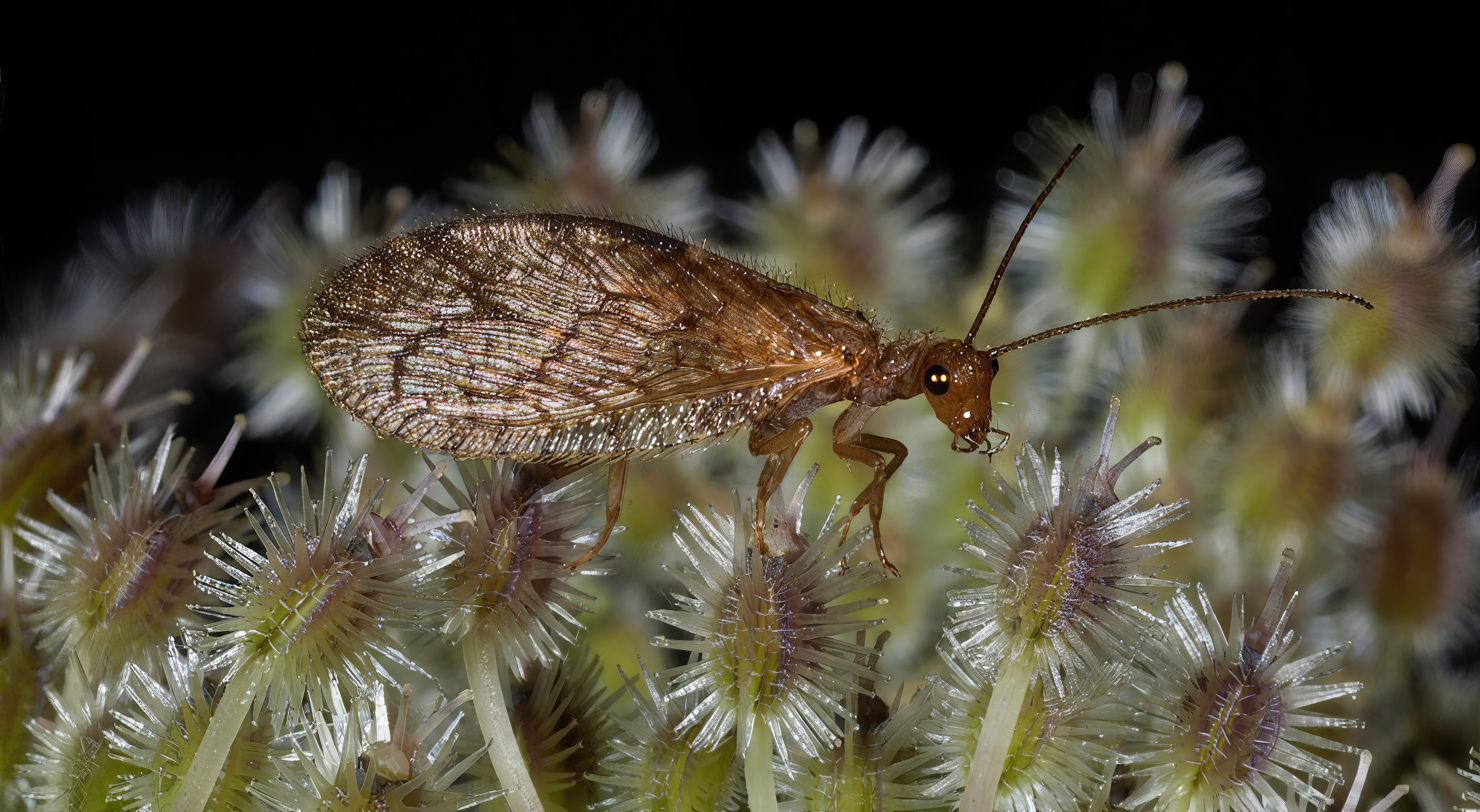

Scientific classification
- Domain: Eukaryota
- Kingdom: Animalia
- Phylum: Arthropoda
- Class: Insecta
- Order: Neuroptera
- Family: Hemerobiidae
- Genus: Micromus
- Species: M. angulatus

Binomial name
- Micromus angulatus (Stephens, 1836)

= Micromus angulatus =

Species of lacewing

Micromus angulatus is a species of brown lacewing in the family Hemerobiidae. It is found in Africa, Europe and Northern Asia (excluding China), North America, and Southern Asia.

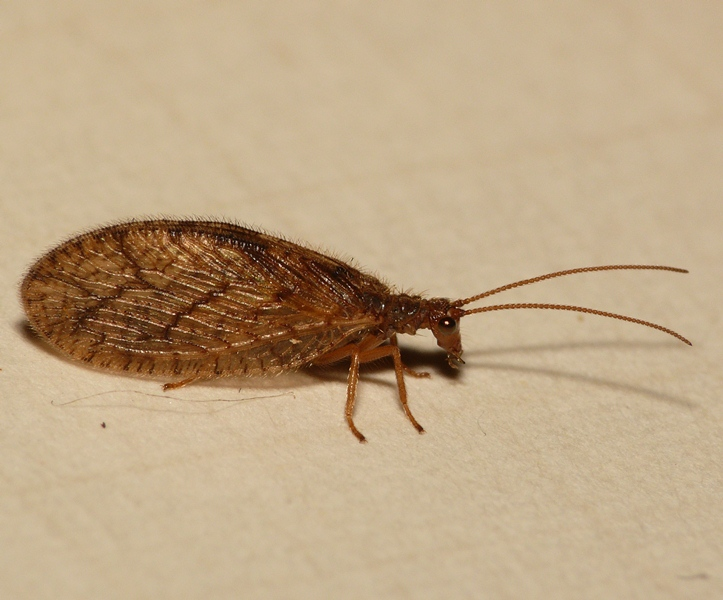
