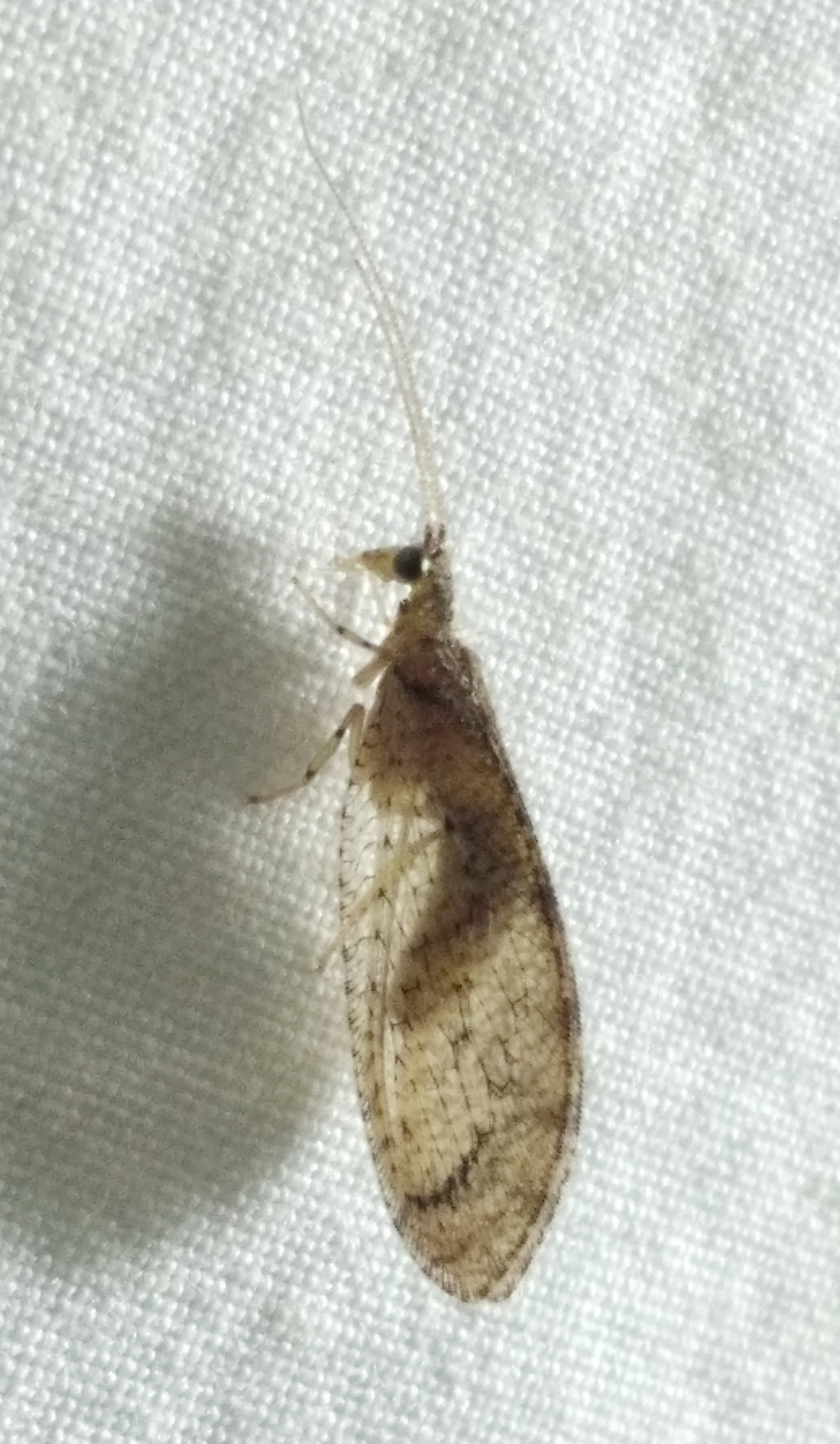

Scientific classification
- Domain: Eukaryota
- Kingdom: Animalia
- Phylum: Arthropoda
- Class: Insecta
- Order: Neuroptera
- Family: Hemerobiidae
- Genus: Nusalala
- Species: N. tessellata

Binomial name
- Nusalala tessellata (Gerstaecker, 1888)

= Nusalala tessellata =

Species of insect

Nusalala tessellata is a species of insect from the genus Nusalala. It has been known to prey upon Bemisia tabaci.

== Range ==
The species has been observed in the Neotropical realm of South America, Middle America (Americas) and the Caribbean.
