= Sympherobius umbratus =

Scientific classification
- Kingdom: Animalia
- Phylum: Arthropoda
- Clade: Pancrustacea
- Class: Insecta
- Order: Neuroptera
- Family: Hemerobiidae
- Genus: Sympherobius
- Species: S. umbratus

Binomial name
- Sympherobius umbratus (Banks, 1903)

Species of lacewing

Sympherobius umbratus is a species of brown lacewing in the family Hemerobiidae. It is found in North America.

Sympherobius umbratus belongs to the genus Sympherobius, and family Hemerobiidae.There is no listed species like this.
