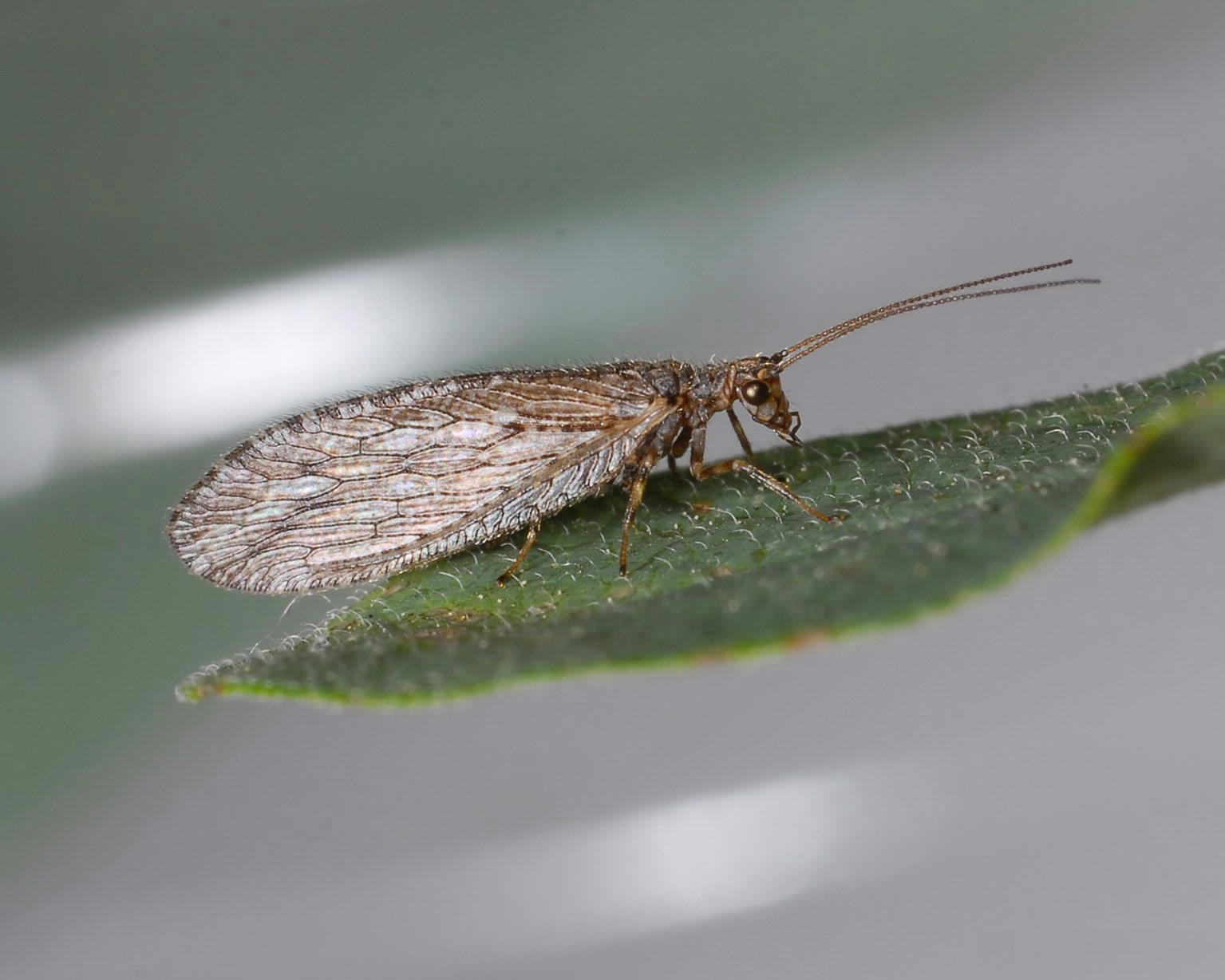

Scientific classification
- Domain: Eukaryota
- Kingdom: Animalia
- Phylum: Arthropoda
- Class: Insecta
- Order: Neuroptera
- Family: Hemerobiidae
- Genus: Micromus
- Species: M. variolosus

Binomial name
- Micromus variolosus Hagen, 1886

= Micromus variolosus =

Species of lacewing

Micromus variolosus is a species of brown lacewing in the family Hemerobiidae. It is found in North America.
