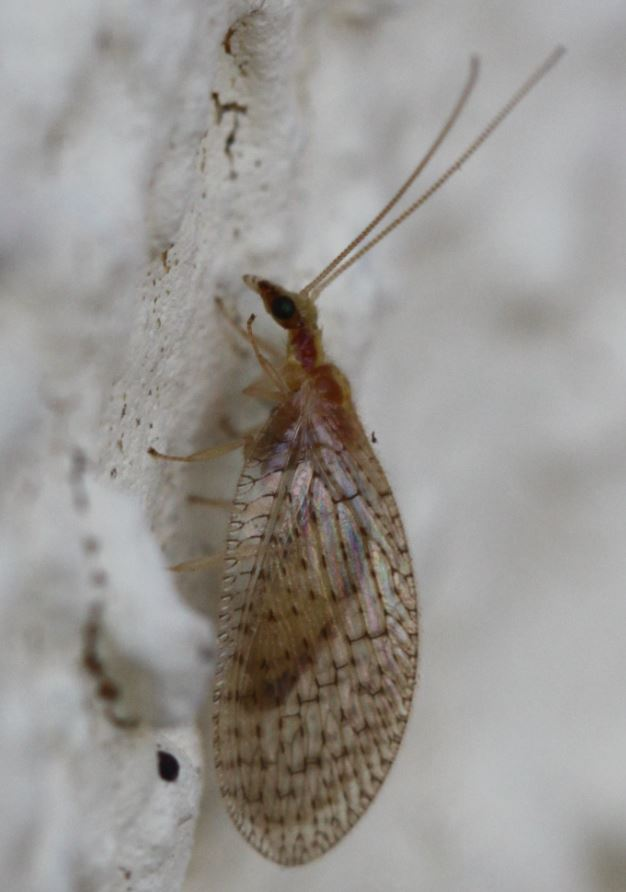
- Hemerobius humulinus

Scientific classification
- Kingdom: Animalia
- Phylum: Arthropoda
- Class: Insecta
- Order: Neuroptera
- Family: Hemerobiidae
- Subfamily: Hemerobiinae; Latreille, 1802

= Hemerobiinae =

Subfamily of lacewings

Hemerobiinae is a subfamily of brown lacewings in the family Hemerobiidae. There are about 5 genera and at least 60 described species in Hemerobiinae.

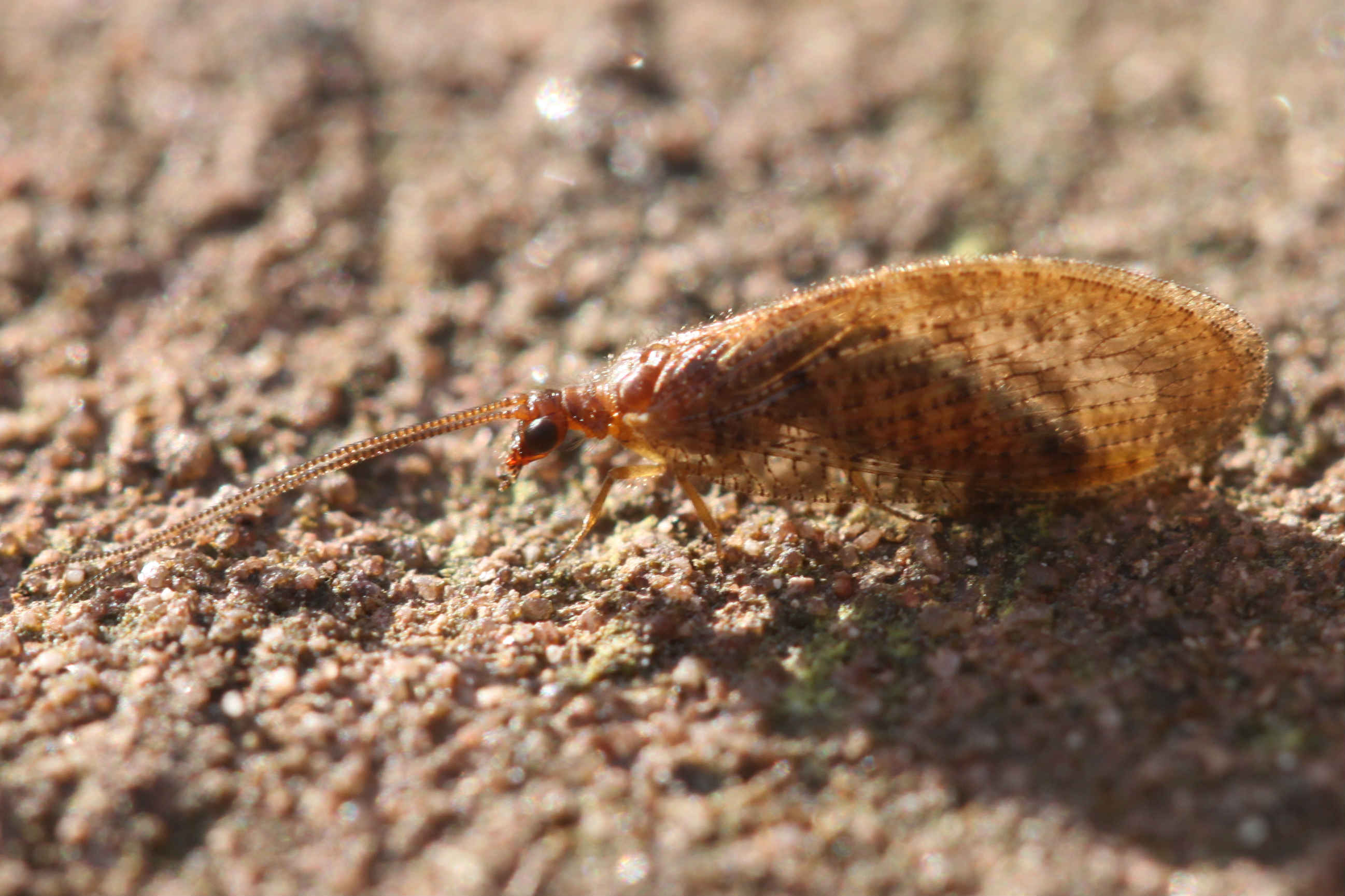
Hemerobius stigma

== Genera ==
These five genera belong to the subfamily Hemerobiinae:

- Hemerobiella Kimmins, 1940^{i c g}
- Hemerobius Linnaeus, 1758^{i c g b}
- Nesobiella Kimmins, 1935^{i c g}
- Nusalala Navás, 1913^{i c g}
- Wesmaelius Krueger, 1922^{i c g b}

Data sources: i = ITIS, c = Catalogue of Life, g = GBIF, b = Bugguide.net
