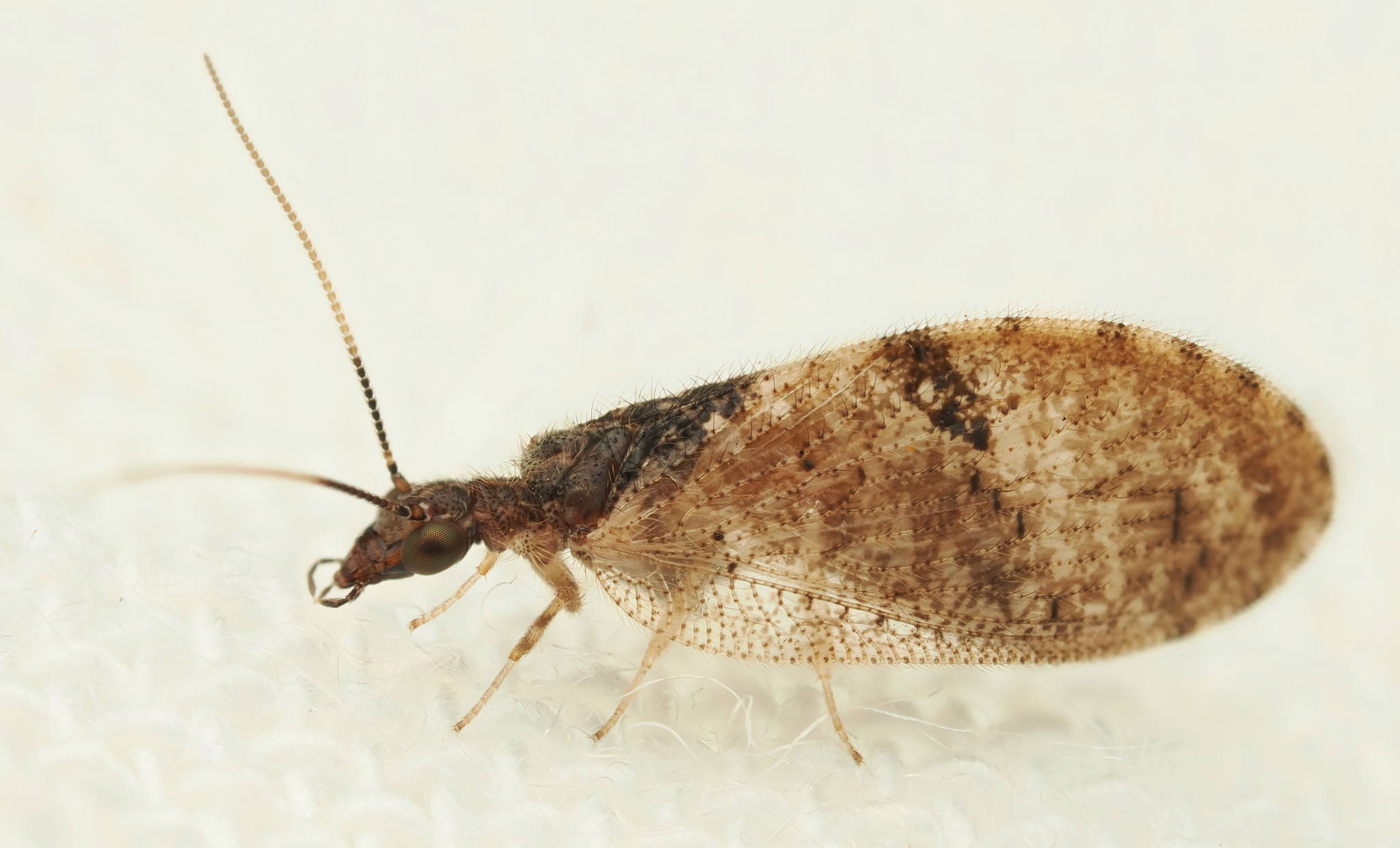

Scientific classification
- Domain: Eukaryota
- Kingdom: Animalia
- Phylum: Arthropoda
- Class: Insecta
- Order: Neuroptera
- Family: Hemerobiidae
- Genus: Sympherobius
- Species: S. barberi

Binomial name
- Sympherobius barberi (Banks, 1903)

= Sympherobius barberi =

Species of lacewing

Sympherobius barberi, or Barber's brown lacewing, is a species of brown lacewing in the family Hemerobiidae. It is found in Europe and Northern Asia (excluding China), Central America, North America, Oceania, and South America. The species was introduced to New Zealand to prey on aphids and mealybugs, first noted in 1936, however was not able to be established.
