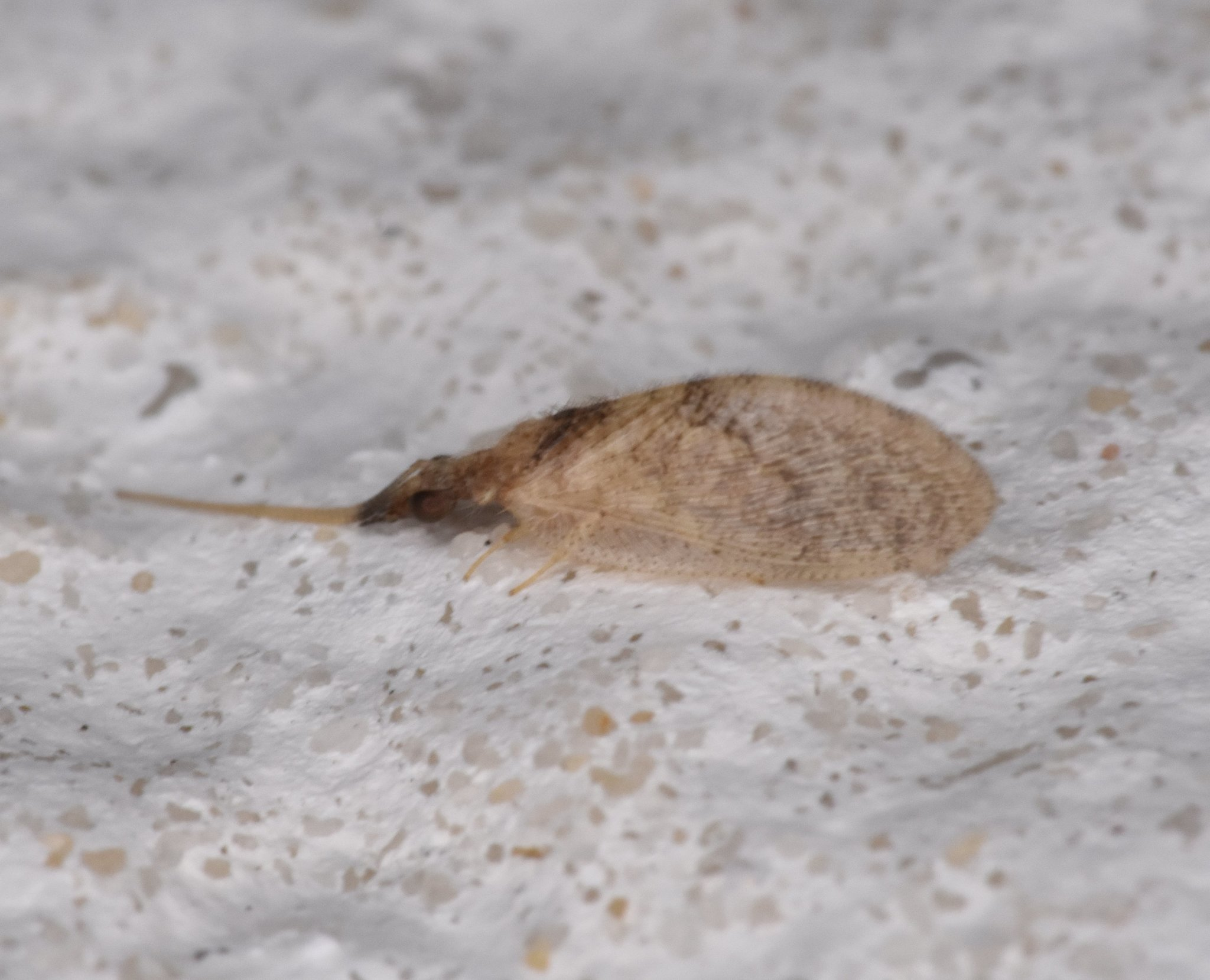

Scientific classification
- Domain: Eukaryota
- Kingdom: Animalia
- Phylum: Arthropoda
- Class: Insecta
- Order: Neuroptera
- Family: Hemerobiidae
- Genus: Sympherobius
- Species: S. amiculus

Binomial name
- Sympherobius amiculus (Fitch, 1855)

= Sympherobius amiculus =

Species of lacewing

Sympherobius amiculus is a species of brown lacewing in the family Hemerobiidae. It is found in the Caribbean Sea and North America.
