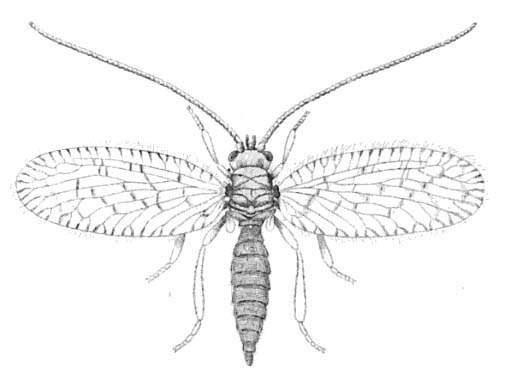

Scientific classification
- Kingdom: Animalia
- Phylum: Arthropoda
- Clade: Pancrustacea
- Class: Insecta
- Order: Neuroptera
- Family: Hemerobiidae
- Genus: Psectra
- Species: P. diptera

Binomial name
- Psectra diptera (Burmeister, 1839)

= Psectra diptera =

Species of lacewing

Psectra diptera is a species of brown lacewing in the family Hemerobiidae. It is found in Europe and Northern Asia (excluding China) and North America. The species possesses a wingspan of only 5 to 9 mm. It exhibits a strong ecological preference for low, dense vegetation situated in damp or marshy habitats.
