= Sympherobius californicus =

Scientific classification
- Domain: Eukaryota
- Kingdom: Animalia
- Phylum: Arthropoda
- Class: Insecta
- Order: Neuroptera
- Family: Hemerobiidae
- Genus: Sympherobius
- Species: S. californicus

Binomial name
- Sympherobius californicus Banks, 1911

Species of lacewing

Sympherobius californicus is a species of brown lacewing in the family Hemerobiidae. It is found in Central America, North America, and Oceania. The species was introduced to New Zealand to prey on aphids and mealybugs affecting crops, first noted in 1936, however was not able to be established.
