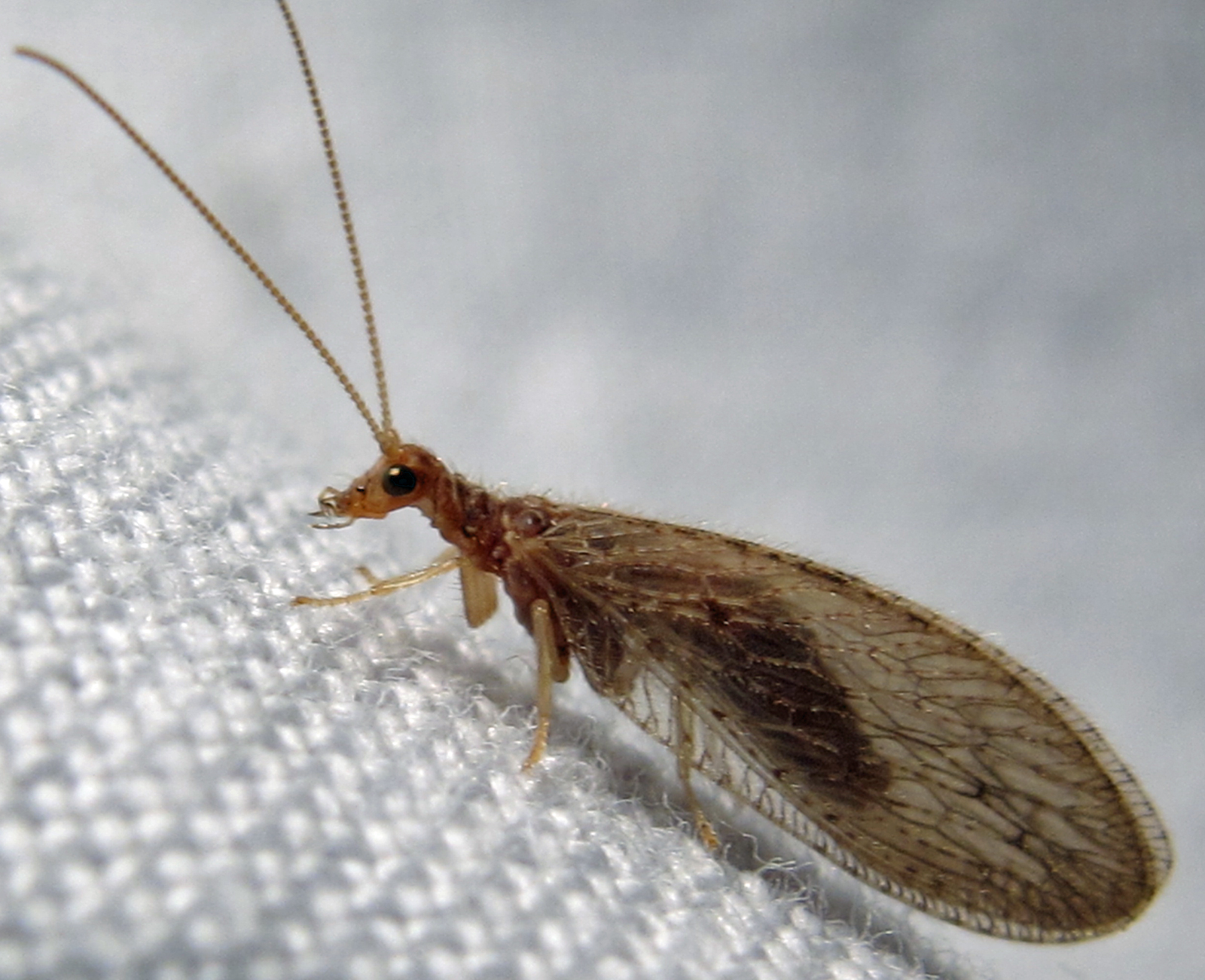

Scientific classification
- Domain: Eukaryota
- Kingdom: Animalia
- Phylum: Arthropoda
- Class: Insecta
- Order: Neuroptera
- Family: Hemerobiidae
- Genus: Micromus
- Species: M. subanticus

Binomial name
- Micromus subanticus (Walker, 1853)

Synonyms
- Menutus haitiensis (Smith, 1931)

= Micromus subanticus =

Species of lacewing

Micromus subanticus is a species of brown lacewing in the family Hemerobiidae. It is found in the Caribbean, Europe and Northern Asia (excluding China), Central America, and North America.
