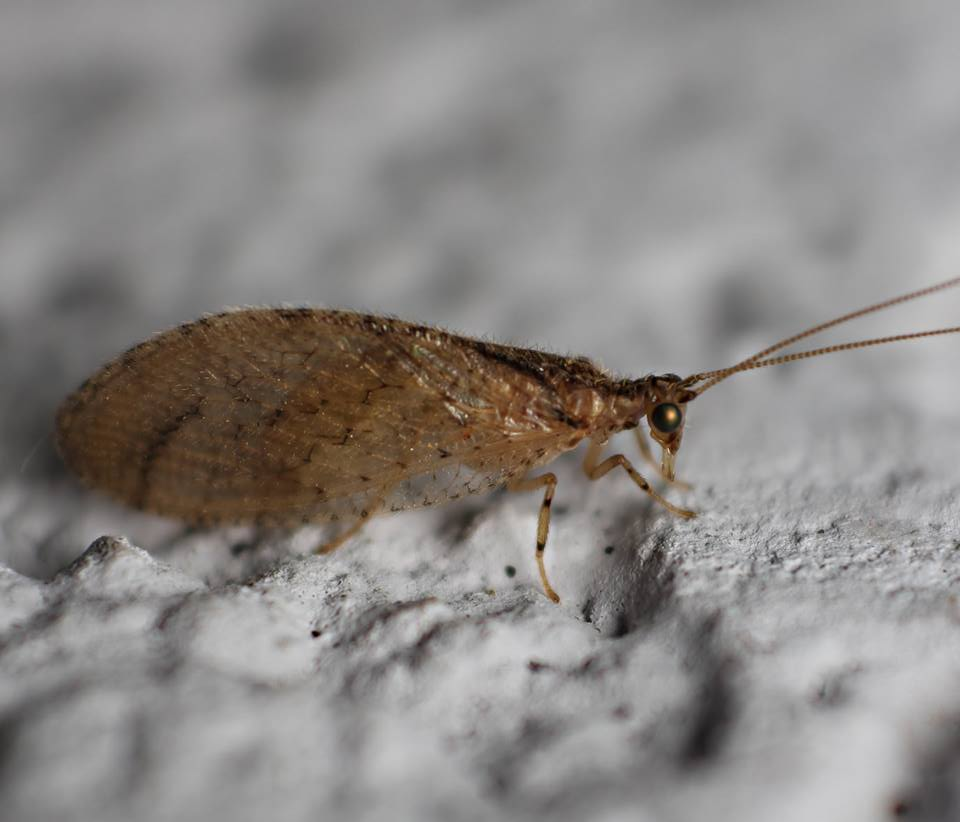

Scientific classification
- Kingdom: Animalia
- Phylum: Arthropoda
- Clade: Pancrustacea
- Class: Insecta
- Order: Neuroptera
- Family: Hemerobiidae
- Subfamily: Microminae
- Genus: Nusalala; Navás, 1913

Type species
- Nusalala erecta Navás, 1913
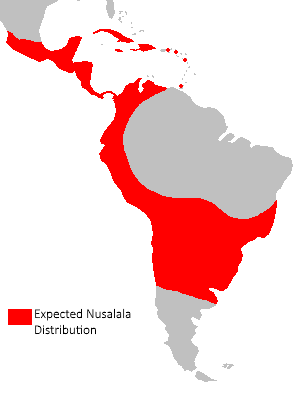
- Distribution of Nusalala

= Nusalala =

Genus of lacewings

Nusalala is a genus of brown lacewings. The scientific name was published in 1913 by Longinos Navás. They belong to the subfamily Microminae, as do the genera Micromus and Megalomina.
Some species of this genus, such as Nusalala brachyptera, are "brachypter" meaning short wings, and have lost the ability to fly; they can only jump. This phenomenon has evolved in a number of genera in the family Hemerobiidae

This genus have an exclusive neotropical distribution (South America, Central America and the Caribbean). As well, the distribution is limited in the South Cone and steppes, where its humidity and temperature conditions may not be enough, and in rain forests, despite their tropical nature.

== Species ==
- Nusalala andina Penny & Sturm, 1984
- Nusalala brachyptera Oswald, 1997
- Nusalala camposina Navás, 1929
- Nusalala championi Kimmins, 1936
- Nusalala colombiensis Banks, 1910
- Nusalala cubana Hagen, 1886
- Nusalala dispar Banks, 1910
- Nusalala erecta Navás, 1913
- Nusalala ghioi Monserrat, 2000
- Nusalala ilusionata Monserrat, 2004
- Nusalala irrebita Navás, 1929
- Nusalala marginata Navás, 1926
- Nusalala marini Monserrat, 2000
- Nusalala navasi Kimmins, 1936
- Nusalala neotropica Esben-Petersen, 1914
- Nusalala payasi Monserrat, 2000
- Nusalala tessellata Gerstaecker, 1888
- Nusalala uncata Kimmins, 1936
- Nusalala unguicaudata Monserrat, 2000
