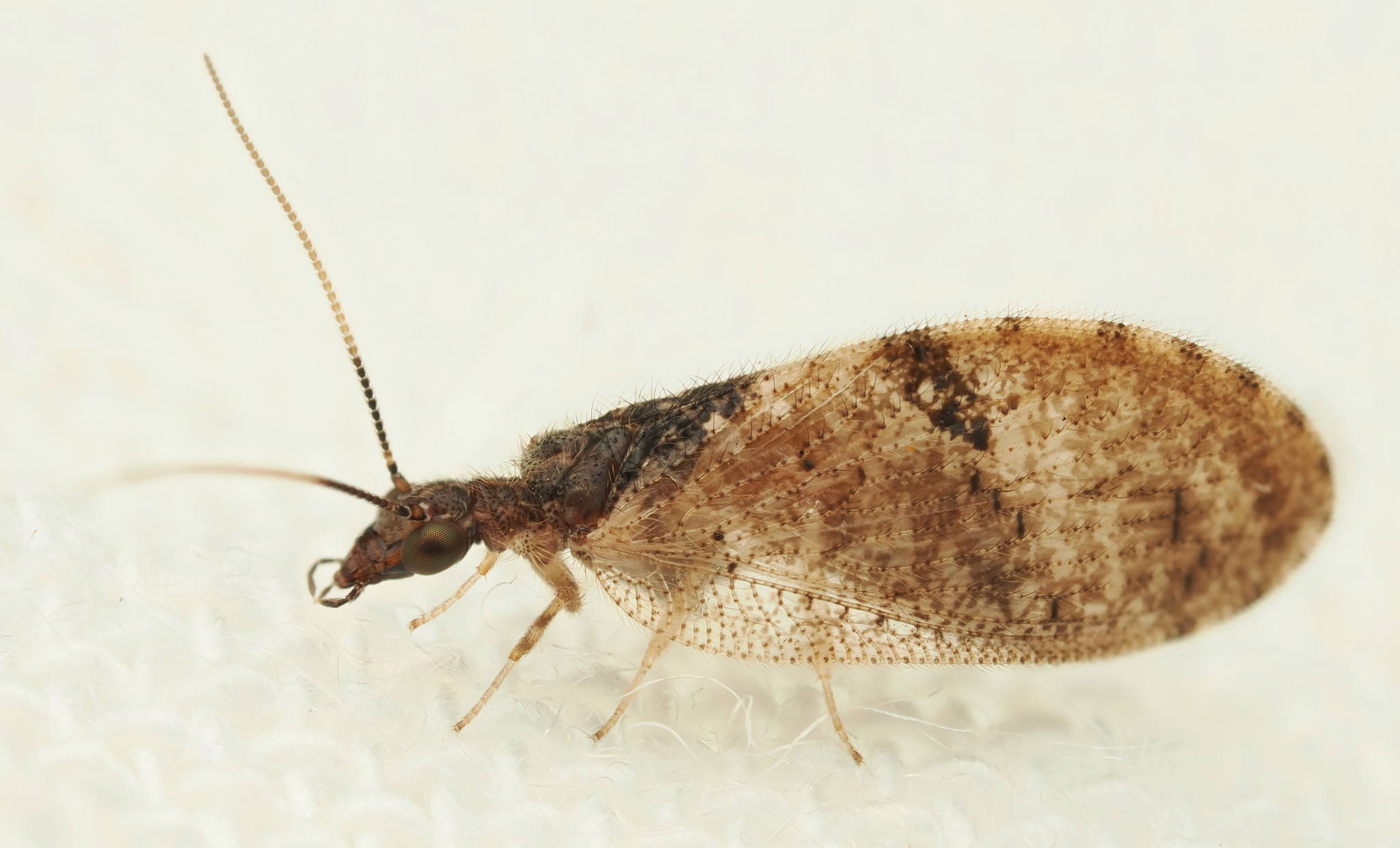
- Sympherobius barberi from San Marcos, Texas.

Scientific classification
- Domain: Eukaryota
- Kingdom: Animalia
- Phylum: Arthropoda
- Class: Insecta
- Order: Neuroptera
- Family: Hemerobiidae
- Genus: Sympherobius; Banks, 1904

Synonyms
- Sympheromima Kimmins, 1928

= Sympherobius =

Genus of lacewings

Sympherobius is a genus of brown lacewings in the family Hemerobiidae. There are at least 50 described species in Sympherobius.

== Species ==
- Sympherobius amazonicus Penny and Monserrat, 1985
- Sympherobius amiculus (Fitch, 1855)
- Sympherobius angustus (Banks, 1904)
- Sympherobius ariasi Penny and Monserrat, 1985
- Sympherobius arizonicus Banks, 1911
- Sympherobius axillaris Navás, 1928
- Sympherobius barberi (Banks, 1903) (Barber's brown lacewing)
- Sympherobius beameri Gurney, 1948
- Sympherobius bifasciatus Banks, 1911
- Sympherobius bisignatus (Krüger, 1922)
- Sympherobius blanchardi (Navás, 1930)
- Sympherobius californicus Banks, 1911
- Sympherobius completus Makarkin & Wedmann, 2009
- Sympherobius constrictus Oswald, 1988
- Sympherobius dilutus Nakahara, 1960
- Sympherobius distinctus Carpenter, 1940
- Sympherobius domesticus Nakahara, 1954
- Sympherobius elegans (Stephens, 1836)
- Sympherobius exiguus (Navás, 1908)
- Sympherobius fallax Navás, 1908
- Sympherobius fuscescens (Wallengren, 1863)
- Sympherobius fuscinervis Kozhanchikov, 1956
- Sympherobius gayi Navás, 1910
- Sympherobius gratiosus Navás, 1908
- Sympherobius hainanus C.-k. Yang & Z.-q. Liu, 2002
- Sympherobius humilis Navás, 1914
- Sympherobius innoceus Steinmann, 1965
- Sympherobius insulanus Banks, 1938
- Sympherobius intermedius Monserrat, 1998
- Sympherobius intervenalis Banks, 1915
- Sympherobius killingtoni Carpenter, 1940
- Sympherobius klapaleki Zelený, 1963
- Sympherobius limbus Carpenter, 1940
- Sympherobius luqueti Leraut, 1991
- Sympherobius manchuricus Nakahara, 1960
- Sympherobius marginatus (Kimmins, 1928)
- Sympherobius marmoratipennis (Blanchard in Gay, 1851)
- Sympherobius mirandus (Navás, 1920)
- Sympherobius notatus Kimmins, 1932
- Sympherobius occidentalis (Fitch, 1855)
- Sympherobius parvus (Krüger, 1922)
- Sympherobius pellucidus (Walker, 1853)
- Sympherobius perparvus (McLachlan, 1869)
- Sympherobius piceaticus C.-k. Yang & D.-p. Yan, 1990
- Sympherobius pictus (Banks, 1904)
- Sympherobius pygmaeus (Rambur, 1842)
- Sympherobius quadricuspis Oswald, 1988
- Sympherobius riudori Navás, 1915
- Sympherobius scriptus (Navás, 1917)
- Sympherobius signatus (Krüger, 1922)
- Sympherobius similis Carpenter, 1940
- Sympherobius siriae Jepson et al., 2010
- Sympherobius subcostalis Monserrat, 1990
- Sympherobius tessellatus Nakahara, 1915
- Sympherobius tuomurensis C.-k. Yang et al in Huang et al., 1985
- Sympherobius umbratus (Banks, 1903)
- Sympherobius wuyianus C.-k. Yang, 1981
- Sympherobius yunpinus C.-k. Yang, 1986
- Sympherobius zelenyi Alayo, 1968
