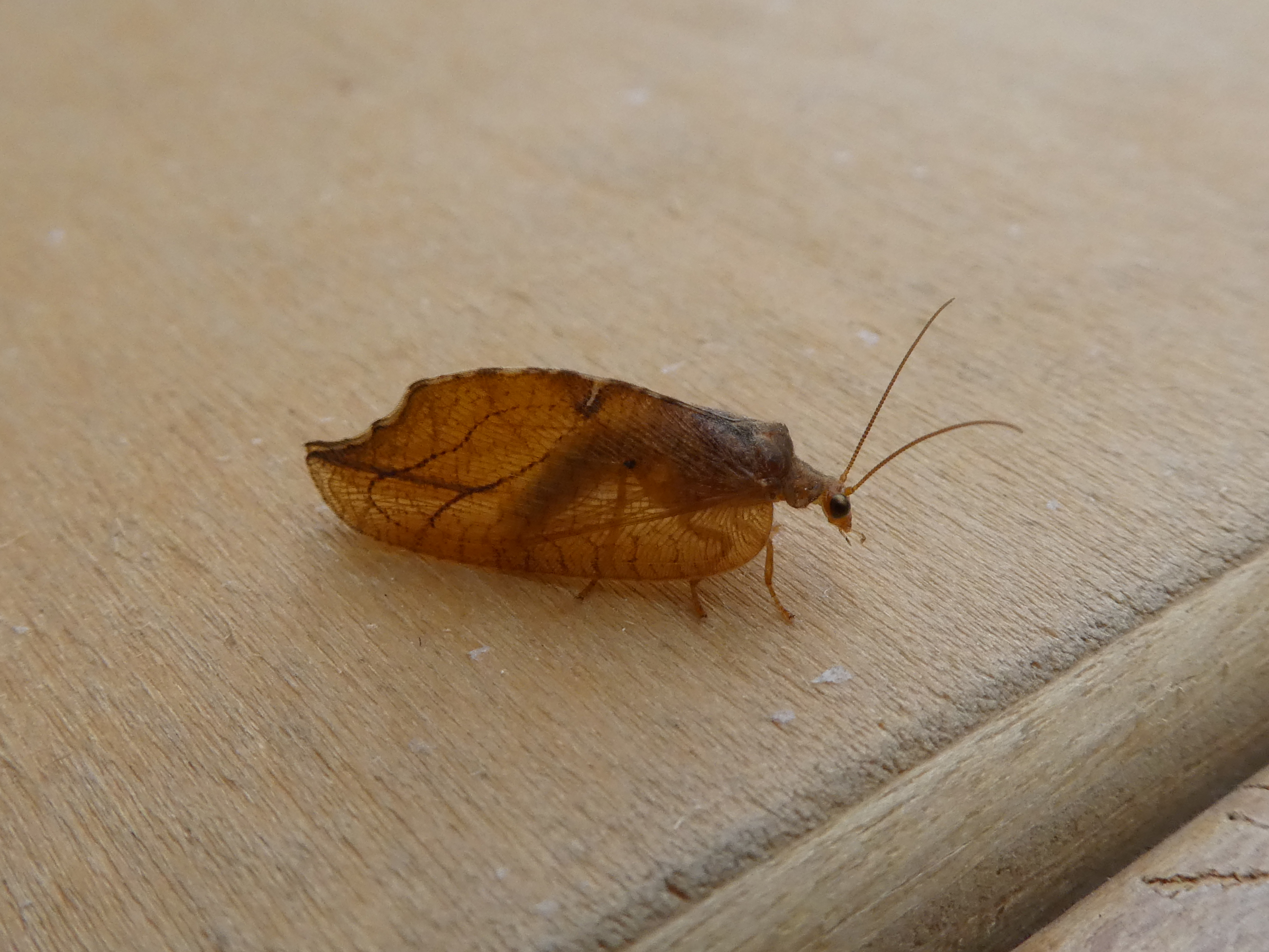
- Drepanepteryx phalaenoides

Scientific classification
- Kingdom: Animalia
- Phylum: Arthropoda
- Class: Insecta
- Order: Neuroptera
- Family: Hemerobiidae
- Genus: Drepanepteryx; Leach, 1815

= Drepanepteryx =

Genus of insects

Drepanepteryx is a genus of insects belonging to the family Hemerobiidae.

The species of this genus are found in Eurasia.

Species:

- Drepanepteryx algida (Erichson, 1851)
- Drepanepteryx calida (Krüger, 1922)
