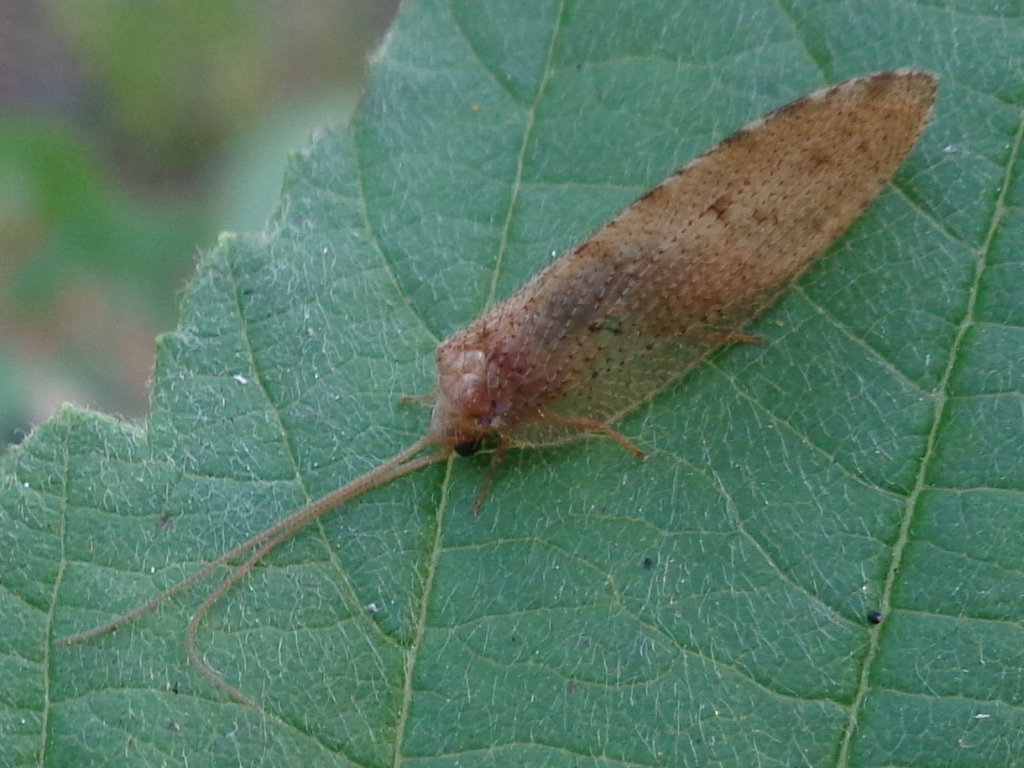
- Wesmaelius concinnus

Scientific classification
- Domain: Eukaryota
- Kingdom: Animalia
- Phylum: Arthropoda
- Class: Insecta
- Order: Neuroptera
- Family: Hemerobiidae
- Subfamily: Hemerobiinae
- Genus: Wesmaelius; Krüger, 1922

= Wesmaelius =

Genus of insects

Wesmaelius is a genus of net-winged insects, belonging to the family Hemerobiidae.

The genus was described in 1922 by Krüger.

The genus has cosmopolitan distribution.

Species:

- Wesmaelius brunneus (Banks, 1920)
- Wesmaelius coloradensis (Banks, 1897)
- Wesmaelius constrictus (Parfin, 1956)
- Wesmaelius fumatus (Carpenter, 1940)
- Wesmaelius furcatus (Banks, 1935)
- Wesmaelius involutus (Carpenter, 1940)
- Wesmaelius longifrons (Walker, 1853)
- Wesmaelius longipennis (Banks, 1920)
- Wesmaelius mathewesi Makarkin, Archibald, & Oswald, 2003
- Wesmaelius nervosus (Fabricius, 1793)
- Wesmaelius posticatus (Banks, 1905)
- Wesmaelius pretiosus (Banks, 1908)
- Wesmaelius schwarzi (Banks, 1903)
- Wesmaelius subnebulosus (Stephens, 1836)
- Wesmaelius yukonensis Klimaszewski & Kevan, 1987
