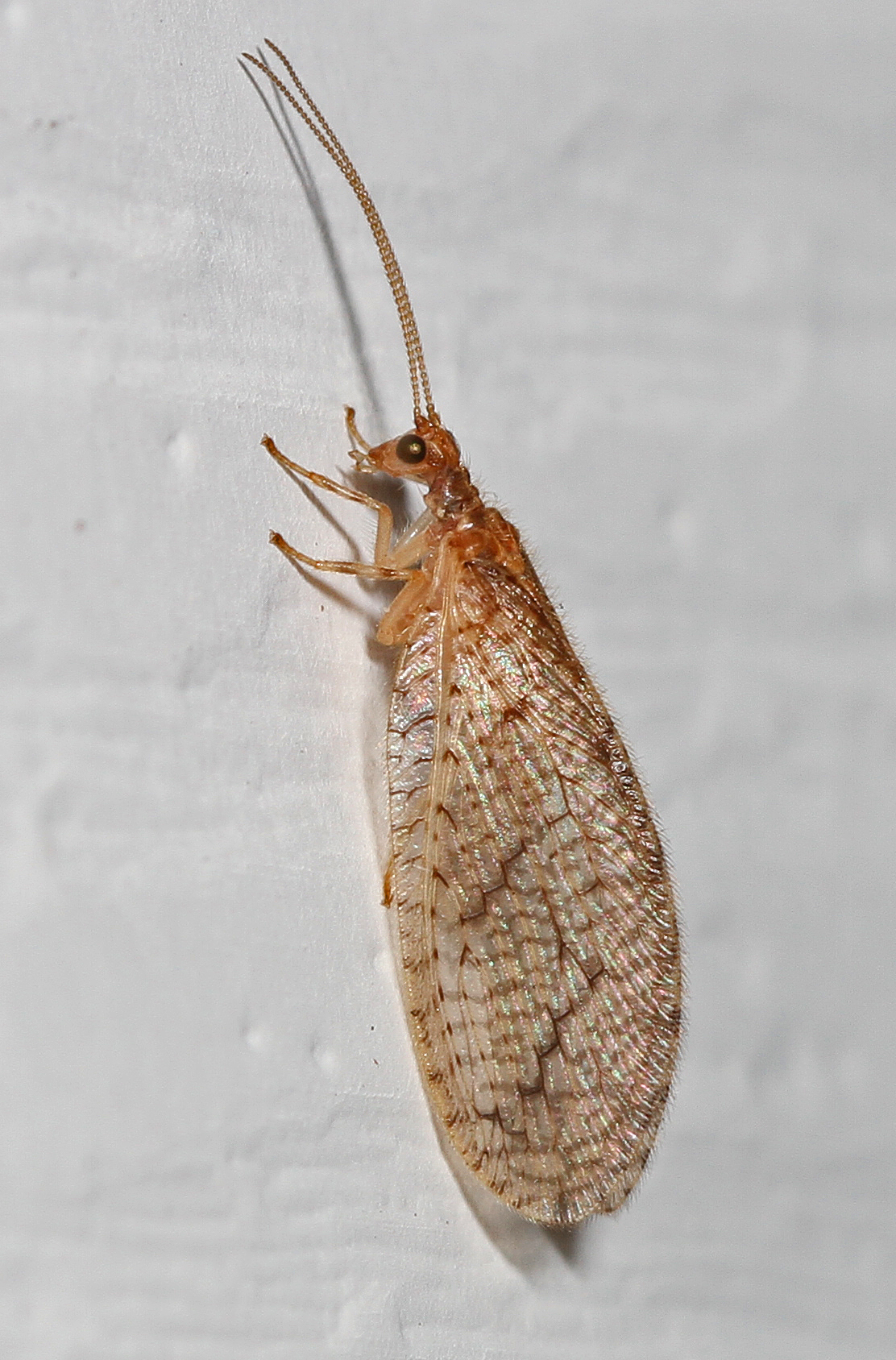

Scientific classification
- Kingdom: Animalia
- Phylum: Arthropoda
- Clade: Pancrustacea
- Class: Insecta
- Order: Neuroptera
- Family: Hemerobiidae
- Genus: Micromus
- Species: M. posticus

Binomial name
- Micromus posticus (Walker, 1853)

Synonyms
- Pseudomicromus insipidus (Hagen, 1861)

= Micromus posticus =

Species of lacewing

Micromus posticus is a species of brown lacewing in the family Hemerobiidae. It is found in the Caribbean, Central America, and North America. Both larvae and adults feed on aphids.

== Identification ==
Micromus posticus measures between 7 and 9.5 mm from length to wingtip. Adults are macropterous. Micromus posticus can be identified by the inner gradate veins on the forewing, which are separated by a distance less than or equal to their length. They also lack conspicuous markings on the face.

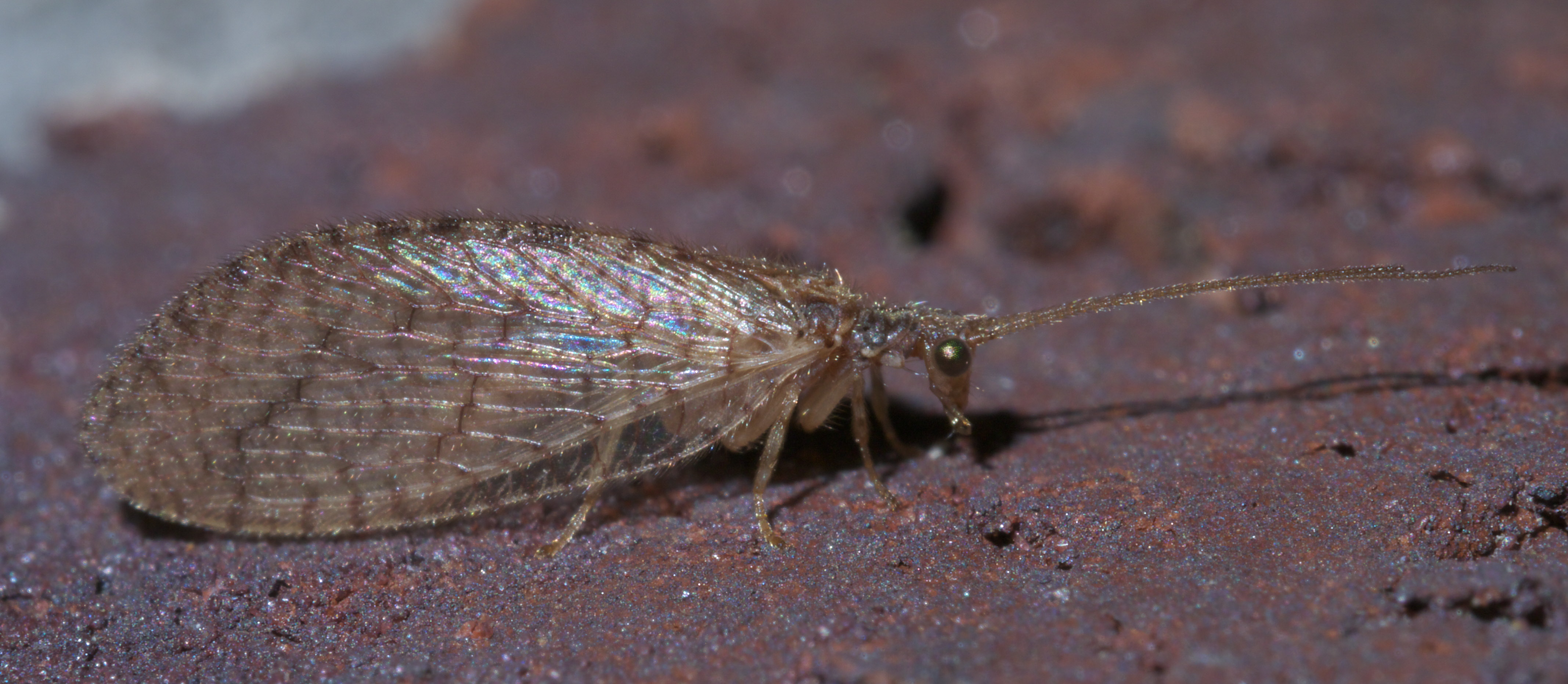
Micromus posticus, Pryor, OK, USA
