= Wesmaelius mathewesi =

Wesmaelius mathewesi Temporal range: Ypresian

Scientific classification
- Kingdom: Animalia
- Phylum: Arthropoda
- Clade: Pancrustacea
- Class: Insecta
- Order: Neuroptera
- Family: Hemerobiidae
- Genus: Wesmaelius
- Species: †W. mathewesi

Binomial name
- †Wesmaelius mathewesi Makarkin, Archibald, & Oswald, 2003

Extinct species of insect

Wesmaelius mathewesi is an extinct species of lacewing in the neuropteran family Hemerobiidae known from an Eocene fossil found in North America

== History and classification ==
W. mathewesi is known from the solitary holotype specimen, number Q-0092, a single mostly complete forewing which was preserved as a compression-impression fossil preserved in shale. The fossil was recovered from outcrops of the Coldwater Formation in the Quilchena, British Columbia area by Rolf Mathewes in 1976. The type specimen was preserved in the Department of Paleobiology collections of Simon Fraser University in Burnaby, British Columbia, Canada at the time of description. W. mathewesi was first mentioned and briefly commented on by S. Bruce Archibald and Rolf Mathews of Simon Fraser University in 2000, and fully studied by Vladimir Makarkin of the Far Eastern Branch of the Russian Academy of Sciences, Archibald, and John D Oswald of Texas A&M University. Their 2003 type description of the new species was published in the journal The Canadian Entomologist. Makarkin et al coined the specific epithet mathewesi in honor of Rolf Mathewes for his work on the paleontology of the Quilchena site. At the time of the species description, Wesmaelius mathewesi was the most ancient member of Hemerobiinae and the first fossil species in the living genus Wesmaelius. Placement of the new species into Wesmaelius is considered tentative, and based on the crossvein structuring and positioning.

== Description ==
The forewing of W. mathewesi is missing the basal area and has a generally oblong outline. The wing is estimated to have been 7.5 mm (0.30 in) long by 4.0 mm (0.16 in) at its widest and there are distinct trichosors preserved. Unlike other species in the genus, the space formed by the radial 1 vein is narrow, and the third and fourth groups of cross veins run parallel to each other, rather than being convergent with the cubital vein. Additionally both series of crossveins reach the cubiatal-anal vein, while modern species of the family only show one of the two series reaching it. The costal area formed by the costal vein, is wide and has no crossveins preserved, though the area is rather poorly preserved.
