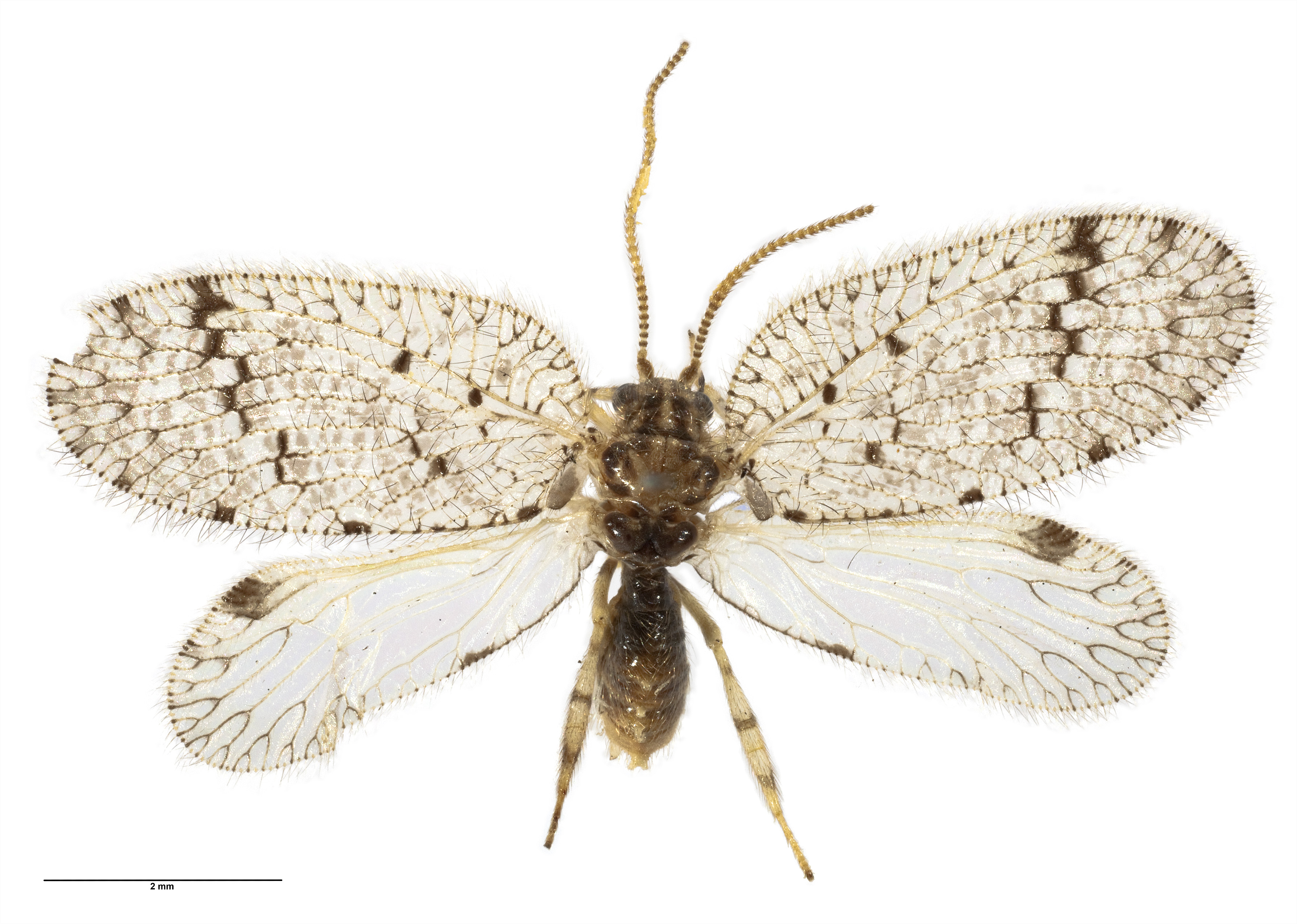
- Psectra nakaharai

Scientific classification
- Domain: Eukaryota
- Kingdom: Animalia
- Phylum: Arthropoda
- Class: Insecta
- Order: Neuroptera
- Family: Hemerobiidae
- Genus: Psectra; Hagen, 1866

= Psectra =

Genus of lacewings

Psectra is a genus of brown lacewings in the family Hemerobiidae. There are more than 20 described species in Psectra.

== Species ==
These 26 species belong to the genus Psectra:

- Psectra capensis (Kimmins, 1935)
- Psectra claudiensis New, 1988
- Psectra decorata (Nakahara, 1966)
- Psectra diptera (Burmeister, 1839)
- Psectra externa (Banks, 1909)
- Psectra fasciata (Esben-Petersen, 1928)
- Psectra franzeni (Kimmins, 1940)
- Psectra graeffei (Brauer, 1867)
- Psectra hageni (Banks, 1932)
- Psectra iniqua (Hagen, 1859)
- Psectra irregularis (Carpenter, 1961)
- Psectra jeanneli (Navás, 1914)
- Psectra latilobata New, 1989
- Psectra maculosa (Carpenter, 1961)
- Psectra minima (Banks, 1920)
- Psectra mombassina (Navás, 1936)
- Psectra mozambica Tjeder, 1961
- Psectra nakaharai New, 1988
- Psectra obliqua (Banks, 1909)
- Psectra oblonga (Esben-Petersen, 1928)
- Psectra oriomoense New, 1989
- Psectra pretiosa (Banks, 1909)
- Psectra siamica Nakahara & Kuwayama, 1960
- Psectra tillyardi (Kimmins, 1940)
- Psectra wilhelmensis New, 1989
- Psectra yunu C.-k. Yang, 1981
