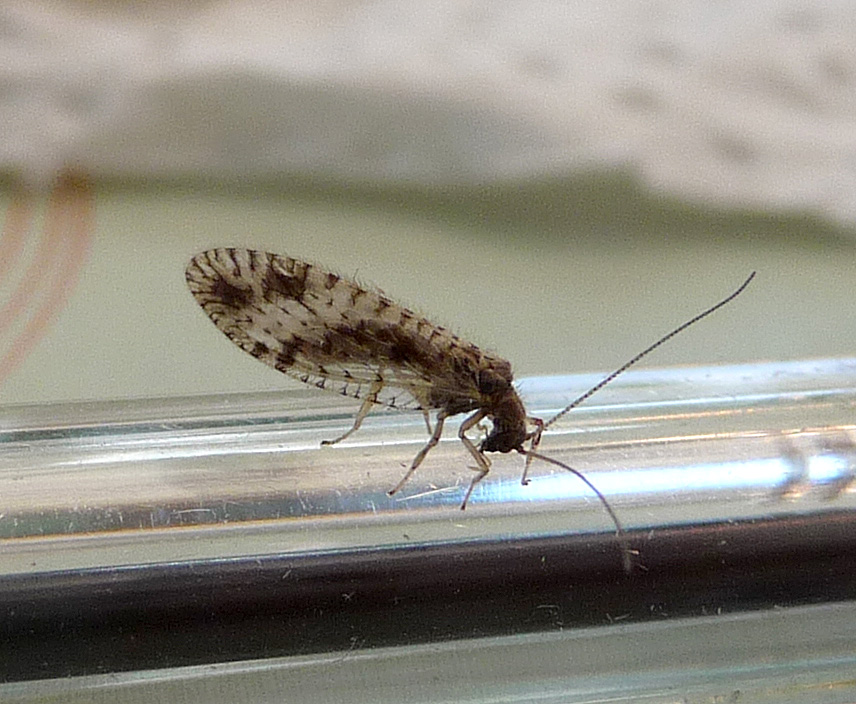

Scientific classification
- Kingdom: Animalia
- Phylum: Arthropoda
- Class: Insecta
- Order: Neuroptera
- Family: Hemerobiidae
- Genus: Micromus
- Species: M. variegatus

Binomial name
- Micromus variegatus (Fabricius, 1793)

= Micromus variegatus =

Species of lacewing

Micromus variegatus is a species of brown lacewing in the family Hemerobiidae. It is found in Europe, Northern Asia, (excluding China) and North America.

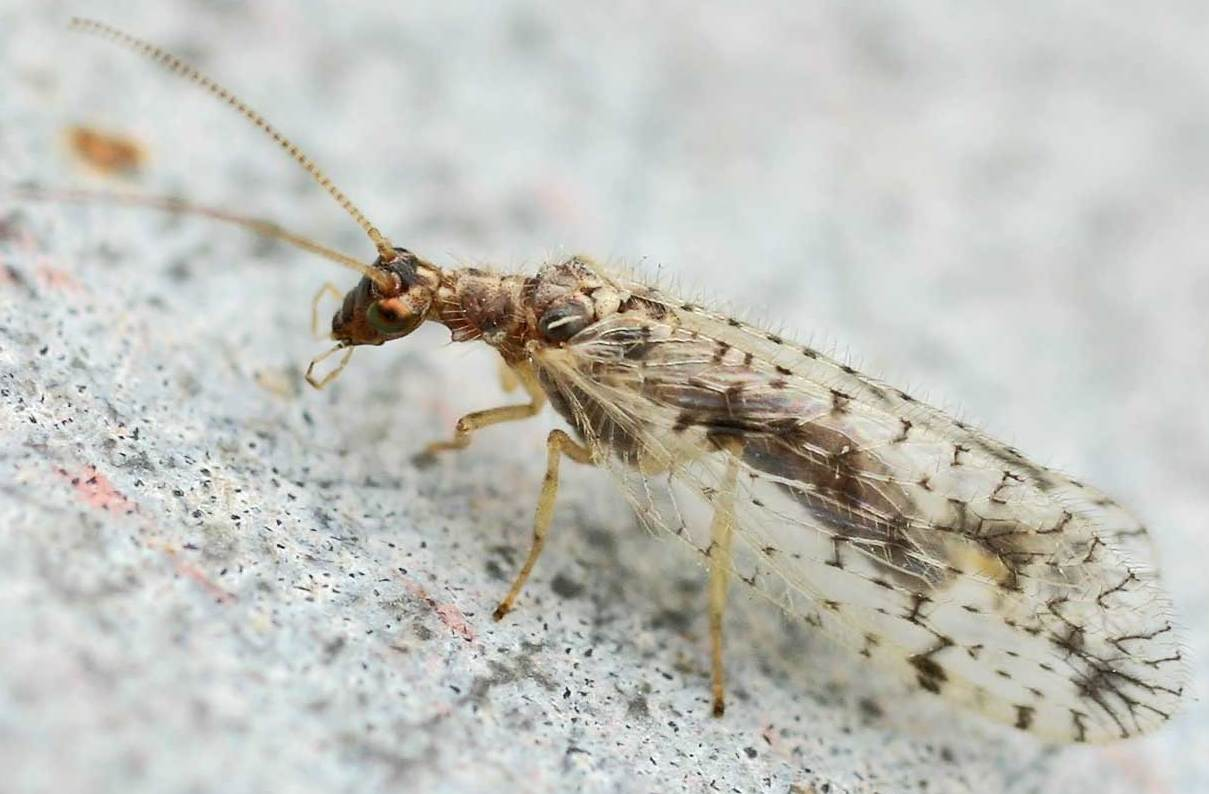

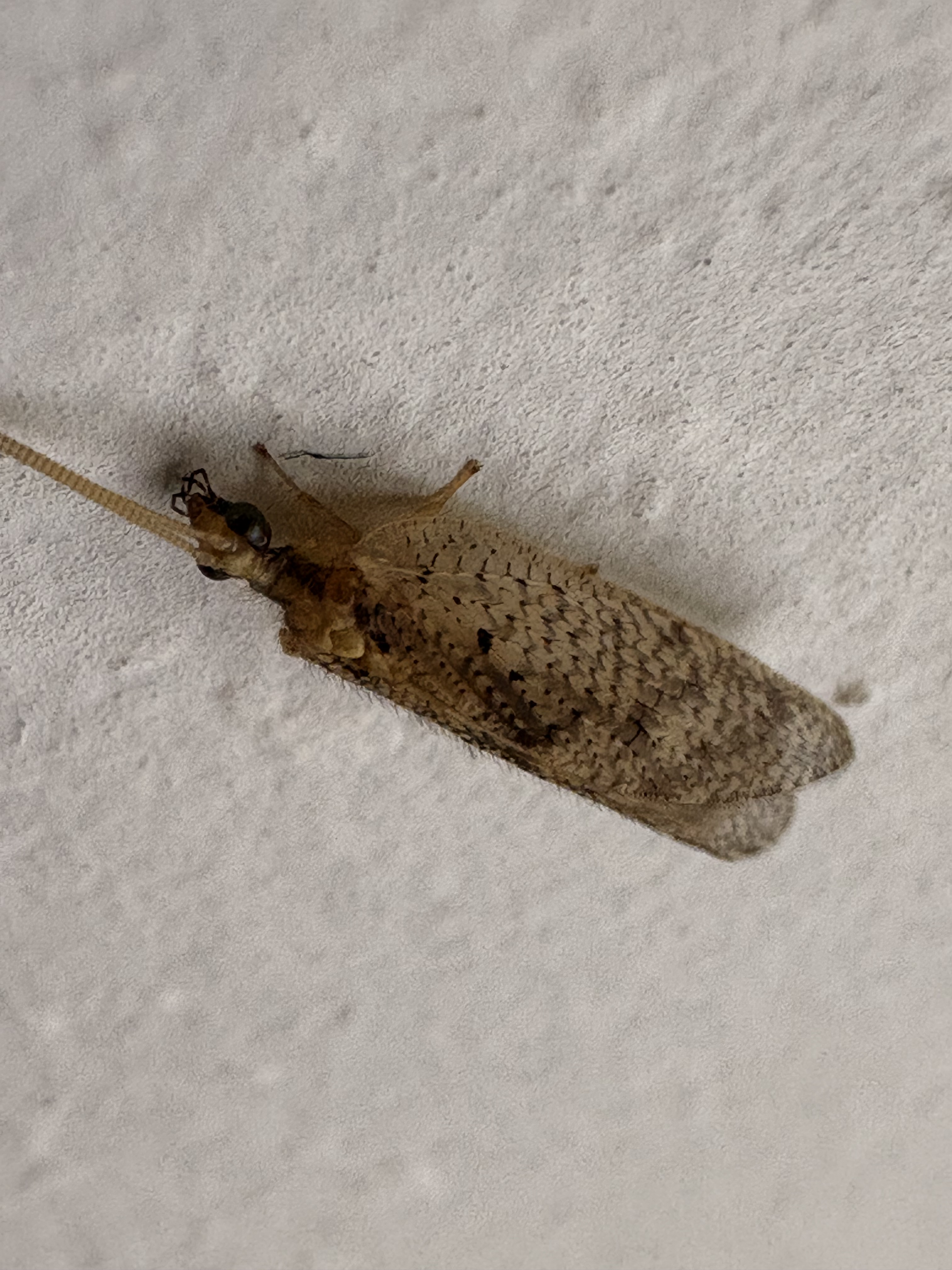
This is a picture of this cool bug
