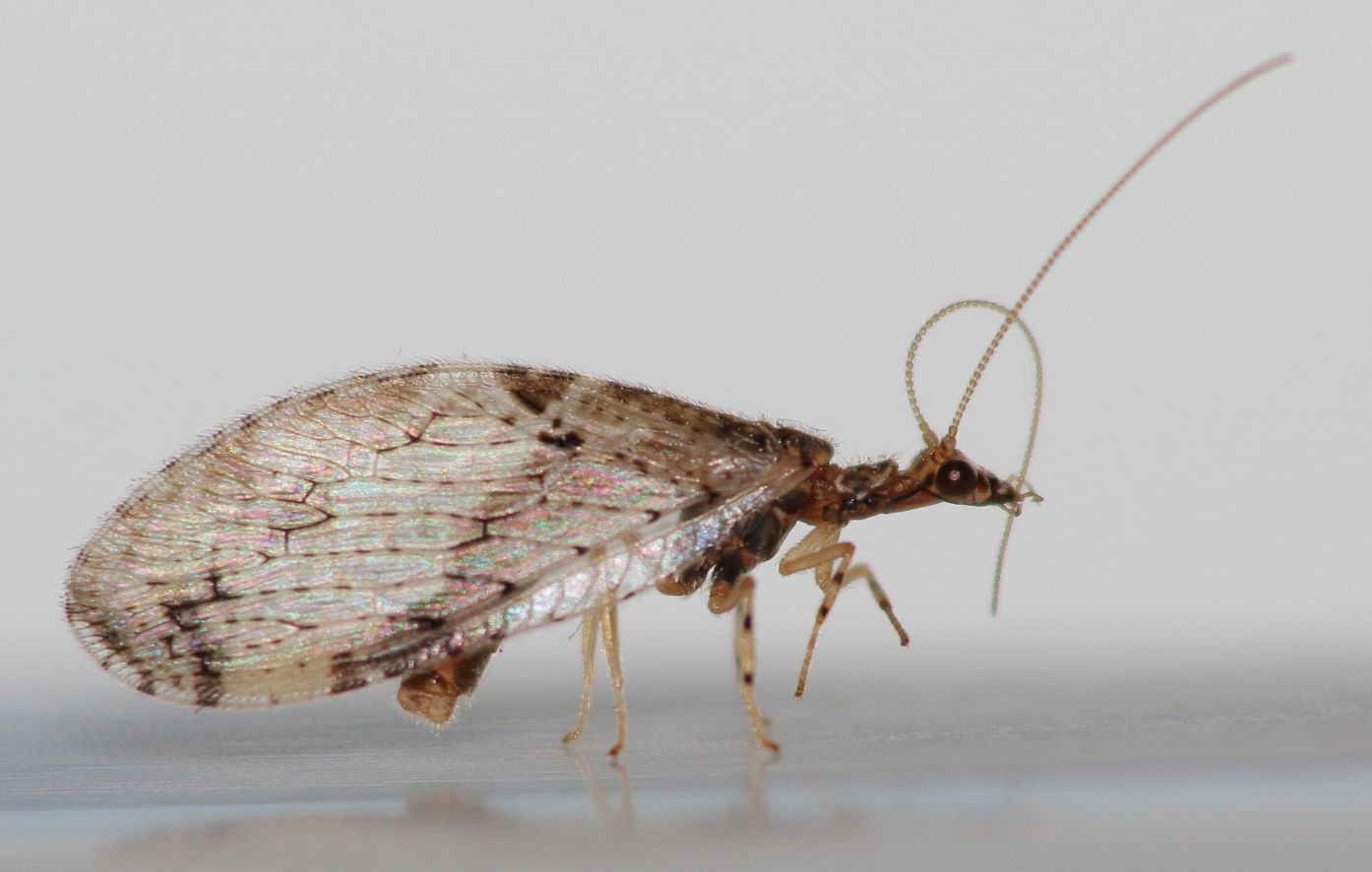
- Micromus africanus

Scientific classification
- Domain: Eukaryota
- Kingdom: Animalia
- Phylum: Arthropoda
- Class: Insecta
- Order: Neuroptera
- Family: Hemerobiidae
- Subfamily: Microminae; Krueger, 1922

= Microminae =

Subfamily of insects

Microminae is a subfamily of neuropteran insects of the family Hemerobiidae.

Includes the genera Micromus (with global distribution), Nusalala (with Neotropical distribution), Noius (New Caledonia), and Megalomina (Australia and New Guinea).

The subfamily is characterized by a single unambiguous synapomorphy, male abdominal tergites 9 and 10 fused (49:1), and two homoplasious transformations (23:1 and 37:1).

Recent studies place Drepanepteryginae as the sister subfamily of Microminae, with its last common ancestor estimated to have lived between 131-141 million years ago. The same study places the last common ancestor of all Microminae somewhere in between 112 and 118 million years ago.
