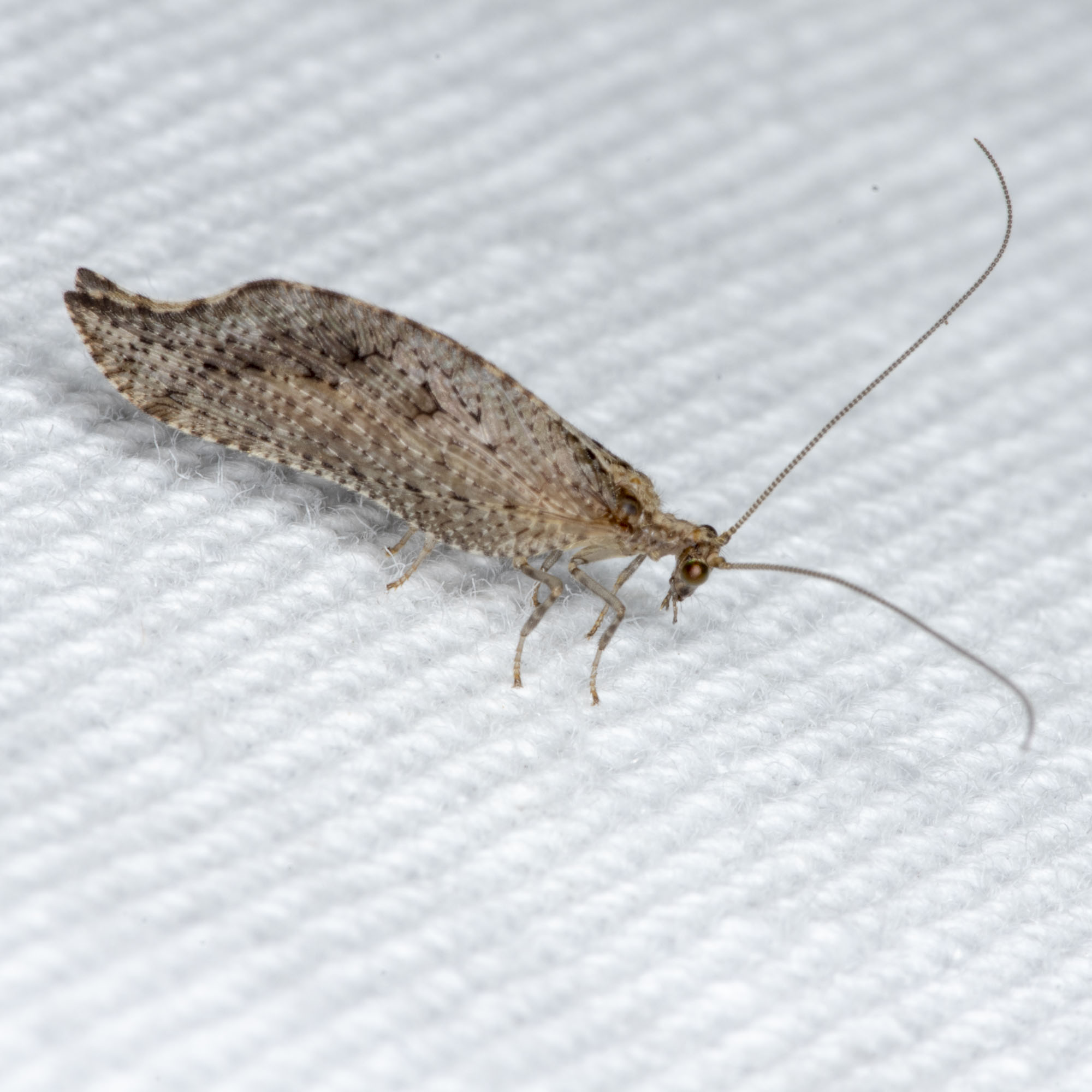
- Megalomina berothoides

Scientific classification
- Domain: Eukaryota
- Kingdom: Animalia
- Phylum: Arthropoda
- Class: Insecta
- Order: Neuroptera
- Family: Hemerobiidae
- Subfamily: Microminae
- Genus: Megalomina; Banks, 1905

Type species
- Megalomina acuminata Banks, 1905
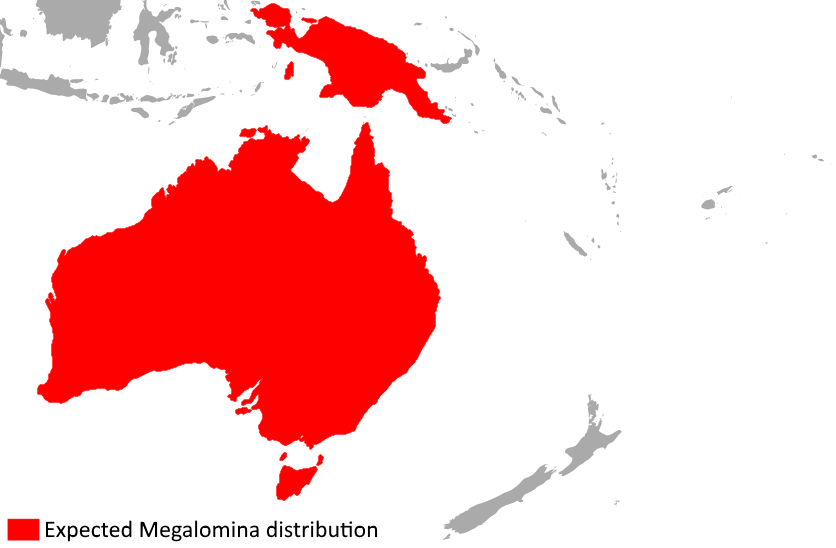
- Expected distribution of Megalomina

= Megalomina =

Genus of lacewings

Megalomina is an insect genus from the family of brown lacewings (Hemerobiidae), which belongs to the order Neuroptera. The scientific name of the genus is validly published for the first time by Nathan Banks in 1909.

The genus is poorly studied, and the known distribution is Oceania, in Australia and New Guinea. Banks designated Megalomina acuminata as a type of species, which occurs in Queensland, Australia.

== Species ==
- Megalomina acuminata
- Megalomina berothoides
- Megalomina bridwelli
