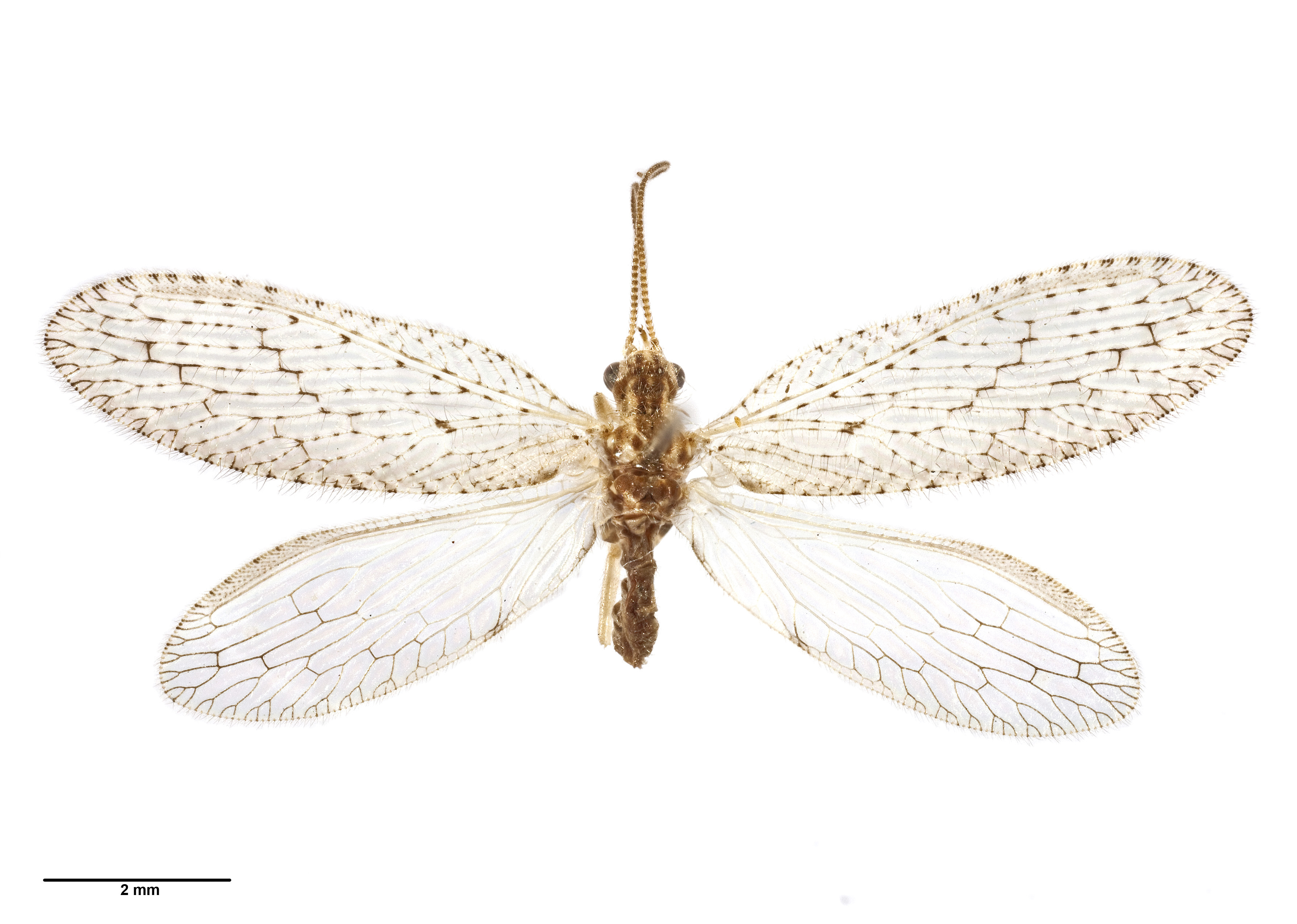
- Micromus tasmaniae

Scientific classification
- Kingdom: Animalia
- Phylum: Arthropoda
- Clade: Pancrustacea
- Class: Insecta
- Order: Neuroptera
- Family: Hemerobiidae
- Genus: Micromus; Rambur, 1842

Synonyms
- Ameromicromus Nakahara, 1960; Menutus Navás, 1932; Pseudopsectra Perkins in Sharp, 1899

= Micromus =

Genus of lacewings

Micromus is a genus of lacewings in the family Hemerobiidae (the brown lacewings). These small (4–10 mm long) insects are found worldwide. Like most lacewings, both the larvae and adults are predatory, primarily eating acarines, scale insects, psyllids, aphids, thrips, and the eggs of lepidopterans and whiteflies. The species Micromus tasmaniae has been mass-bred for biological pest control in Australia.

== Species ==
There are more than 80 species in the genus, and possibly as many as 170.

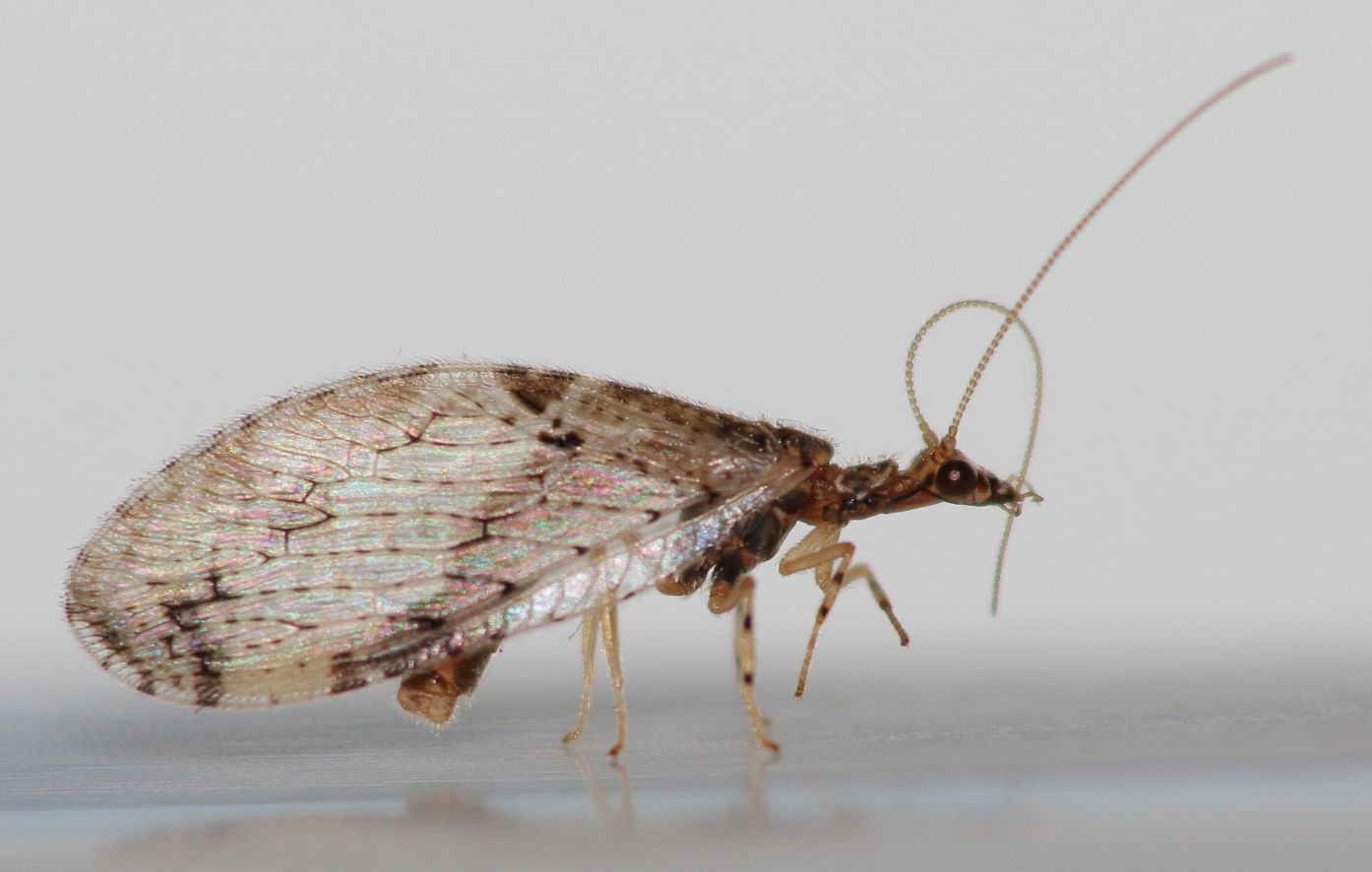
Micromus africanus

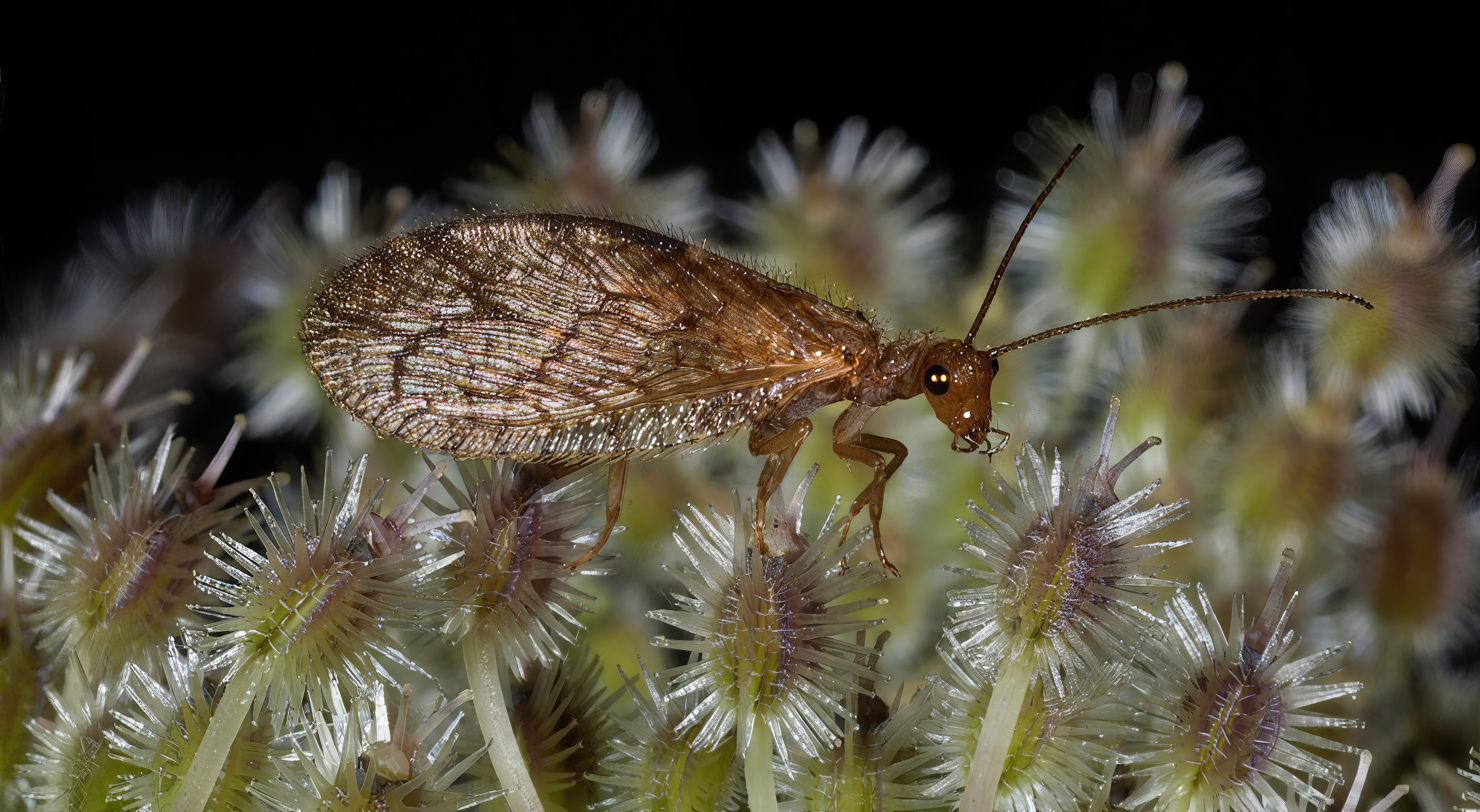
Micromus angulatus

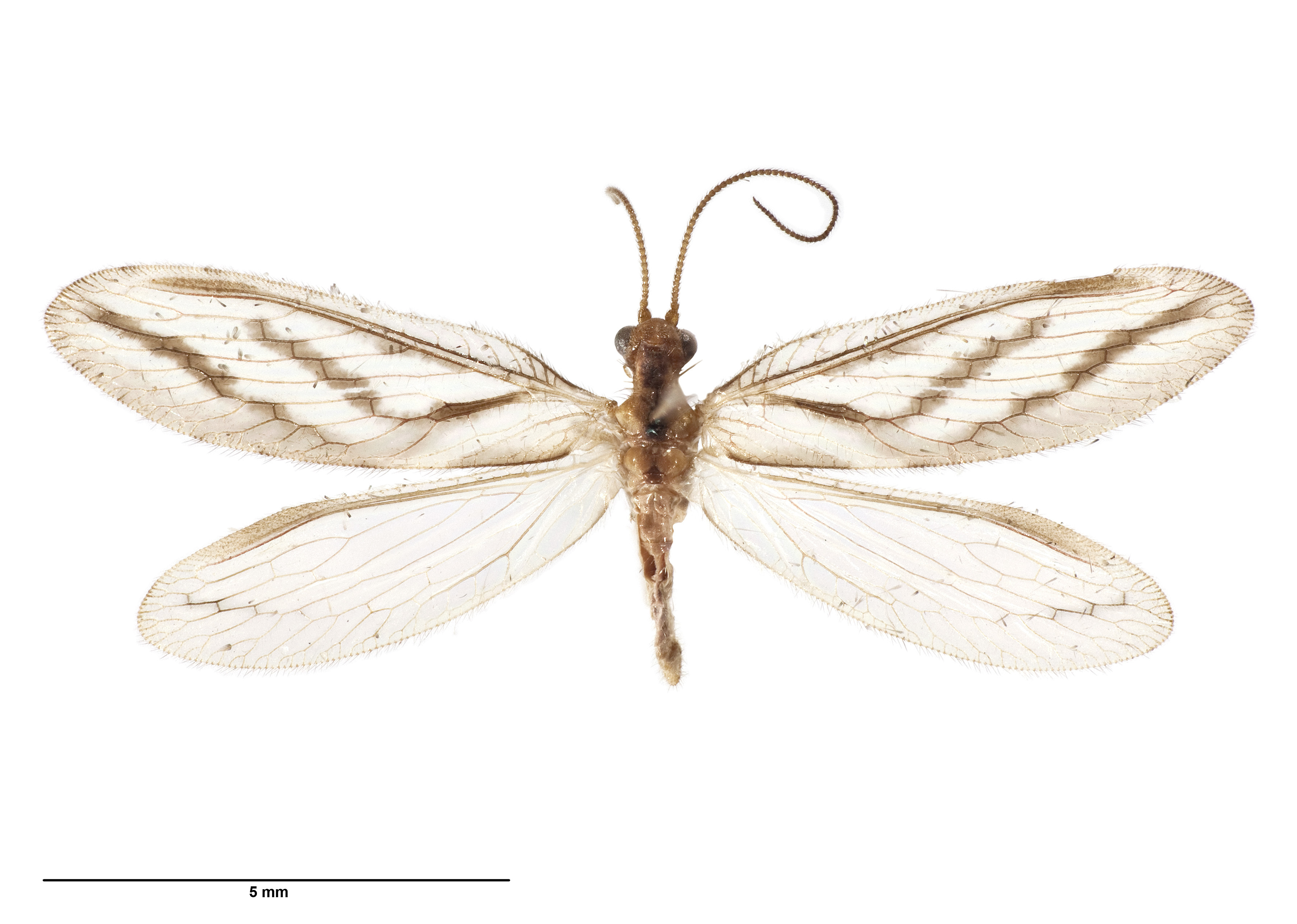
Micromus bifasciatus

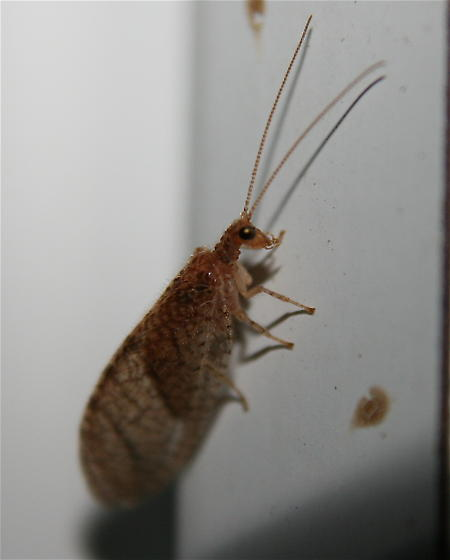
Micromus posticus

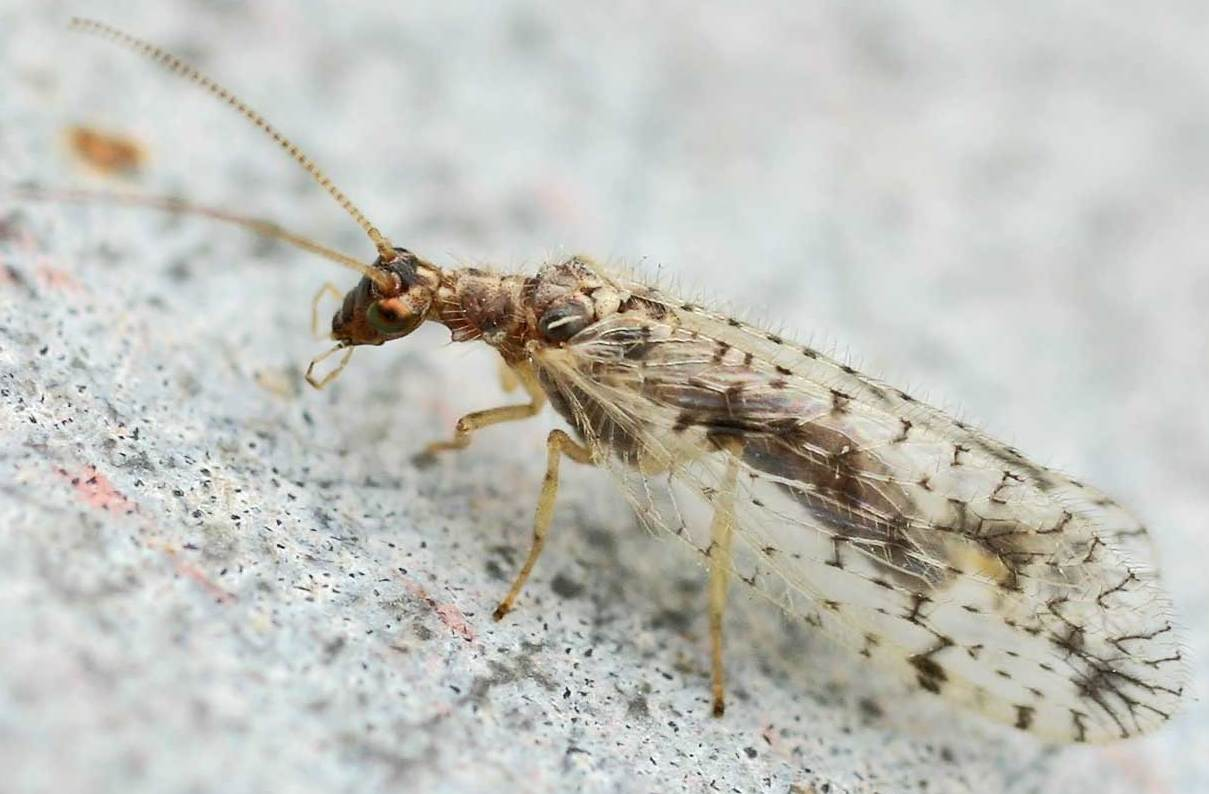
Micromus variegatus

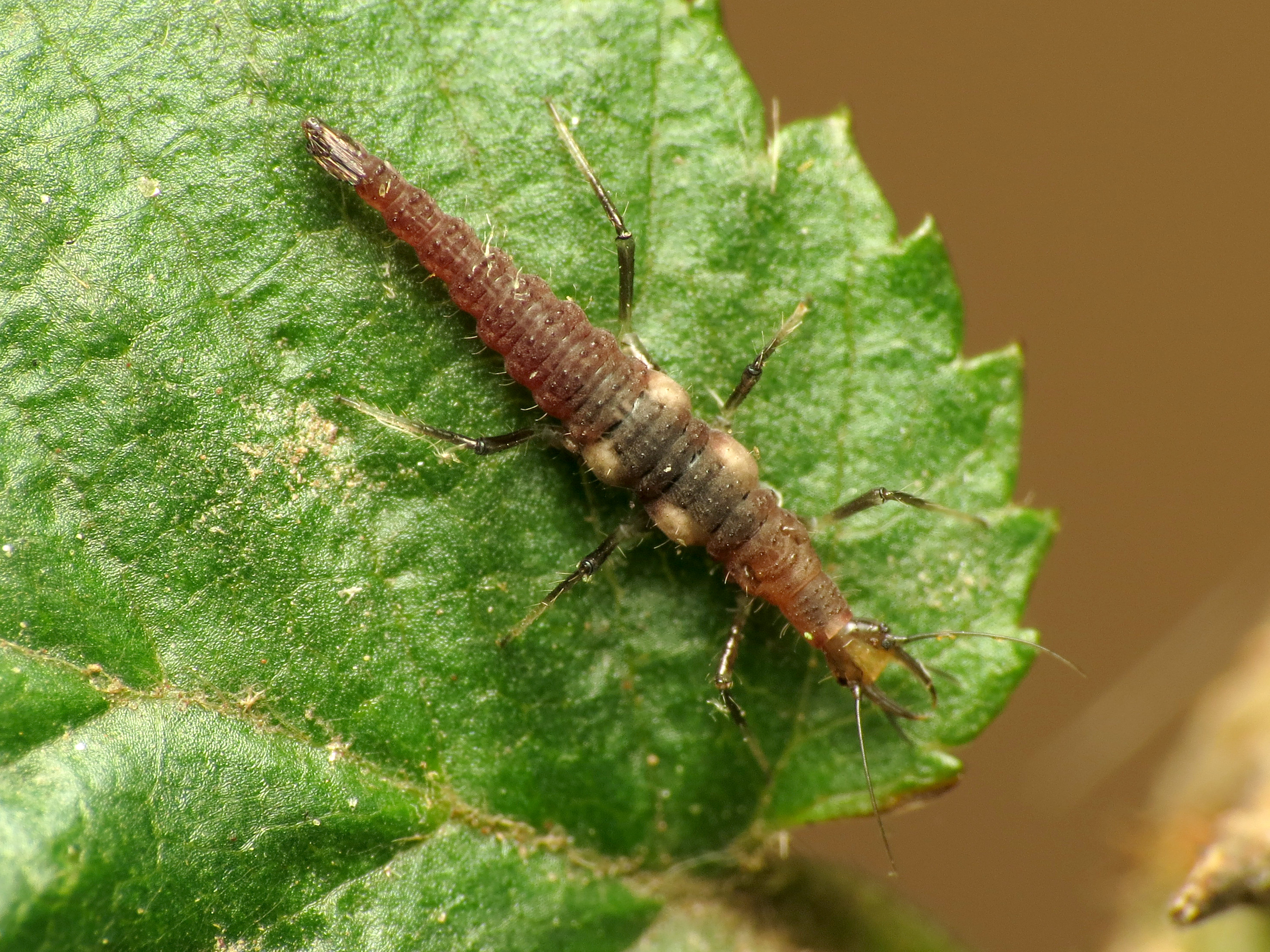
Campodeiform larva of Micromus posticus
