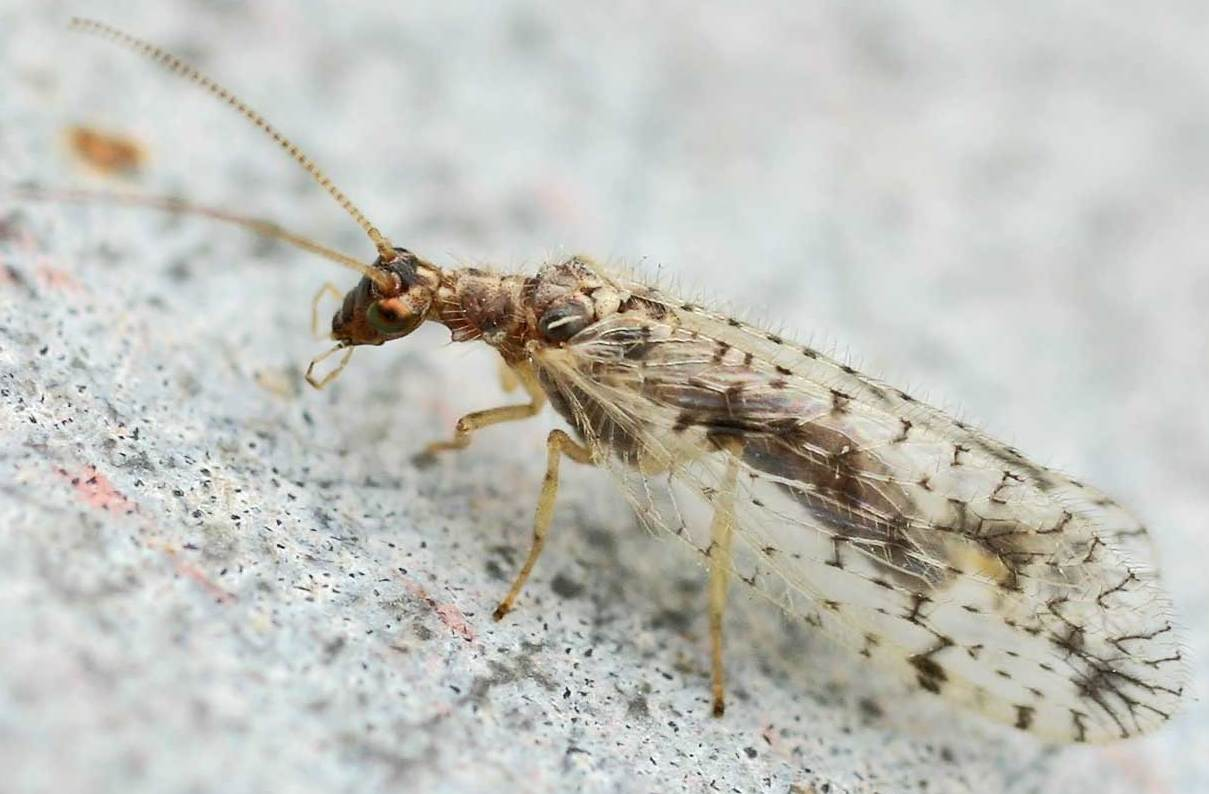
- Adult Micromus variegatus (Microminae)

Scientific classification
- Kingdom: Animalia
- Phylum: Arthropoda
- Class: Insecta
- Order: Neuroptera
- Suborder: Hemerobiiformia
- Superfamily: Hemerobioidea
- Family: Hemerobiidae; Latreille, 1802

Subfamilies
- 10, see text

Synonyms
- Promegalomidae

= Hemerobiidae =

Hemerobiidae Temporal range: Jurassic–Recent

Family of insects

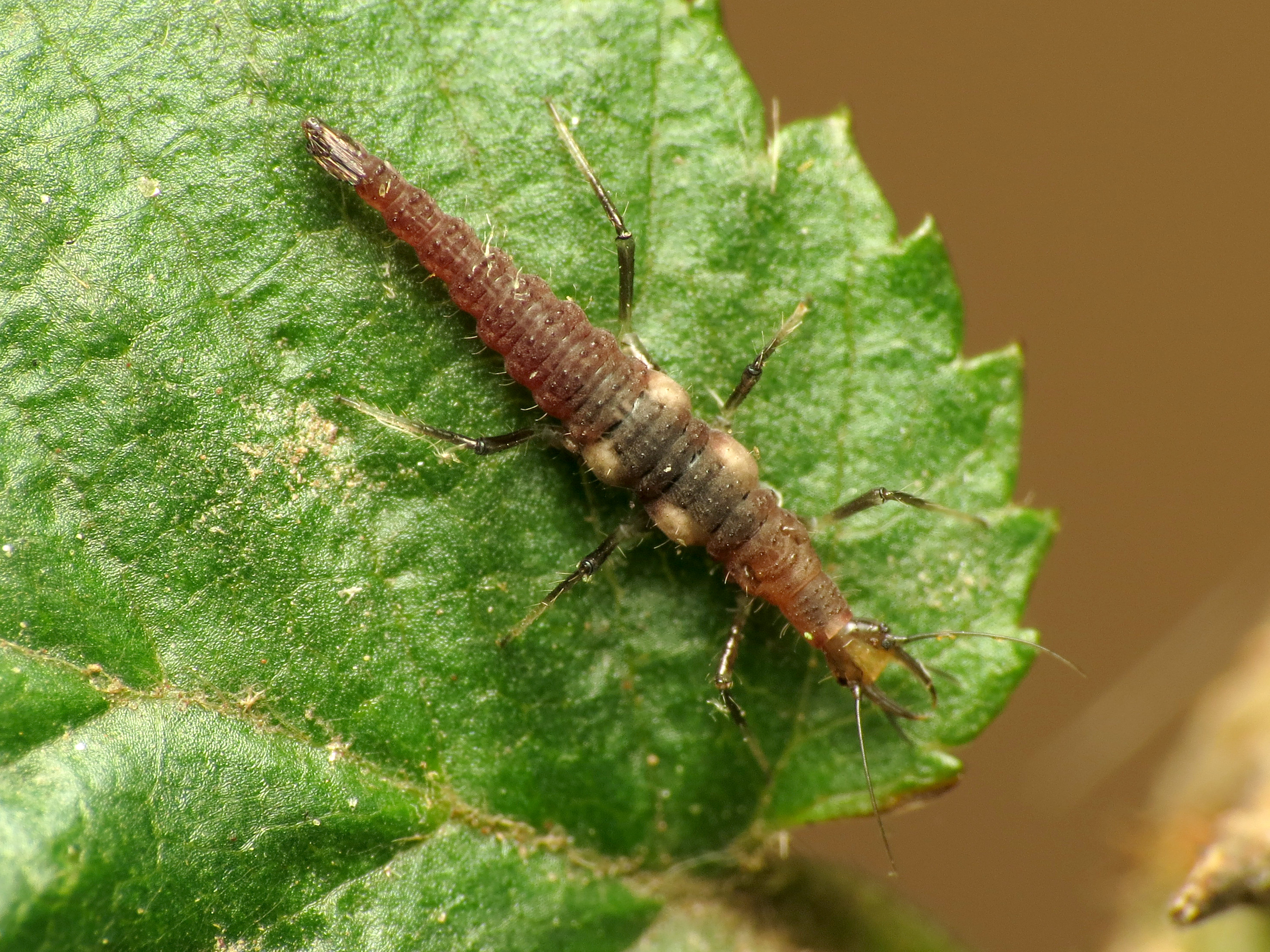
Campodeiform larva of Micromus

Hemerobiidae is a family of Neuropteran insects commonly known as brown lacewings, comprising about 500 species in 28 genera. Most are yellow to dark brown, but some species are green. They are small; most have forewings 4–10 mm long (some up to 18 mm). These insects differ from the somewhat similar Chrysopidae (green lacewings) not only by the usual coloring but also by the wing venation: hemerobiids differ from chrysopids in having numerous long veins (two or more radial sectors) and forked costal cross veins. Some genera (Hemerobius, Micromus, Notiobiella, Sympherobius, Wesmaelius) are widespread, but most are restricted to a single biogeographical realm. Some species have reduced wings to the degree that they are flightless. Imagines (adults) of subfamily Drepanepteryginae mimic dead leaves. Hemerobiid larvae are usually less hairy than chrysopid larvae.

Hemerobiids, like chrysopids, are predatory, especially on aphids, both as larvae and adults. The species Micromus tasmaniae is bred for biological pest control.

== Systematics ==
The relationships between the Hemerobiidae and the other Neuropteran families are still unresolved. Despite their superficial similarity to chrysopids, the brown and green lacewings may not be as closely related as was at one time believed. Rather, the Hemerobiidae appear to be closely related to the Mantispidae.

The superfamily Hemerobioidea is currently restricted to the Hemerobiidae. Formerly, the pleasing lacewings (Dilaridae), silky lacewings (Psychopsidae), giant lacewings (Polystoechotidae) and as noted above the green lacewings (Chrysopidae) were placed therein too. Of these, only the Dilaridae and Chrysopidae seem to be reasonably close relatives of the brown lacewings. The Psychopsidae in fact seem to belong to an altogether different suborder of Neuroptera, the Myrmeleontiformia.

=== Phylogeny ===
Cladogram of Hemerobiidae relations, based on morphological and molecular data. Psychobiellinae was rearranged into Notiobiellinae and Zachobiellinae, and Adelphohemerobiinae was placed as incertae sedis.

- Hemerobiidae
  - - Drepanepteryginae
    - Microminae
  - - Sympherobiinae
    - - Zachobiellinae
      - - Megalominae
        - Carobinae
  - - Hemerobiinae
    - - Drepanacrinae
      - Notiobiellinae

=== Genera ===
The subfamilies of Hemerobiidae are:

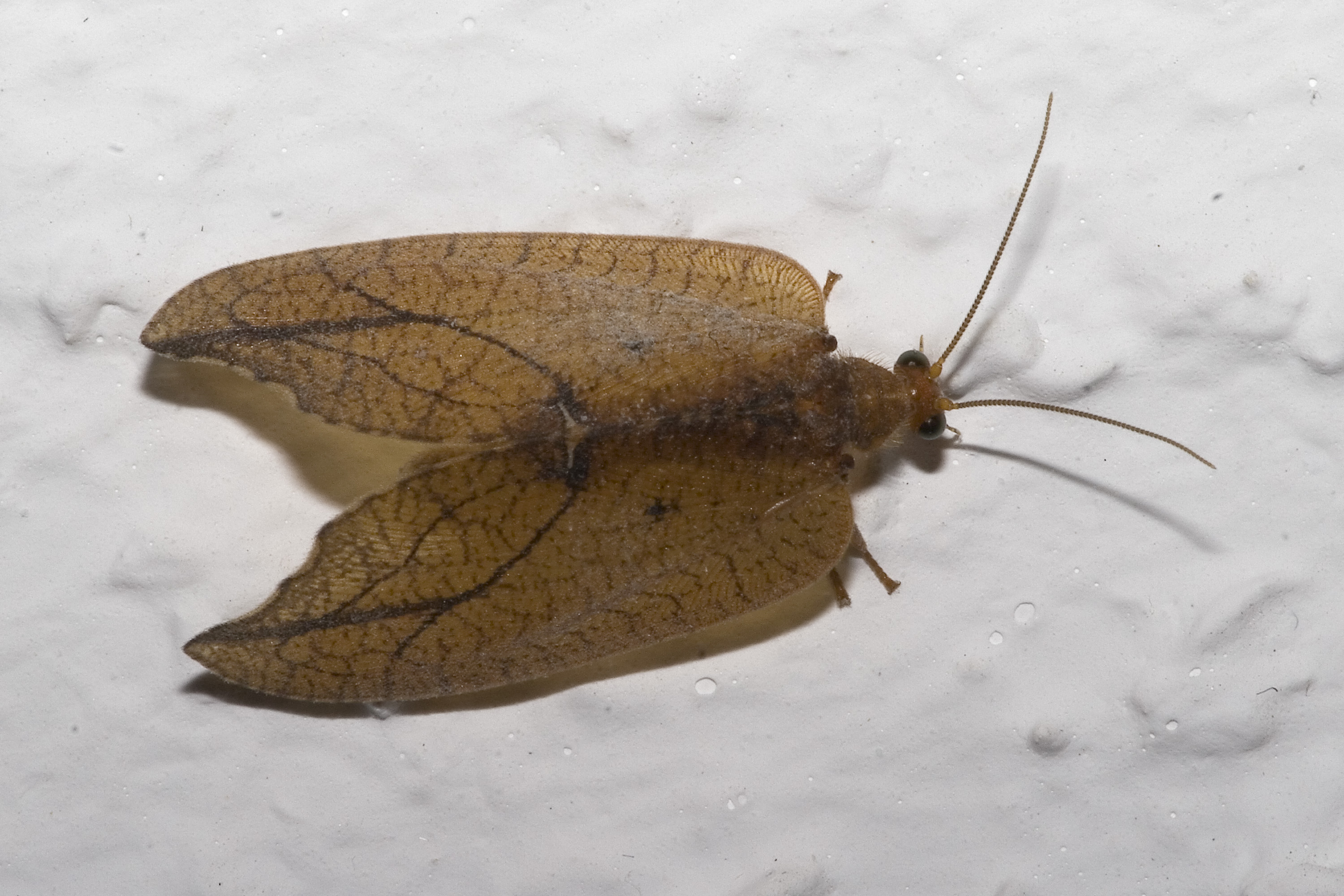
Drepanepteryx phalaenoides adult (Drepanepteryginae)

Courtship of Micromus variegatus (Microminae)

- Subfamily Drepanacrinae
  - Genus Austromegalomus
  - Genus Conchopterella
  - Genus Drepanacra
  - Genus Psychobiella
- Subfamily Carobiinae
  - Genus Carobius
- Subfamily Drepanepteryginae
  - Genus Drepanepteryx Leach, 1815
  - Genus Gayomyia
  - Genus Neuronema
- Subfamily Hemerobiinae
  - Genus Biramus
  - Genus Hemerobiella
  - Genus Hemerobius Linnaeus, 1758
  - Genus Nesobiella
  - Genus Wesmaelius Krüger, 1922
- Subfamily Megalominae
  - Genus Megalomus Rambur, 1842
- Subfamily Microminae
  - Genus Megalomina Banks, 1909
  - Genus Micromus Rambur, 1842
  - Genus Nusalala Navás, 1913
- Subfamily Notiobiellinae
  - Genus Notiobiella
- Subfamily Sympherobiinae
  - Genus Neosympherobius
  - Genus Nesobiella
  - Genus Sympherobius Banks, 1904
- Subfamily Zachobiellinae
  - Genus Anapsectra
  - Genus Psectra Hagen, 1866
  - Genus Zachobiella
- Subfamily incertae sedis
  - Genus Adelphohemerobius Oswald, 1993
  - Genus Notherobius - uncertain or fairly basal position

=== Fossils ===
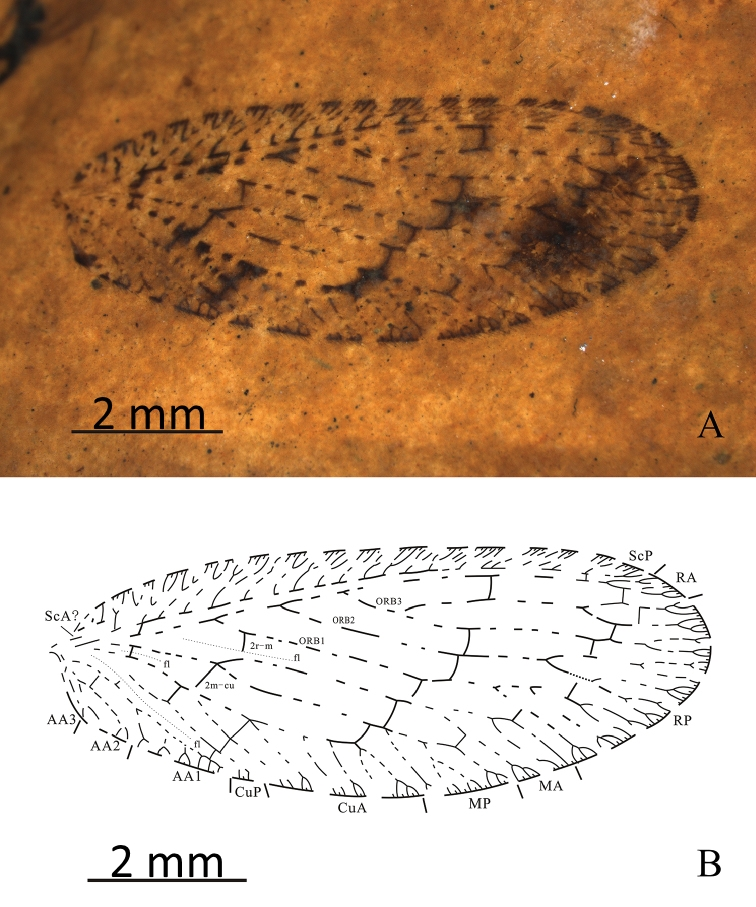
Wesmaelius makarkini from Lower Miocene China. A photograph of forewing under alcohol B Line drawing of forewing.

Numerous fossil Hemerobiidae have been described, some from the still-living genera, others from genera that are entirely extinct today. While most have been found in Eocene to Miocene rocks or amber, Promegalomus is known from the Jurassic. It was formerly considered to constitute a distinct family Promegalomidae, but is currently recognized as a very basal member of the Hemerobiidae. The Cretaceous Mesohemerobius was formerly considered a brown lacewing, but is today rather placed as incertae sedis in the Neuroptera; it might be a member of the Hemerobioidea but not even that is certain. Notable fossil Hemerobiidae genera are:

- Bothromicromus Scudder, 1878 (Eocene/Oligocene; Quesnel, British Columbia)
- Brasilopsychopsis Crato Formation Brazil, Early Cretaceous (Aptian)
- Cratopsychopsis Crato Formation Brazil, Aptian
- Cretomerobius Ponomarenko, 1992 Dzun-Bain Formation, Mongolia, Aptian
- Hemeroberotha Makarkin & Gröhn, 2020 Burmese amber, Myanmar, Late Cretaceous (Cenomanian)
- Mucropalpus Pictet, 1856 (Eocene; Baltic amber)
- Plesiorobius Klimaszewski and Kevan 1986 Late Cretaceous (Taimyr amber, Russia, Santonian Canadian amber, Campanian Ola Formation, Russia, Campanian)
- Prochlanius Kruger, 1923 (Eocene; Baltic amber)
- Promegalomus Panfilov, 1980 Karabastau Formation, Kazakhstan, Middle/Late Jurassic (Callovian/Oxfordian)
- Prophlebonema Kruger, 1923 (Eocene; Baltic amber)
- Prospadobius Kruger, 1923 (Eocene; Baltic amber)
- Purbemerobius Jepson et al. 2012 Durlston Formation, United Kingdom, Early Cretaceous (Berriasian)

The extinct genus Hemerobites was originally described in 1813 from a specimen preserved in Baltic amber as a hemerobiid. However further study has resulted in its synonymy with the genus Eutermes and placement in the termite subfamily Termitina. The species Wesmaelius mathewesi, was described in 2003 from a solitary Eocene fossil found near Quesnel, British Columbia, and placed into the extant genus Wesmaelius. At that time it was the oldest Hemerobiinae species described. Another species from the same genus, Wesmaelius makarkini was found in Garang Formation of Zeku County, Qinghai Province, China, in 2018. The finding is from Lower Miocene.

Some additional brown lacewing larvae have been found as fossils, but it has been impossible to determine their generic or subfamilial association.
