= 2025 United Kingdom wildfires =

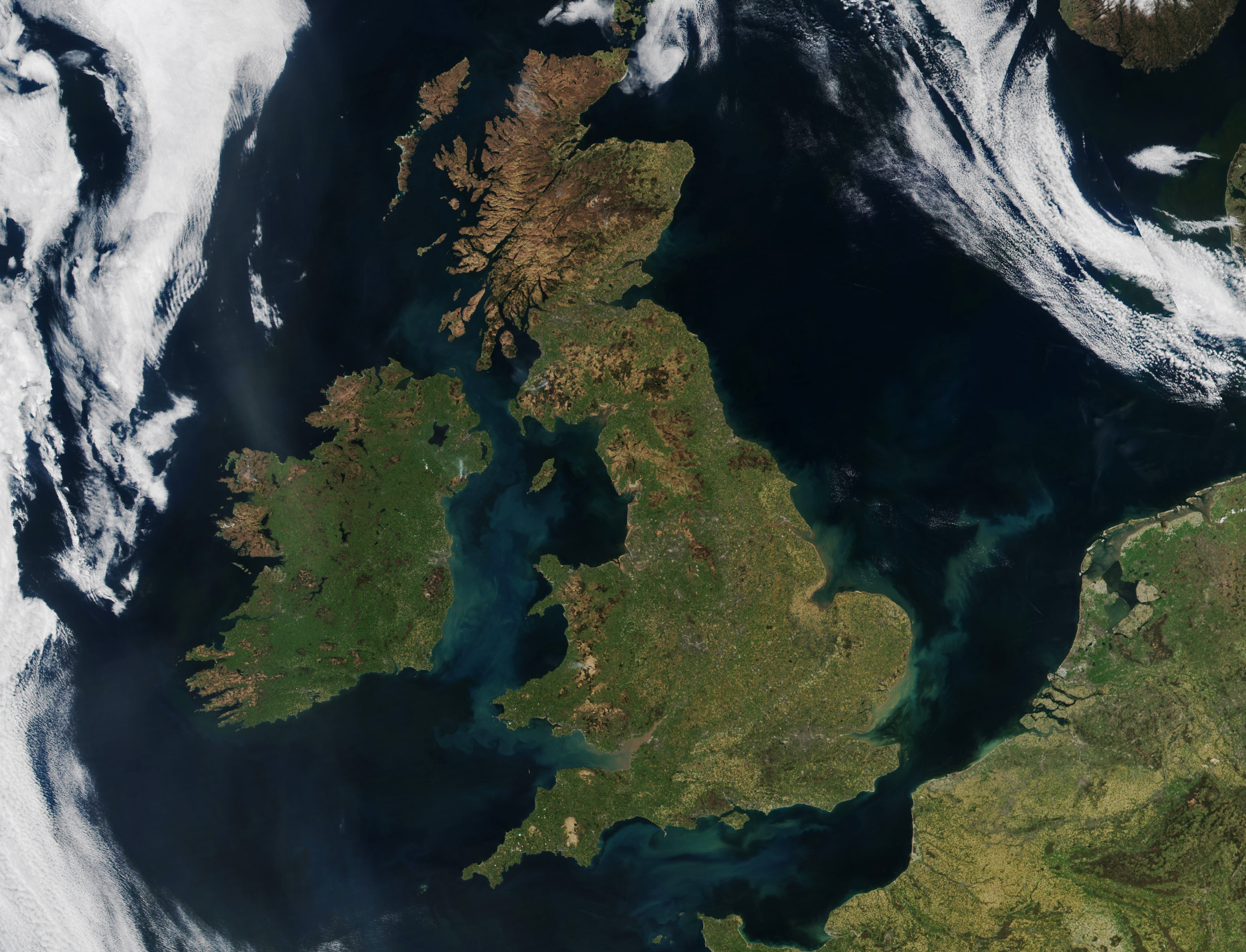
- A satellite image of the British Isles taken on 7 April: smoke can be seen from wildfires in the Mourne Mountains, the Elenydd, Galloway Forest Park and the Northwest Highlands.

Statistics
- Total fires: 181 (30 ha (74 acres) or larger)
- Total area: 47,879 ha (118,310 acres; 478.79 km^{2}; 184.86 sq mi)

Impacts
- Injuries: 1+
- Evacuated: >50

Map
- Map of 2025 United Kingdom wildfires (map data)

2025 was the United Kingdom's worst year for wildfires on record, with the highest area of land affected by them since records began in 2012. Over 47,879 ha (118,310 acres; 184.86 sq mi; 478.79 km^{2}) was burnt, surpassing the previous annual record set in 2019 by more than 19,000 ha (47,000 acres); it also recorded the highest number of fires larger than 30 ha (74 acres) at 181, an increase of 30 from the previous record set in 2022. The largest wildfire from the outbreak was Dava wildfire, occurring in the Scottish Highlands.

== Overview ==
The European Forest Fire Information System (EFFIS) keeps records of wildfires in Europe and has maintained a database since 2004. By April, 2025 had seen the highest area in the United Kingdom burned by wildfires, reaching 47,879 ha (118,310 acres; 184.86 sq mi; 478.79 km^{2}) by the end of the year. The previous record was set in 2019, when a total area of 28,754 ha (71,050 acres; 111.02 sq mi; 287.54 km^{2}) was burned throughout the year. This year also saw the highest number of fires, with EFFIS mapping 181 fires greater than 30 ha (74 acres); the previous record was 151, set in 2022. During the seven days from 2–8 April alone, 18,257 ha (45,110 acres; 70.49 sq mi; 182.57 km^{2}) was burned by 31 fires across the country, the highest 7-day total on record.

== March ==
=== England ===
On 10 March, a fire started deliberately at Canford Heath affected two areas of heathland, measuring 9.6 ha (24 acres) in total. On 17 March, a fire at RSPB Arne spread to 12 ha (30 acres). On 19 March, a grassfire started on Rafland Common, west of Shap, covering about 3 ha (7.4 acres).

On 21 March, a fire at Howden Moor in the Peak District caused £30,000 of damage after burning 1 sq mi (640 acres; 260 ha; 2.6 km^{2}). South Yorkshire Fire and Rescue Service brought the blaze under control in 12 hours with support from Derbyshire Fire and Rescue Service. Another fire began at around 1:30 p.m. on the same day on Marsden Moor; it covered an area of around 18 sq mi (12,000 acres; 4,700 ha; 47 km^{2}).

=== Northern Ireland ===
On 17 March at 6:42 p.m. a fire began in near Castlewellan in the Mourne Mountains; it was attended by seven appliances and 60 firefighters and is believed to have been started deliberately.

=== Scotland ===
At 2:15 p.m. on 20 March, a fire started near Bowling in the Kilpatrick Hills; it was attended by four fire engines and was extinguished early the following day. On 21 March, six fire engines and a water tanker were sent to a fire between Culduthel and Inverarnie, close to Inverness; the B861 road was closed in both directions and a bus service had to be diverted.

=== Wales ===
On 16 March, a grass fire began at 12:37 p.m. in the Thornhill area of Cwmbran; it was extinguished at 2:11 p.m. after spreading to around 1.5 ha (3.7 acres). A fire involving around 1 ha (2.5 acres) of gorse began at around 6:30 p.m. at Blaenau Ffestiniog; the fire service said it was under control by 00:30 a.m. At 8:18 p.m. a wildfire began and went on to burn large areas of moorland between Bronaber and Trawsfynydd, with a fire front of 500 m (1,600 ft) being reported at midnight on 17 March.

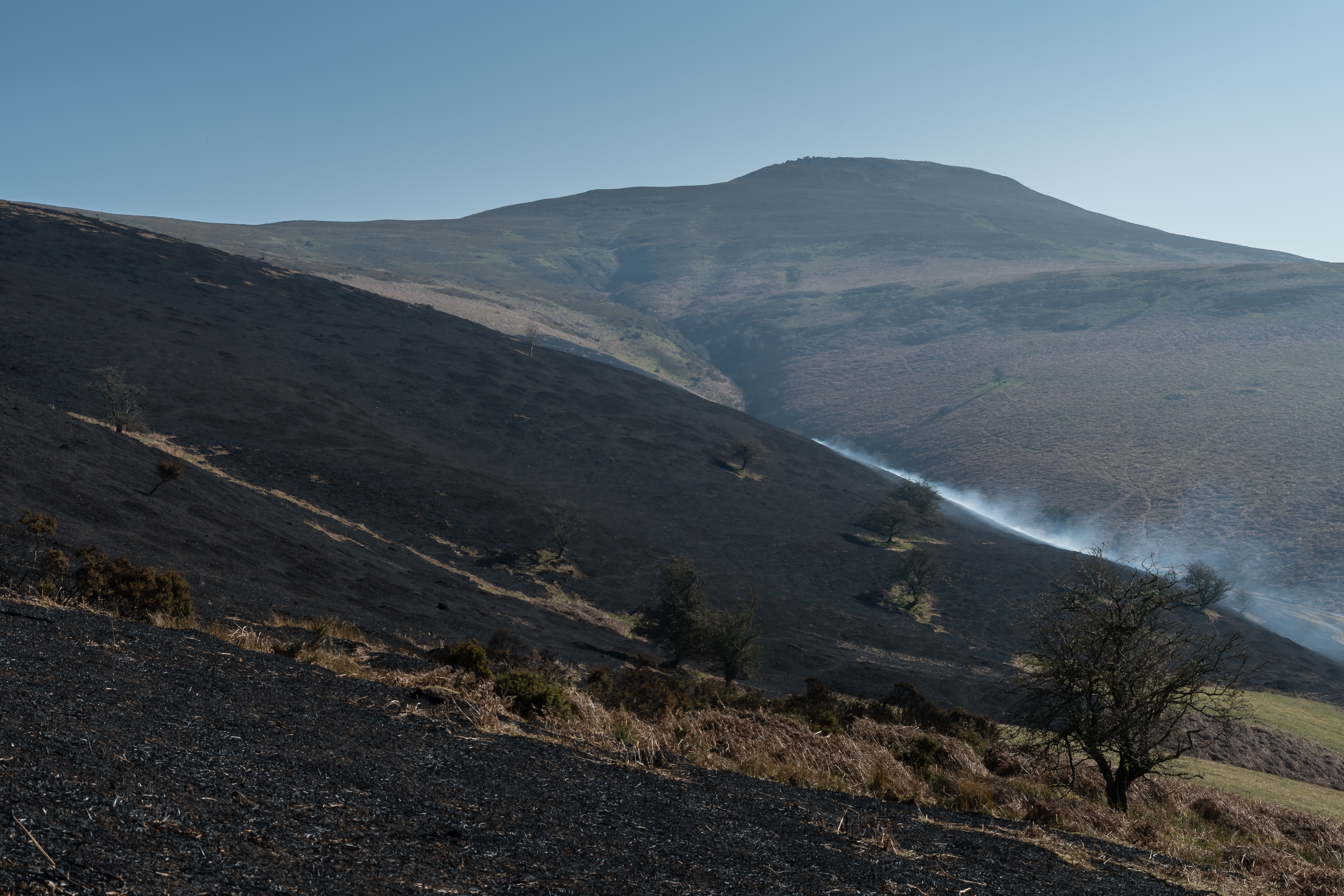
Burnt land on the Sugar Loaf.

On 18 March, a wildfire began in Caerphilly at 3:22 p.m. and spread to cover 3 ha (7.4 acres) before it was extinguished at 6:53 p.m. On 20 March at 9:36 a.m. fire crews were called to a large fire near Carrog. It was extinguished at 11:02 a.m. on 22 March after affecting over 2,000 acres (810 ha) of land. One resident in Treorchy captured a video of flames getting close to their home after a wildfire started in the nearby mountains on 21 March. A small wildfire broke out in Blackwood, Caerphilly, on 30 March; it started at around 4 p.m. and was extinguished by 6:15 p.m. On 31 March, a fire on the Sugar Loaf, a hill near Abergavenny, burned for many hours before it was extinguished at 10:24 a.m. the following day.

== April ==
Early April saw many fires as a result of prolonged dry and sunny conditions throughout March. The seven days from 2–8 April saw over 18,000 ha (44,000 acres) burned: the highest weekly total on record. A fire which began in the Galloway Forest Park in south-west Scotland burnt an estimated 65 km^{2} (25 sq mi), whilst another east of Ystrad Fflur in mid-Wales burnt roughly 50 km^{2} (19 sq mi). At the start of April, numerous fire brigades warned of a high wildfire risk, with the Met Office issuing an amber wildfires warning following the sunniest March in England since records began in 1910. The Scottish Fire and Rescue Service (SFRS) issued a "very high" to "extreme" wildfire warning from 2–7 April; this as followed by an "extreme" warning from 11–12 April.

=== England ===
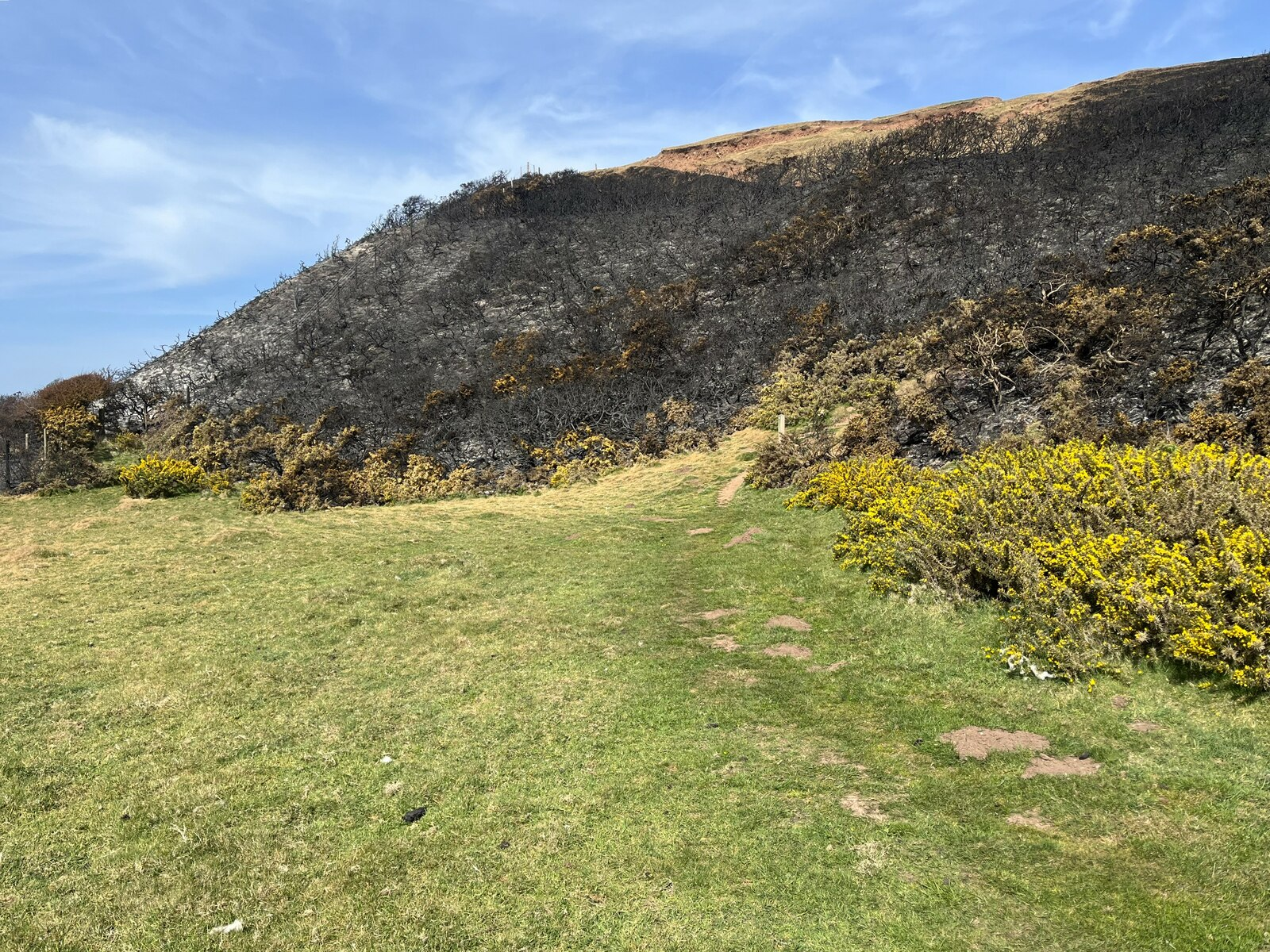
Burnt gorse near St Bees, seen on 11 April.

On 3 April, Dorset and Wiltshire Fire and Rescue Service (DWFRS) were called to two fires: one which burnt 126 acres (51 ha) at Upton Heath and one at Canford Heath which burnt 6 acres (2.4 ha). On 4 April, a grass fire in Bostall Woods in south-east London was attended by 25 firefighters. A fire started on Gentleshaw Common at 8 p.m. and spread to 3 acres (1.2 ha), with six fire engines attending it; a wildlife trust said that many animals, including bees, birds, mammals and reptiles were killed in the blaze, and the fire service said the fire was started deliberately. On 5 April, multiple fires broke out across Cumbria, mostly along the coast near Nethertown, St Bees and Walney. On that weekend, Cumbria Fire and Rescue Service attended over 40 blazes, many of which close to the Cumbrian Coast Line which delayed rail services between Whitehaven and Sellafield; Network Rail said that signalling cables were damaged, with over 2,000 m (6,600 ft) of cable having to be replaced. They added that they were investigating whether some of the fires were caused by a passing steam train. The same weekend saw a number of fires on Bodmin Moor, namely near Blisland, Bolventor, Millpool and Temple. On 6 April, four appliances took five hours to extinguish a fire in Bestwood Country Park. On 8 April, a large fire began on Beeley Moor, with about 40 firefighters attending the blaze. On 9 April, Rimrose Valley saw its ninth wildfire within four weeks.

On 10 April, a large fire began on Marsden Moor at around 5 p.m. near March Haigh Reservoir, with six fire engines and five wildlife support units attending by 8 p.m. On 12 April, over 30 firefighters spent around 6 hours fighting a 2 ha (4.9 acres) fire beside the A30 road near Blackwater. Between 9:45 a.m. on 12 April and 11 p.m. on 13 April, Cleveland Fire Brigade fought nine fires at Eston Hills. A large fire broke out at 2 p.m. on 14 April spanning 12 ha (30 acres) in Holmfirth; it forced the temporary closure of the A635 road before the 12 fire crews attending it were stood down at 5:45 p.m. A wildfire began at Studland on 17 April at around 2:30 p.m. and stranded people as the road to the Sandbanks Ferry was closed.

On 20 April, a fire broke out at around 3 p.m. beside a railway line near Goathland; it spread to burn around 100 acres (40 ha) of moorland and the railway line was closed for two days. At 7:10 p.m. on 25 April, County Durham and Darlington Fire and Rescue Service (CDDFRS) were called to a blaze at Easington Colliery, believed to have been started deliberately; two engines were at the scene for six hours tackling the blaze. On 30 April, a large wildfire began at 11:42 a.m. in the Upper Goyt Valley, close to the Cat and Fiddle Inn in Derbyshire. Ten fire engines attended the blaze, with eight crews and a helicopter returning the following day as it reached a size of 232 ha (570 acres). The Derbyshire Fire and Rescue Service said the blaze had caused "devastation" to the wildlife, with many dead animals including mammals and birds; crews finally left the scene on 6 May after over 100 firefighters attended the incident.

=== Northern Ireland ===
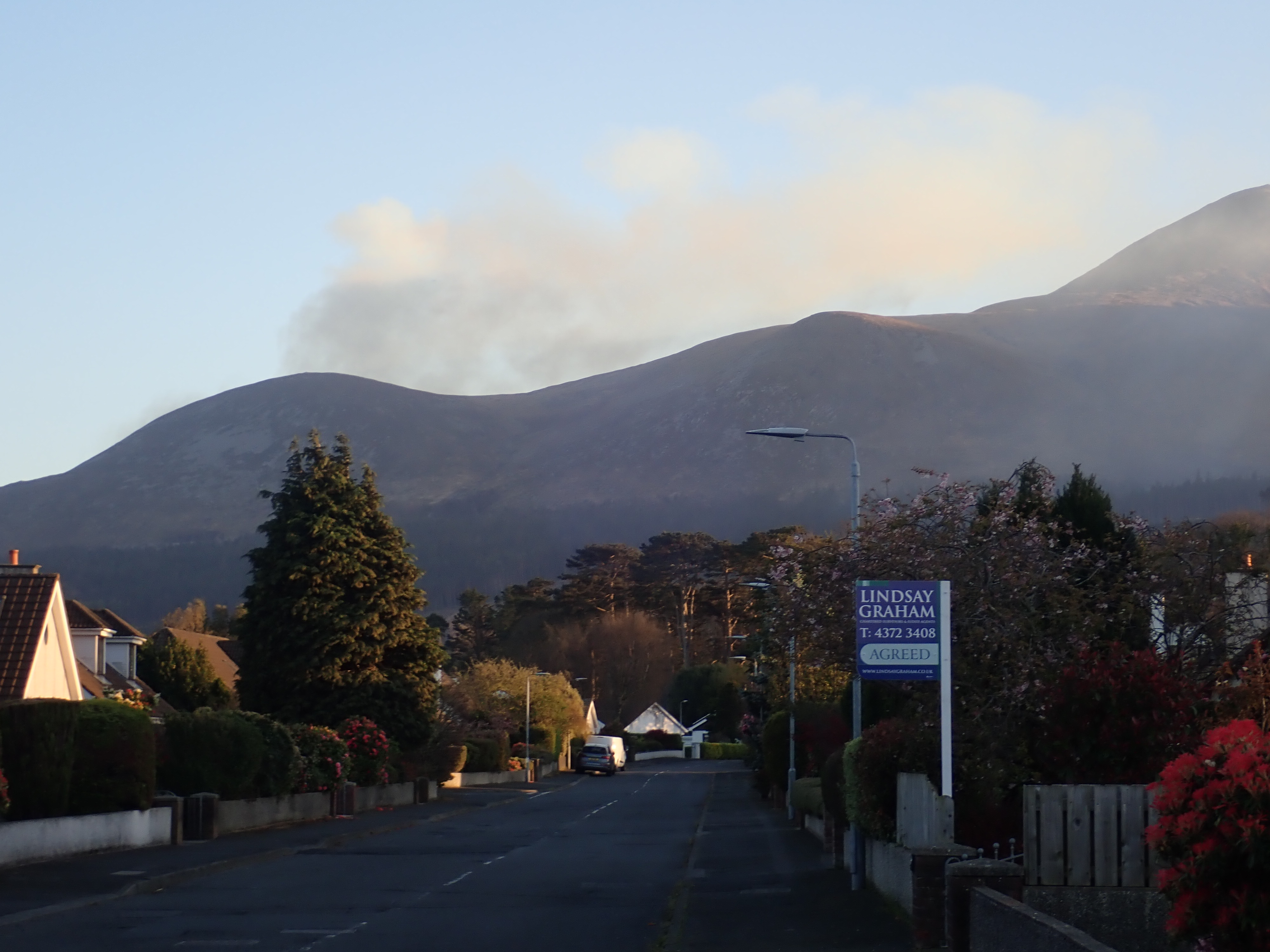
Smoke from a fire in the Mourne Mountains on 6 April.

A major incident was declared on 5 April after a large wildfire started in County Down, near the Mourne Mountains. Over 100 firefighters and 14 appliances attended the blaze, which the Northern Ireland Fire and Rescue Service (NIFRS) said stretched for around 2 mi (3.2 km) near Hilltown. NIFRS Group Commander Ross Toland said that a small number of nearby residents had been asked to leave their homes overnight. On 6 April, three additional fires began in the Mournes at Ben Crom, Silent Valley and Slieve Bearnagh; the latter was contained two days later after more than 75 firefighters attended the 1 mi (1.6 km) long blaze. In May, the Mourne Heritage Trust estimated that the fire at Silent Valley spread over 1,500–1,700 acres (610–690 ha) of land.

On 7 April, a fire at Sawel Mountain which was started deliberately was attended by up to 40 firefighters. On 8 April, a fire on Divis and Black Mountain was extinguished after being attended by 26 firefighters. A gorse fire began north of Ballygawley in County Tyrone, which was attended by 29 fire appliances as it threatened properties. On 9 April two gorse fires were reported: one in Fintona at 4:50 p.m. which was attended by five fire appliances and 38 firefighters; and one in Cargan at 5:23 p.m. which was attended by 41 firefighters.

On 10 April, a fire at Brookeborough was attended by 33 firefighters, whilst a blaze outside Draperstown which was started deliberately was attended by 54 firefighters. In total, the NIFRS attended 296 wildfires between 3 and 10 April 147 of which were in the Mournes. A large fire near Glenshane Pass was extinguished at 11 p.m. on 11 April after it was attended by 10 appliances and 75 firefighters.

=== Scotland ===
On 1 April, a large fire began in the Kilpatrick Hills near Glasgow and another was started deliberately in Banchory.

The SFRS were called to the Galloway Forest Park at 4:14 p.m. on 3 April where a fire had started near Glen Trool; by 4 April a helicopter had been brought in to drop water over the blaze. On 5 April the fire service reported they had evacuated people and properties, with five groups of walkers were evacuated from the hills the previous night. Two crews were at the scene on 6 April as helicopters continued to water bomb the area; the SFRS said the fire had moved on to Lamachan Hill, with four helicopters dropping water on the flames as the fire front was 2–3 mi (3.2–4.8 km) wide. The fire was under control by 7 April after spreading to Loch Doon. After the fire, the Galloway Mountain Rescue Team (GMRT) searched the burned area for any belongings left by evacuated persons; they found one camp untouched by the fire despite its surroundings being scorched, and found no trace of the other two camps. According to Forestry and Land Scotland Regional Manager John Dougan, the fire spread to burn over 35 sq mi (91 km^{2}), a size he compared to that of Edinburgh.

A large blaze began at around 8:55 p.m. on Tullos Hill in Aberdeen on 4 April, with four fire engines sent to the scene before leaving at 2:54 a.m. the next day. On 5 April, a large fire began in Inverpolly near Stac Pollaidh, prompting the closure of part of the A835 road between Achiltibuie and Badnagyle. It was extinguished by 7:30 p.m. two days later after being attended by six appliances. On 7 April, another fire began in a forest near Inverkip; it caused large amounts of haze on the River Clyde as smoke drifted over Greenock, prompting ships to use their foghorns as visibility was low. At around midday on 8 April a fire started in the Glendale area on the Isle of Skye. It grew to 1 mi (1.6 km) long and was extinguished the next day after being attended by four fire engines.

On 10 April, grassfire started at 1 p.m. in Glen Rosa on the Isle of Arran; it was extinguished three days later after destroying 27,000 trees and killing hundreds of reptiles. Two fires were attended by four crews each, one in Thurso and another on the Pentland Hills near Edinburgh. A fire at Fannyside Loch near Cumbernauld was attended by eight fire engines; it forced the evacuation of many properties, including an animal shelter. A fire started on an area of dunes and grass near the St Fergus Gas Terminal at around 1 p.m. on 11 April, with five fire engines and a specialist wildfire unit in attendance.

=== Wales ===
On 1 April, numerous wildfires broke out across Wales, mostly in the south of the country. A fire in Crosskeys spread to 20 ha (49 acres) and was extinguished at 10:03 a.m. on 2 April, whilst a fire in Abertillery started at 7:17 p.m. and was extinguished at 6:03 a.m. on 2 April. A fire in Garnlydan (near Beaufort, Blaenau Gwent) began at 10:12 p.m. and was extinguished at 1:19 a.m. after burning 25 ha (62 acres). A fire in Brynberian spread quickly amid 25 mph (40 km/h) winds, with five fire crews at the scene on 2 April. Other fires during the first week of April included those at Cefn Rhigos, Clydach Vale, Garndolbenmaen, Harlech, Hirwaun, Llanllwni, Nebo and Whitland.

The Mid and West Wales Fire and Rescue Service (MAWWFRS) were called to two large fires in the Elenydd on 6 April: one to the east of Cwm Rheidol and another in the area between the Claerwen reservoir and Ystrad Fflur. On 8 April the MAWWFRS station commander Emyr Jones said there was a fire front roughly 5 mi (8.0 km) long at the latter fire.

== May ==
The UK saw its hottest start to May on record and the hottest day of the year so far, with temperatures reaching 29.3 °C (84.7 °F) in London. This prompted fire services to issue warnings for wildfires as the National Fire Chiefs Council (NFCC) said there had been 439 wildfires in the country since the start of the year; the same period saw 250, 60 and 44 wildfires in 2022, 2023 and 2024 respectively.

=== England ===
At 12:15 p.m. on 1 May, a large fire broke out near Ripponden and spread quickly. By 5 p.m. West Yorkshire Fire & Rescue Service (WYFRS) said there were 18 crews at the scene as the blaze burned in two directions, each with a fire front around 2 km (1.2 mi) long. Smoke from the blaze billowed across the M62 motorway as part of the A672 road was closed; the following day WYFRS said the blaze covered around 6 km^{2} (2.3 sq mi). A fire started at around 2 p.m. close to the A614 road between Market Weighton and Holme-on-Spalding Moor, with Humberside Fire and Rescue Service saying six appliances had been sent to the scene. A small fire started on a cliffside near Bournemouth Pier at 8:39 p.m. on 3 May; it spread to 1 ha (2.5 acres) before it was extinguished by around 40 firefighters by 11 p.m. On 4 May, a large fire started at around 2:30 p.m. on Dartmoor near Cut Hill; crews from 13 stations attended the blaze as it spread to 1,230 acres (500 ha; 5.0 km^{2}) before it was extinguished at around 5 p.m. the next day. A grassfire on an embankment of the South Wales Main Line caused disruption to rail services after damaging an overhead line and signalling equipment between Cardiff and Newport.

On 10 May, a fire started near Bransgore and spread to 8 ha (20 acres), with around 50 firefighters attending. Another fire started in Thetford Forest at 2:41 p.m. and spread to 6 ha (15 acres) before it was extinguished by 5:21 p.m. after five fire engines attended it. A fire near the Ovenden Moor Wind Farm, which was initially attended by nine fire engines, still had some crews at the scene four days later. On 11 May, a large fire started shortly before 8 a.m. at Chapel Common, spreading to 8 ha (20 acres) as nine fire engines attended. On 12 May, a wildfire began at Barton Mills at 4:42 a.m. and spread to 4 ha (9.9 acres), with eight fire crews and a tanker from RAF Lakenheath fighting the blaze; the fire reignited the next day and was extinguished again by six crews. Another fire started near the Peel Monument on Holcombe Moor at around midday, with three fire engines sent there. On 18 May, a fire on Belton Common was tackled by 12 crews over seven hours. A fire caused severe damage to around 3.5 acres (1.4 ha) of sand dunes on the Solway Coast, with the manager estimating it would take 20 years for the wildlife to fully recover.

On 20 May, a fire broke out at 3:30 p.m. at Strensall Common and was tackled by eight crews. A large fire began at the Salisbury Plain Training Area following a live firing exercise by the Ministry of Defence. On 31 May, four gardens in Maylandsea were destroyed after a small fire started by sunlight reflecting from a piece of glass later reignited; four fire engines extinguished the blaze before it reached any homes.

=== Northern Ireland ===
On 7 May, a fire started at 12:20 a.m. on a mountain near Donemana, with nine appliances attending before it was extinguished at 10:55 a.m. A large gorse fire started in Clogher at 12:51 p.m. close to the border with Ireland; 15 appliances and 97 personnel were at the scene on 8 May as the fire spread into County Monaghan.

=== Scotland ===
On 10 May, a wildfire began at 11:43 a.m. in a wooded area near Fauldhouse; it spread to 4 ha (9.9 acres) and was extinguished the following day after being attended by nine appliances and a helicopter. On 19 May, a large fire began in Culbin Forest and spread to 625 ha (1,540 acres; 6.25 km^{2}; 2.41 sq mi) as a helicopter dropped water on the blaze, with six appliances and over 30 firefighters at the scene. On 28 May, nine appliances attended a large wildfire near Alford with a helicopter also in use to waterbomb the flames.

=== Wales ===
On 17 May, a large grassfire broke out at 3 p.m. in a forested area of Pontycymer, with eight crews being called to the blaze and a road being closed.

== June ==
=== England ===
On 2 June, a fire began in a wooded area near Holt Country Park and caused "significant damage" to wildlife and breeding areas before it was tackled by fire crews from 13 stations.

On 26 June, a large fire believed to have been started deliberately caused significant damage to Coatham Marsh and disrupted train services. On 29 June, a fire attended by six appliances damaged areas of woodland in Brierley Forest Park. Norfolk Fire and Rescue Service said they had attended 32 fires in the open between 27 and 30 June, a period which coinciced with an amber heat alert issued by the UKHSA amid a heatwave.

=== Scotland ===
On 28 June, crews were called to a large fire at 5:50 p.m. which had started near Loch Allan and spread to surrounding areas, causing the closure of the A939, A940 and B9007 roads. Two more fires started nearby the following day: one near Forres, which had six appliances in attendance; and one near Carrbridge, which led to further road closures.

== July ==
On 1 July, a wildfire affected around 1 ha (2.5 acres) of heathland on Turbary Common; police said it was believed to have been started deliberately. On 2 July, a fire near the railway at Corfe Castle damaged a large area of bushes, trees and undergrowth. On 3 July, a large grass fire on Croft Hill, which was caused by a disposable barbecue, was attended by three appliances, whilst a fire near Minsterley spread to 10 ha (25 acres) and took fire crews from five stations four hours to extinguish. A fire which was started deliberately at Holton Heath was extinguished two days later after being fought by 40 firefighters with 18 appliances, 10 support vehicles and two Unimogs. On 7 July, a 19-year-old man was airlifted to hospital after being seriously injured during a woodland fire in Sedgley. On 9 July, six fire engines attended a large fire at a barley field in Kennford which spread to around 12 ha (30 acres).

On 11 July, a grassfire at Wanstead Flats spread to 14 acres (5.7 ha) before it was brought under control by ten fire engines and 70 firefighters. A fire on a hill close to the M90 motorway near Perth was tackled by six fire engines over two days. On 12 July, a fire which began in a garden spread to a house in Totnes, whilst a dropped cigarette began a fire which spread to three gardens in Alvaston. A major incident was declared near Bromsgrove after a fire in a field spread to 80 acres (32 ha) and forced the evacuation of 50 homes, with 12 fire engines and five tractors from local farmers being used to bring the blaze under control. A wildfire on Hankley Common spread to over 8 ha (20 acres) as it was tackled by 16 fire engines, whilst a field fire in Wollaston spread to 25 acres (10 ha) as it was tackled by six fire engines. On 13 July, a car fire on the A30 road near Temple spread to nearby moorland, prompting the closure of the eastbound carriageway. A combine harvester fire which spread to nearby fields near Dobwalls forced the temporary closure of a section of the Cornish Main Line, leading to significant travel disruption to railway services across Cornwall. On 14 July, part of the A414 road was closed after 1 ha (2.5 acres) of grass caught fire at a nature reserve in Maldon; the cost of repairing damage caused to the reserve was placed at around £100,000. A grass fire in Dagenham was tackled by over 120 firefighters and 25 fire engines as it spread to 8 ha (20 acres), forcing the evacuation of a number of homes; a separate fire in Hornchurch spread to 6 ha (15 acres) and was tackled by 60 firefighters and eight fire engines. On 15 July, a fire at Barling Airstrip spread to 37 acres (15 ha) and was tackled by six crews. On 16 July, around 6 ha (15 acres) of crops were destroyed following a field fire near Hursley. On 18 July, crews from 19 stations tackled three blazes across Essex: a 7-acre (2.8 ha) fire in Rayleigh which destroyed an outbuilding; a 37-acre (15 ha) fire in Grays; and a 74-acre (30 ha) fire in Witham. A fire in a field in Ravensden destroyed around 25 acres (10 ha) of grassland and hedgerow.

On 28 July, a field fire caused by a combine harvester in Doddinghurst affected a gas main and power lines before being brought under control by crews from eight stations, leading to a power outage which continued into the following day. On 29 July, around 200 m (660 ft) of gorse was affecting by a wildfire near Kynance Cove.

== August ==
On 3 August, a wildfire, which is believed to have been started deliberately, began between Hartland Moor and Studland and Godlingston Heath at Newton Heath and was fought by crews from 36 stations; flare-ups from this fire continued up to 6 August and at least 25 ha (62 acres) was destroyed in total. On 5 August, a wildfire destroyed around 10 ha (25 acres) of fields on Wallasea Island, leading to the temporary closure of a nature reserve. On 7 August, a bonfire got out of control and destroyed 4 acres (1.6 ha) of grassland in Bicknacre. On 9 August, a fire broke out on the Wrekin, leading to visitors being told to stay away before it was brought under control until the following day. A large fire began on Holt Heath and spread quickly, with smoke from the blaze visible from over 8 mi (13 km) away. A major incident was declared on 11 August as a number of homes were evacuated whilst over 100 firefighters attended the blaze. The fire service said they were still fighting the blaze at Newton Heath, adding that both fires are believed to have been started deliberately. On 12 August, a wildlife team found over 50 dead reptiles among the burnt remnants of the heath. Fire crews left the scene on 15 August after the fire destroyed around 72 ha (180 acres).

On 10 August, a wildfire broke out on Arthur's Seat and forced the closure of a large part of Holyrood Park as it rapidly spread across the hill, with four appliances at the scene. On 11 August, two fires started in Thetford Forest near the A11 and B1107 roads and were quickly brought under control by seven fire engines. A large fire started near RAF Fylingdales and spread rapidly, forcing the suspension of steam trains on the North Yorkshire Moors Railway. On 13 August, the fire service declared a major incident as it spread to over 5 km^{2} (1.9 sq mi), with over 100 firefighters and 20 appliances working to bring the fire under control. By 16 August, smoke from the fire was visible over 80 mi (130 km) away as six fire engines remained at the scene whilst a helicopter dropped water on the blaze. On 12 August, around 280 properties in Whissendine were left without power after two separate field fires damaged power lines. Firefighters in London fought two large blazes in Northolt and Wanstead Flats, with 60 and 70 firefighters in attendance as they burned around 3 ha (7.4 acres) and 4 ha (9.9 acres) respectively. Four fire engines tackled a blaze in a field in Hennock which spread to over 2 ha (4.9 acres). A fire in Woodside spread to 2 ha (4.9 acres) as it was fought by four fire engines. On 13 August, eight crews tackled a blaze in central Sheffield, with nearby residents advised to keep doors and windows closed. On 14 August, two fires started in Thorpe St Andrew, the larger of which covered 4 ha (9.9 acres). A fire in Cannock Chase was tackled by eight fire engines. A fire in Claverley spread to 2 ha (4.9 acres) as it was fought by 13 fire crews. On 15 August, a fire started near Birmingham Airport and was tackled by around 30 firefighters. A fire on Blackheath Common spread to 5 ha (12 acres) and was fought by two engines. On 17 August, a car fire on the A338 road in Bournemouth spread to nearby heathland, forcing the road to close as eight fire crews fought the blaze.

On 21 August, a fire caused by two disposable barbecues near The Dower House in Bristol caused significant damage to Stoke Park. On 24 August, a fire on a hill in Pulverbatch was tackled by 12 crews as it spread to 20 ha (49 acres); a woodland blaze near Shrewsbury was tackled by seven crews. In Poole, a fire grew to over 14 acres (5.7 ha) and was tackled by 15 fire engines as it spread close to homes. Ten appliances attended large wildfire at a farm near Monk's Gate. On 25 August, 4 ha (9.9 acres) of scrubland was destroyed during a fire near Reading. As the fire on Langdale Moor entered its third week, Woodsmith Mine was evacuated apart from a skeleton crew, with a number of roads including the A169, A171 and B1416 being closed.
