= 2022 United Kingdom wildfires =

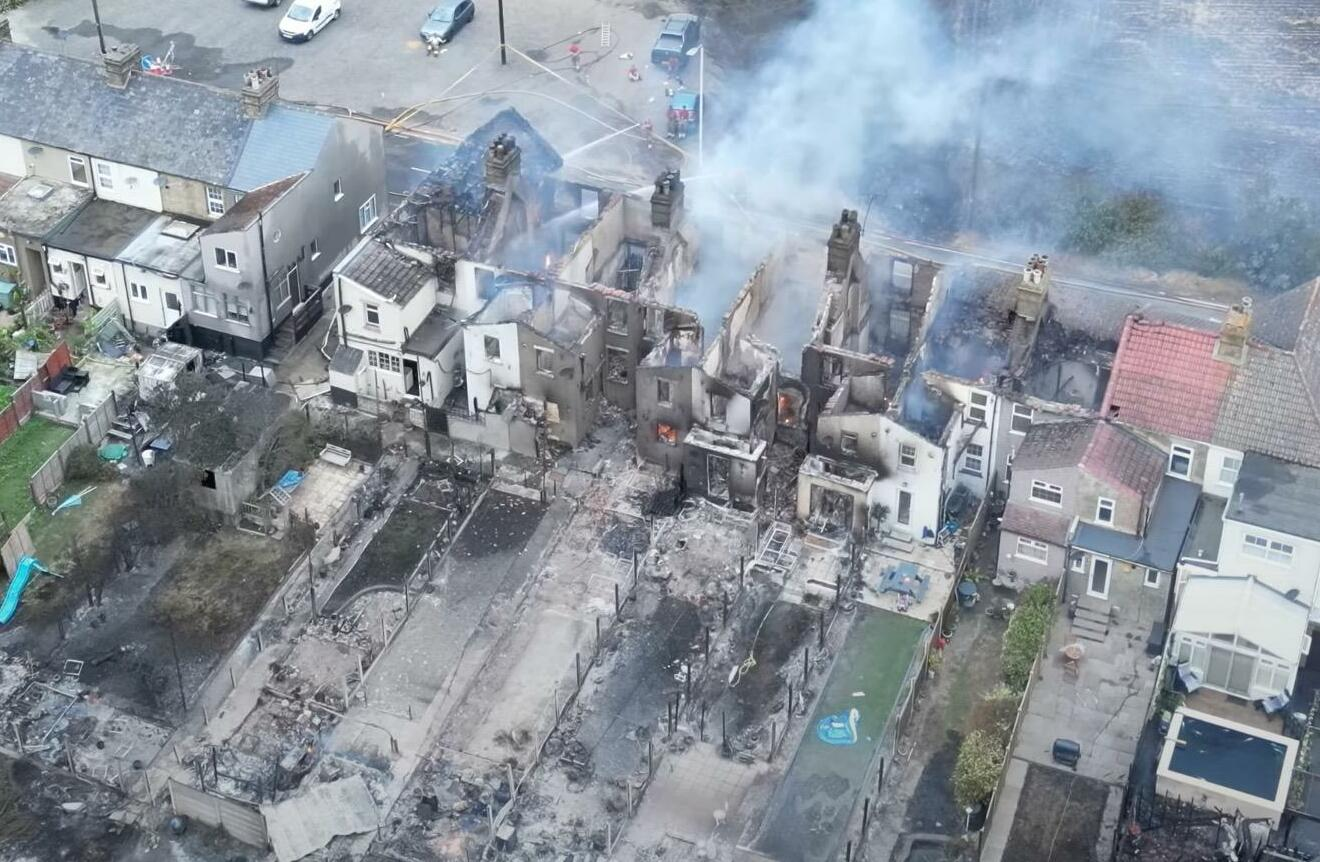
- Homes burning during the Wennington wildfire

Statistics
- Total fires: 151 (30 ha (74 acres) or larger)
- Total area: 20,362 ha (50,320 acres; 203.62 km^{2}; 78.62 sq mi)

Impacts
- Structures destroyed: 70+

The United Kingdom saw numerous wildfires throughout 2022 amid a wider outbreak across Europe and the Mediterranean; most fires occurred during the unprecedented summer heatwaves when the county experienced its highest temperatures on record. Some of these fires spread to urban areas and destroyed many properties, most notably during the Wennington wildfire.

== Overview ==
The European Forest Fire Information System (EFFIS) keeps records of wildfires in Europe and has maintained a database since 2004. Throughout 2022 it mapped 151 fires over 30 ha (74 acres), with a total burnt area of 20,362 ha (50,320 acres; 78.62 sq mi; 203.62 km^{2}). This was the highest number of fires on record and the second-highest area after 2019, however wildfires in 2025 surpassed both of these records.

Between June and August, fire services in England recorded 24,316 wildfires, a figure which the Press Association said were the highest in at least a decade. Five of England's 44 fire services did not supply figures, so the true number is likely to be higher. Mid-July saw a surge in wildfires amid record temperatures, with over 800 recorded on 19 July alone.

== March ==
On 19 March, a fire started shortly before 6:30 p.m. on marshland near Neston on the Wirral Peninsula. Six fire engines fought the blaze, which was extinguished by midnight after growing to 1 km^{2} (0.39 sq mi) and getting close to homes in Parkgate. Another fire spread for around 750 m (2,460 ft) between High Newton and Newby Bridge, forcing the closure of the A590 road. On 24 March, the NFCC urged people to take precautions as there had been over 70 significant wildfires across England and Wales.

== April ==
On 23 April, a large wildfire broke out on Canford Heath in Dorset, forcing the evacuation of twenty homes as over 80 firefighters fought the flames. An area of roughly 16.7 hectares (41 acres) was burnt and 23 animals were killed, with Dorset Wildlife Trust saying it would take 15 years for the heath to be restored. On 25 April, Dorset & Wiltshire Fire and Rescue Service investigators said that the fire was started deliberately.

== May ==
On 14 May, another fire broke out on Canford Heath, followed by a third on 22 May. The fire service confirmed that it was once again due to "human intervention".

== July ==
July saw a series of damaging wildfires across England as a record-breaking heatwave swept across the country, peaking on 19 July when temperatures reached 40.3 °C (104.5 °F) in Coningsby, the hottest temperature ever recorded in the UK. On this day alone, over 800 wildfires were recorded.

=== England ===
On 11 July, a crop fire started by the side of the A61 road near Ripon, briefly affecting traffic as smoke partially blocked the road. A grass fire at a solar farm near Verwood, Dorset damaged some solar panels and spread to around 1.5 ha (3.7 acres). Multiple fires started within the Salisbury Plain Training Area due to live firing exercises by the Ministry of Defence, however firefighters were unable to attend due to the risk of unexploded bombs. The fires merged into two large fires near Urchfont which covered an area of 1 km^{2} (0.39 sq mi) and 7.5 km^{2} (2.9 sq mi) each on 12 July. It was mostly extinguished after four days on 14 July; around 800 ha (2,000 acres) were burned and a helicopter was used to assist firefighting efforts. On 12 July, a grass fire on the cliffs between Tenby and Saundersfoot burned around 10 ha (25 acres). On 13 July, two wildfires broke out in Surrey at Hankley Common and Frensham Little Pond; they burned around 20 ha (49 acres) in total. A grass fire in Harlington, London damaged about 14 ha (35 acres) of shrubland. On 14 July, a fire near Baschurch burnt around 24 ha (59 acres) of straw, hay and hedgerows.

On 15 July, a large fire near Rowton Castle was tackled by 12 fire engines. On 17 July, 26 homes were evacuated in Bestwood after a grass fire spread to homes: one property was left badly damaged as others suffered burns to fences and sheds before eight fire engines extinguished the blaze after two hours. Another fire started in a field close to the M11 motorway near Littlebury; it was tackled by 15 fire crews and spread to 400 acres (160 ha), with embers from it causing a separate fire in a disused building at Great Chesterford railway station. On 18 July, a fire started in the Lickey Hills and spread to 5 ha (12 acres) and forced 15 people to evacuate as around 60 firefighters attended the blaze.

On 19 July, the London Fire Brigade (LFB) declared a major incident due to the number of fires across London, being one of 15 areas around the country to do so. The LFB had its busiest day since World War Two, receiving 2,670 calls compared to its normal 350 calls a day. 16 firefighters suffered heat-related injuries, two of which were hospitalised. A total of 41 properties were destroyed by fires, as well as many cars. Most were grass fires, and the LFB urged the public not to hold barbecues or bonfires, and to only dial 999 during an emergency or an immediate risk to life.

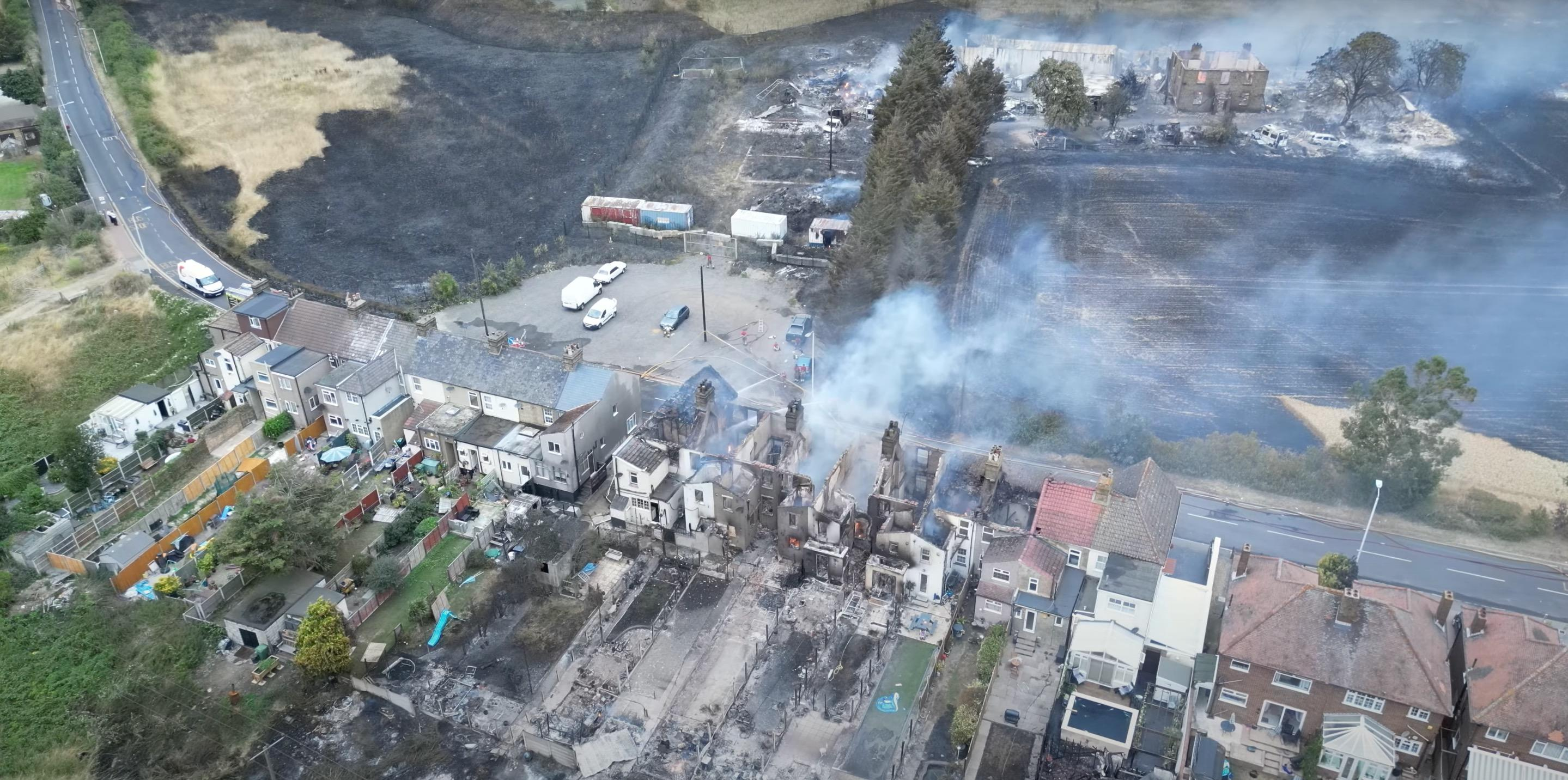
Homes destroyed by a wildfire in Wennington, London.

A large grass fire began near Wennington, London, which quickly spread to the village and destroyed 19 homes, twelve stables, five cars and more than 20 ha (49 acres) of grassland. A grassland wildfire in Dagenham spread to houses, destroying 14 and damaging others, with the additional loss of pets and cars. Another fire broke out next to the A2 on Dartford Heath near Durrell Dene, in Joyce Green, Kent. The local Spirits Rest Dartford Horse and Animal Sanctuary was heavily damaged. A large grass fire began by the M25 on Pea Lane in Upminster, causing smoke to billow across the motorway. A grass fire broke out near Bradgate Hill, Groby. 240 firefighters from Hertfordshire Fire and Rescue Service dealt with a large fire near Cheshunt. In South Yorkshire, a wildfire destroyed homes in Sprotbrough. There were also major fires in the Hatfield and Rossington areas. Grassland on New Brighton waterfront in Merseyside caught fire. In Cornwall, wildfire spread through fields near Zennor and Nare Head. In Norfolk the Norfolk Fire and Rescue Service declared a major incident after being called to more than 70 reports in a day, including two house fires. Around 33 ha (82 acres) of land was burnt by a fire at Wild Ken Hill in Norfolk. In Ashmanhaugh, two semi-detached properties were destroyed by a fire. A field fire in Poringland spread to three homes, two of which were destroyed. A crop field fire, which covered about 2 ha (4.9 acres), forced the A47 road to close until 7 p.m.. Five properties in Brancaster Staithe were destroyed by a large field fire. About 20 homes were either destroyed or badly damaged in Ashill when a fire in a neighbouring field got out of control.

On 24 July, a third wildfire started in Hankley Common, Surrey, burning at least 8 ha (20 acres) of land; it was declared a major incident. A fire in Hayes affected the visibility at Heathrow Airport's runways due to the smoke.

== August ==
On 5 August, a wildfire broke out on Upton Heath in Dorset. Investigators believe the fire was started deliberately. The same day, a wildfire broke out on playfields in nearby Weymouth. On 6 August, a wildfire broke out in the Boscawen Park area of Truro in Cornwall. 40 firefighters from the Cornwall Fire and Rescue Service attended the blaze. A wildfire broke out sparked from a train on the Swanage Railway in Dorset, which burned grassland on an embankment between Harman's Cross and Corfe Castle. On 7 August, a wildfire burned woodland and damaged the rears of properties in Hereford Road in Feltham, West London. London Fire Brigade said crews had managed to stop flames spreading to about 30 homes. On 8 August, seven fire engines, six off-road vehicles and a water carrier attended a fire which began on a farm near Houghton, West Sussex. It burned a total of 150 ha (370 acres) of crops and stubble. A fire burned a cornfield near Winterborne Stickland, Dorset, which affected 7.4 acres (3.0 ha) of corn. On 9 August, a grass fire began in Enfield, London, which damaged about 5 ha (12 acres) of grassland. A gorse fire began on Rushmere Heath on the edge of Ipswich, which burned about 1.5 ha (3.7 acres). A fire near Fishbourne, West Sussex destroyed around 20 ha (49 acres) of grassland, whilst another in Walberton covering 6.1 ha (15 acres) forced a nearby care home to be evacuated.

On 10 August, a fire began in Cherington, Gloucestershire, people were warned to avoid the area around Tarlington Road. On 11 August, two separate field fires at Turners Hill destroyed around 16 ha (40 acres) of grassland. On 12 August, a large fire began on Studland Heath, which resulted in evacuations and forced the suspension of the Sandbanks Ferry. At its height, 90 firefighters were fighting the blaze, and evidence of a campfire and a disposable barbecue were found in the ashes. The ferry was used to get people off the beach in Studland, and to transport firefighting vehicles from the other side. The fire was extinguished on 15 August after burning about 5 ha (12 acres) of National Trust nature reserve. In Broomfield, Essex, a fire burnt 37 ha (91 acres). A wildfire in a field threatened homes in Barne Barton in Plymouth, Devon. Two wildfires broke out in Cornwall, one in Camborne and another alongside the A30 road near Redruth. On 13 August, three gardens were damaged in Harlow after a fire burnt 15 ha (37 acres) of grass and affected some overhead cables. In Watford, a caravan park was evacuated after 20 ha (49 acres) of fields, hedgerows and trees burned close to an industrial estate which houses the headquarters of UK National Lottery operator Camelot Group. A wildfire burned near West Calder in West Lothian for three days. On 14 August, Mark Hardingham, chair of the National Fire Chiefs Council (NFCC), said that the hot and dry conditions in 2022 had resulted in a 200% increase in the number of wildfires compared to the previous year. There were 247 wildfires in 2021, and 745 in 2022 as of 14 August.

On 20 August, a heath fire was extinguished on Dewlands Common in Verwood, Dorset. On 21 August, a wildfire burned on Bourne Valley Nature Reserve in Dorset.
