= Dava =

Dava may refer to:

- Dava, a division of Hindu Akhara
- Dava (comics), a fictional martial artist appearing in comics published by DC Comics
- Dava Bazaar, an area in South Mumbai noted for producing medical and scientific instruments as well as lab chemicals
- Dava (Dacian), the Geto-Dacian name for a city, town or fortress
- Dava railway station, a former railway station at Dava muir in the Spey Valley, Scotland
- Democratic Alliance for Diversity and Awakening, German political party
- Dava, Scotland, a region in the Scottish Highlands.
- Dava wildfire, a wildfire that occurred in the Scottish Highlands.

== People ==
- Dava Newman, American professor of Aeronautics and Astronautics
- Dava Ramadhan, Indonesian footballer
- Dava Savel, American television producer
- Dava Sobel (born 1947), American scientific author
- Dava (singer), American pop singer
