= Megafire =

Type of fire

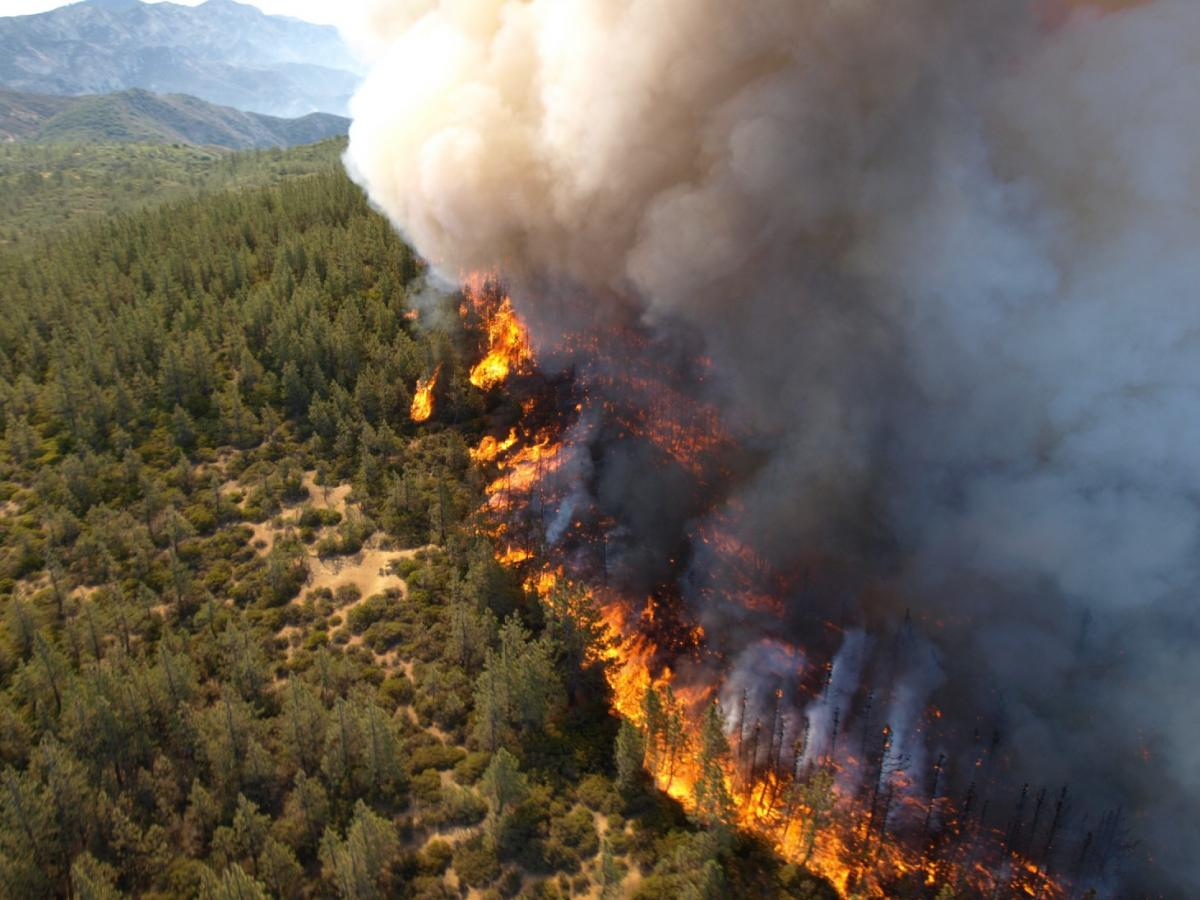
Active flame front of the Zaca Fire, 2007, at the time the second-largest fire on record in California

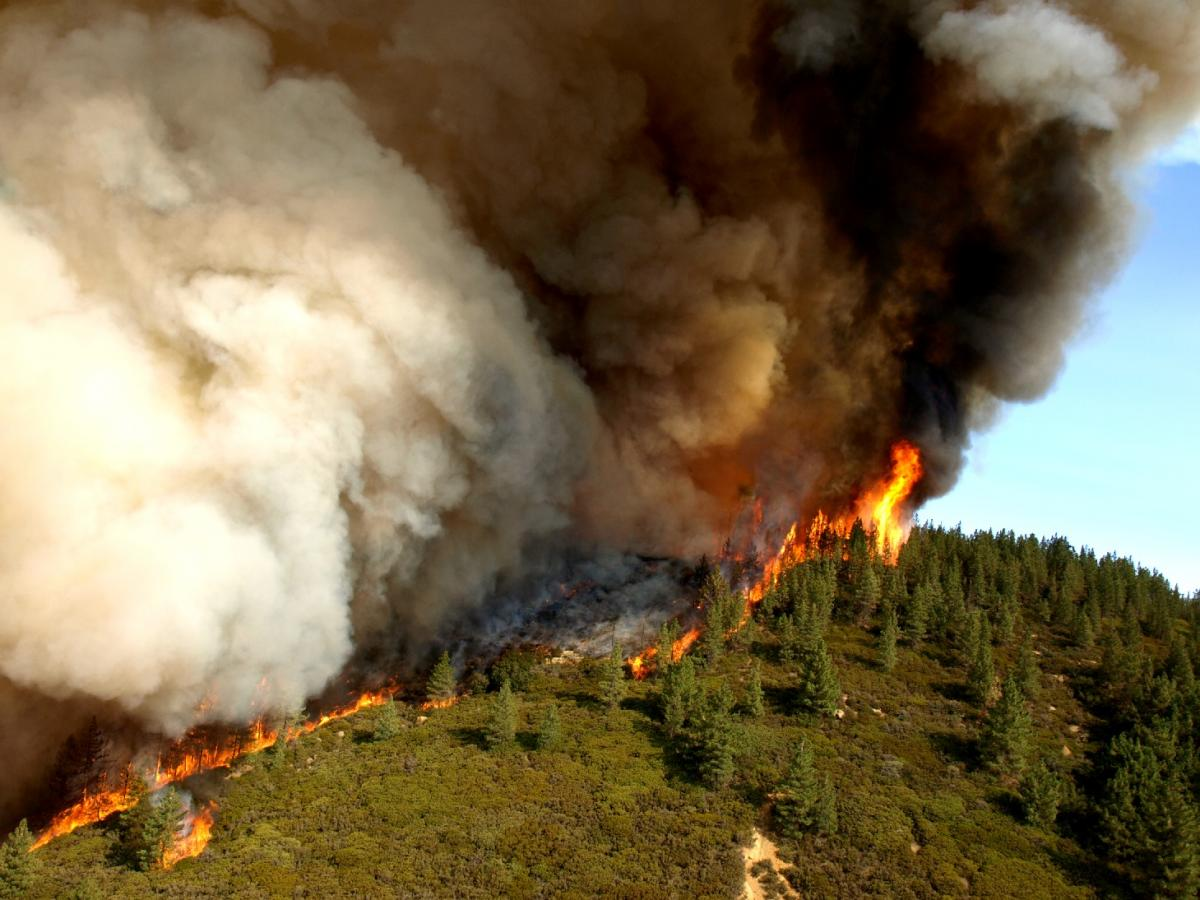
Active flame front of the Zaca Fire, the 12th-largest fire on record for California as of 2022

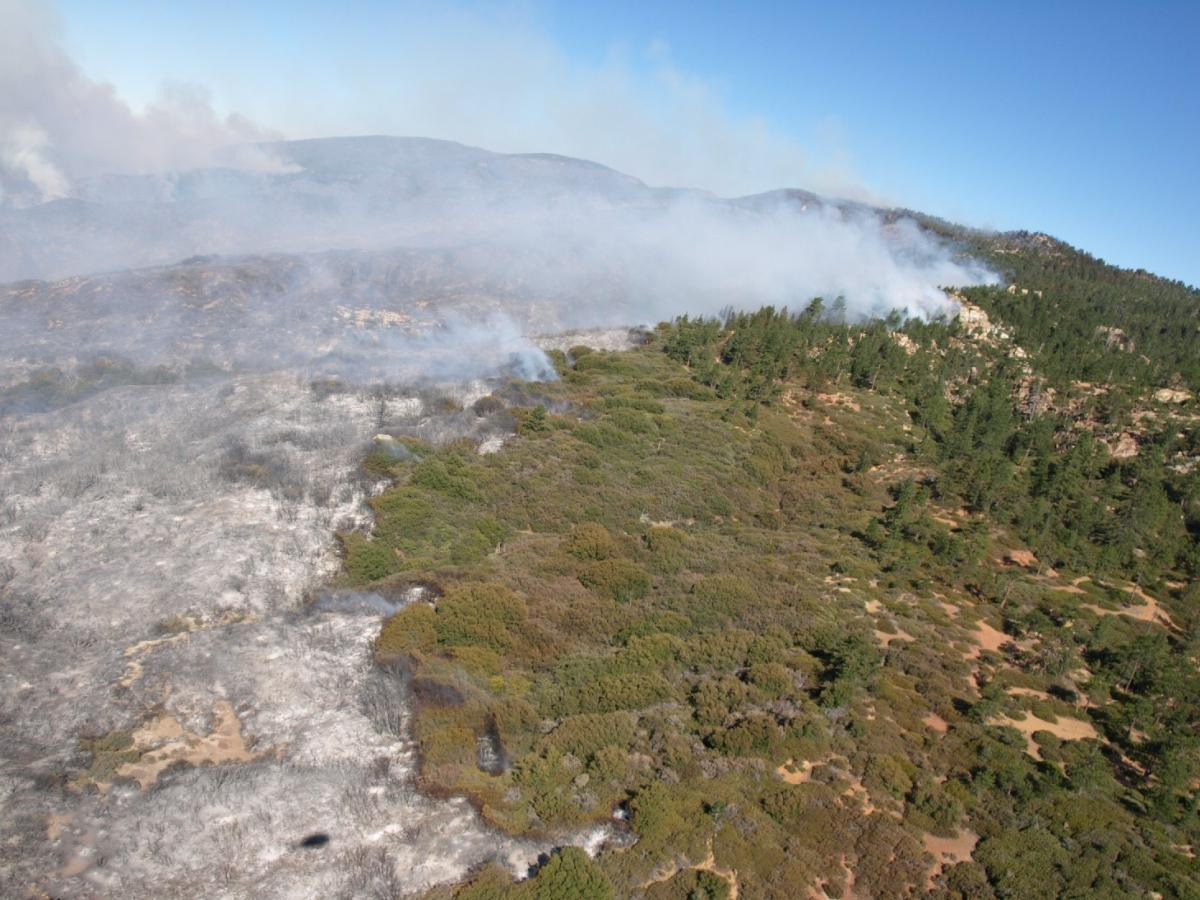
Smoldering fire front of the Zaca Fire, 2007

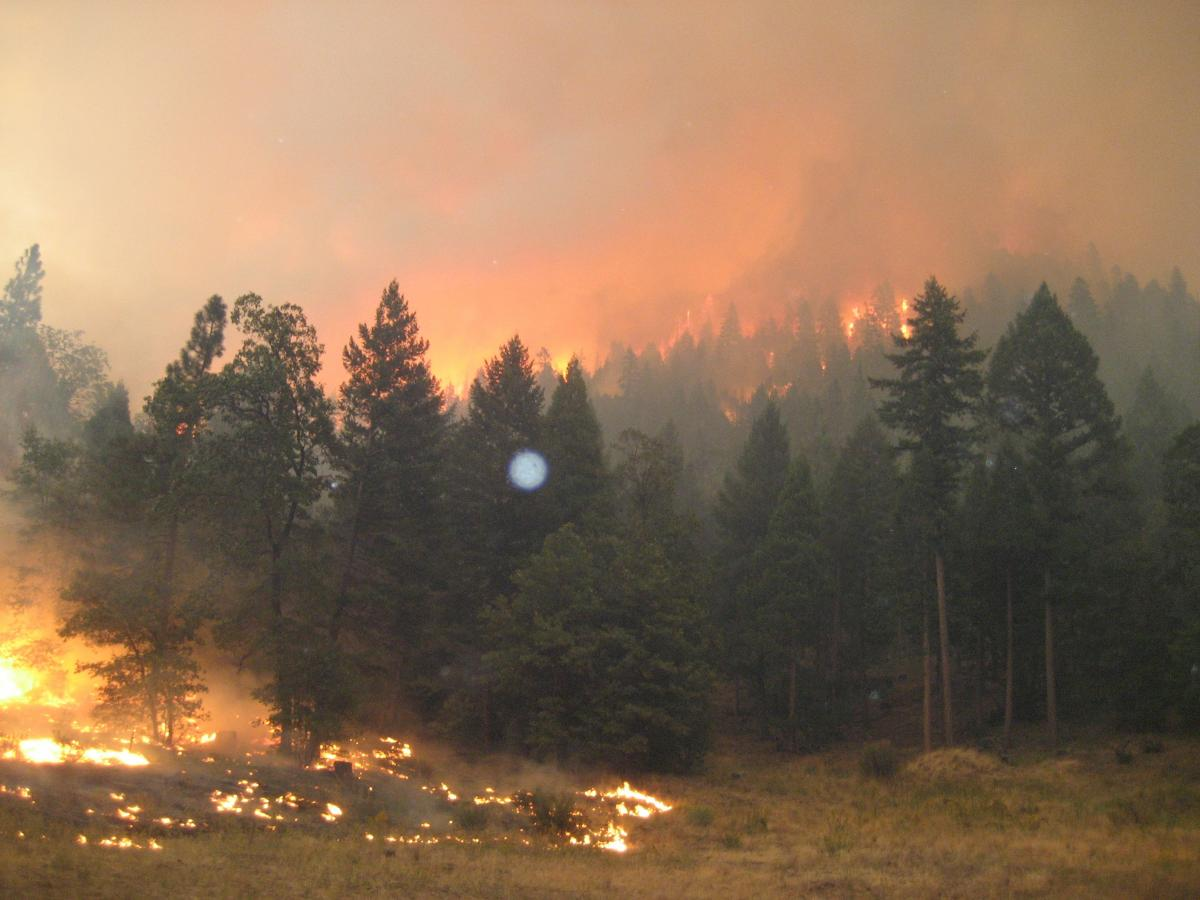
Moonlight fire, California, September 2007

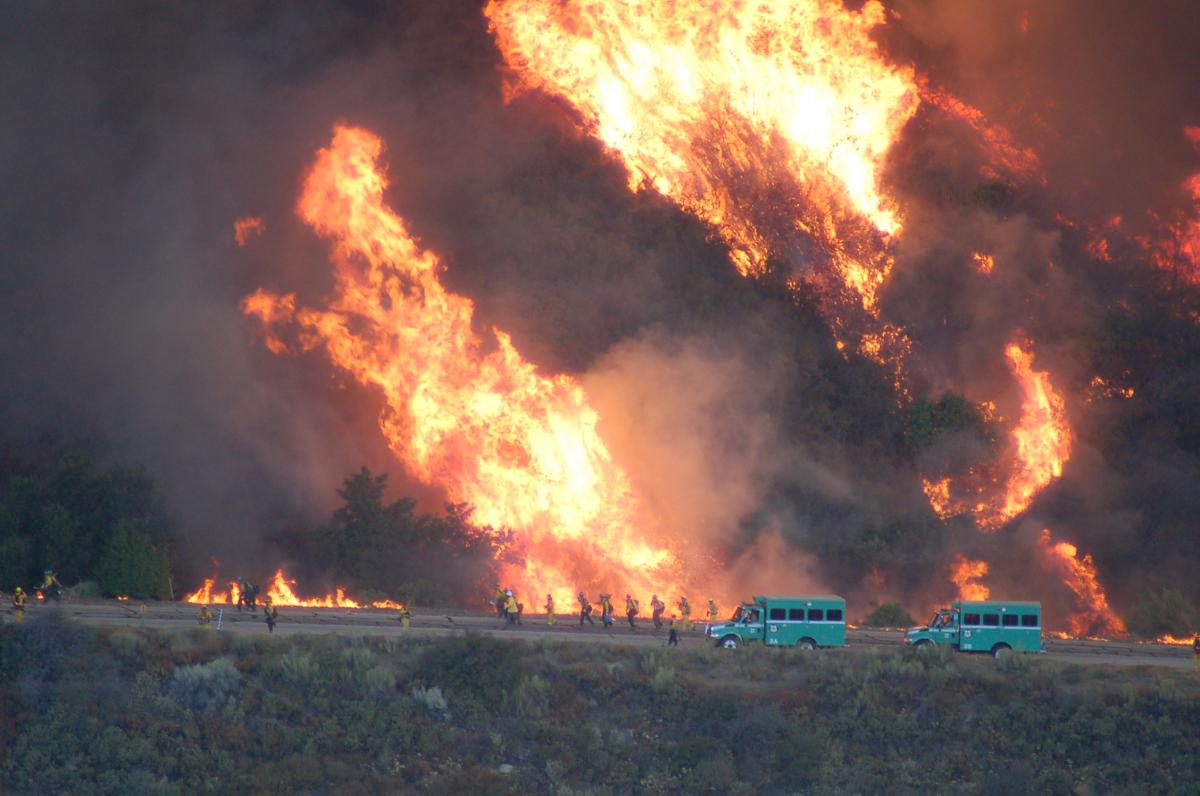
Ground to crown flame spread, Day Fire, near Old Highway 99, California, September 12, 2007

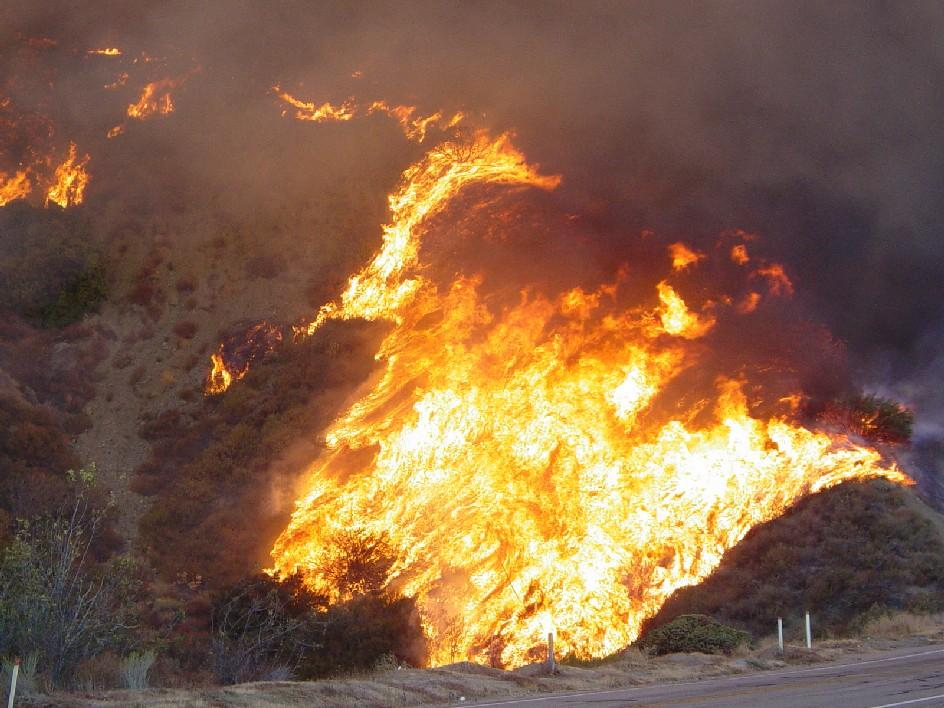
The 162,702-acre Day Fire, near Old Highway 99

A megafire is an exceptional fire that devastates a large area. They are characterised by their intensity, size, duration and uncontrollable scale. There is no precise scientific definition. A megafire may or may not be a firestorm.

== Definition ==
The concept may vary by region or country. In Europe, they are characterized as beginning at 1,000 hectares (10 km², 2,470 acres), in size, while in the United States and elsewhere, they may be classified beginning at 10,000 hectares (100 km², 24,710 acres). Another figure used in the United States is 40,000 hectares (99,000 acres) (400 km²).

A recent NASA study expands the megafire definition to include a variety of factors: "Between climate change and almost a century of fire exclusion, forest fires have become more extreme in size, severity, complexity of behavior and resistance to extinction. These fires are commonly referred as megafires and are at the extremes of historical variations."

Using one definition, only 3% of all fires reach "megafire" status, yet they are responsible for more than 50% of burned surfaces on the planet.

In recent years, some fires have burned over a million acres, becoming what has been dubbed as gigafires. These include the Yellowstone Fire in Montana and Idaho that burned 1.58 million acres in 1988; the Taylor Complex in Alaska that burned 1.3 million acres in 2004; the fires that burned 1.5 million acres in Victoria and New South Wales, Australia in 2020; and the August Complex in California in 2020.

A 2022 United Nations report used the term "wildfire" to distinguish "an unusual or extraordinary free-burning vegetation fire which may be started maliciously, accidentally, or through natural means, that negatively influences social, economic, or environmental values". This term was used in contrast to "landscape fire" which describes a natural, more ordinary, less harmful occurrence.

== Operation of a megafire ==
These fires form pyrocumulus and pyro cumulonimbus, clouds which are also named "fire-breathing dragons". They cause giant thunderstorms, which often have little rain but with a strong potential for lightning, which can easily create and spread new fires. These huge fires are so intense that they generate their own weather.

A merger of fires can create a megafire, such as multiple fires during the 2019–20 Australian bushfire season in Australia, where multiple cases of many fires joining into a gigantic blaze were noted.

== Causes ==
External videos
- "What are California megafires? Things to Know", 11.20.2019, Knowable Magazine

A megafire can be caused by various factors, such as high temperatures, drought, human activities, and poor health of forests. Almost all (96%) of the most disastrous 500 megafires in the past decade have occurred during periods of unusual heat and/or drought. The number of uncontrollable megafires is increasing.

== Probability ==
A 2022 United Nations report said that, at the end of the 21st century, the probability of a major wildfire occurring somewhere in the world in any given year—an event "similar to Australia's 2019–2020 Black Summer or the huge Arctic fires in 2020"—will have increased by 31% to 57%.

== Historic megafires ==
Megafires have affected multiple regions around the world, including Amazonia, California, Australia, Siberia, Greenland, Mediterranean Basin and the Congo Basin. They occur on all 6 continents that are permanently inhabited, including areas near the Arctic Circle.

In November 2018, the Camp Fire, a megafire in California, killed 85 people and ravaged 60,000 ha (150,000 acres).

By early 2019, in the Mediterranean Basin, the countries affected by such fires included Spain, Portugal, Turkey, and Greece.

At the end of 2019, Brazil, Congo, Russia, and the United States had suffered from megafires on a scale described as "unprecedented".

In Australia, during the 2019–20's bushfire season, numerous megafires erupted. In all, an estimated 24.3 million hectares (243,000 square kilometres) burned, with one consuming 1,500,000 acres (610,000 ha).

The August Complex Fire in Northern California surpassed one million acres during the 2020 California wildfire season.

In July 2021, the Bootleg Fire in Oregon overran chemical retardant firebreaks set by firefighters. It was so large and hot that it changed the local weather.

In February 2024, the Smokehouse Creek Fire in Texas and Oklahoma burned over a million acres within three days.

On 28 June 2025, Scotland experienced the Dava wildfire. The fire lasted for four days and burned around 11,827 hectares. Scientists later designated it as the first megafire in Scotland and the UK.

== See also ==
- List of largest fires of the 21st century
- Firestorm
- Wildfire
- Fire
- Conflagration
- Firefighting
