= 2004 Alaska wildfires =

Series of fires in Alaska, United States

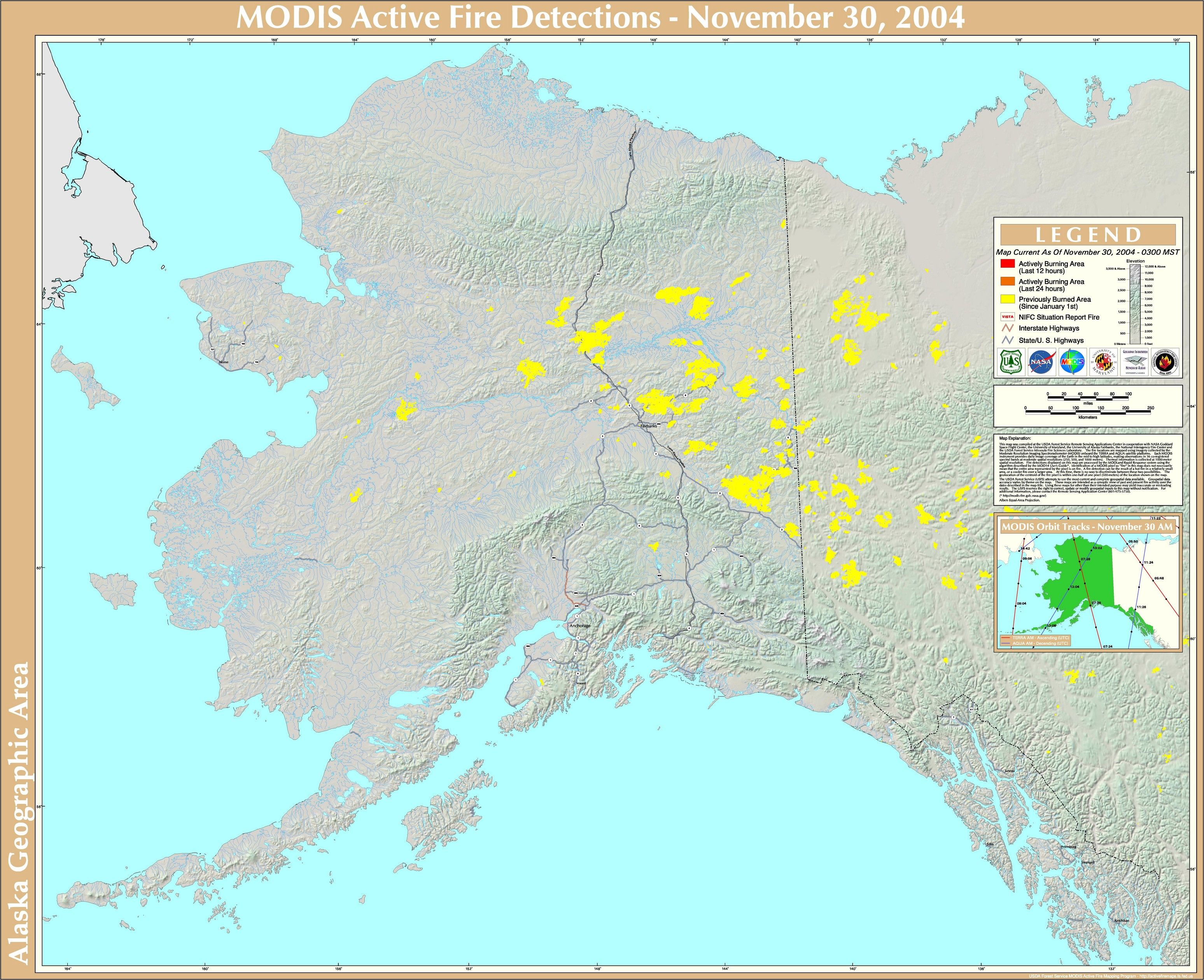
- A map of the 2004 fire season's effect on Alaska and the Yukon.

Statistics
- Total fires: 701
- Total area: 6,600,000 acres (10,300 mi^{2}; 27,000 km^{2})+

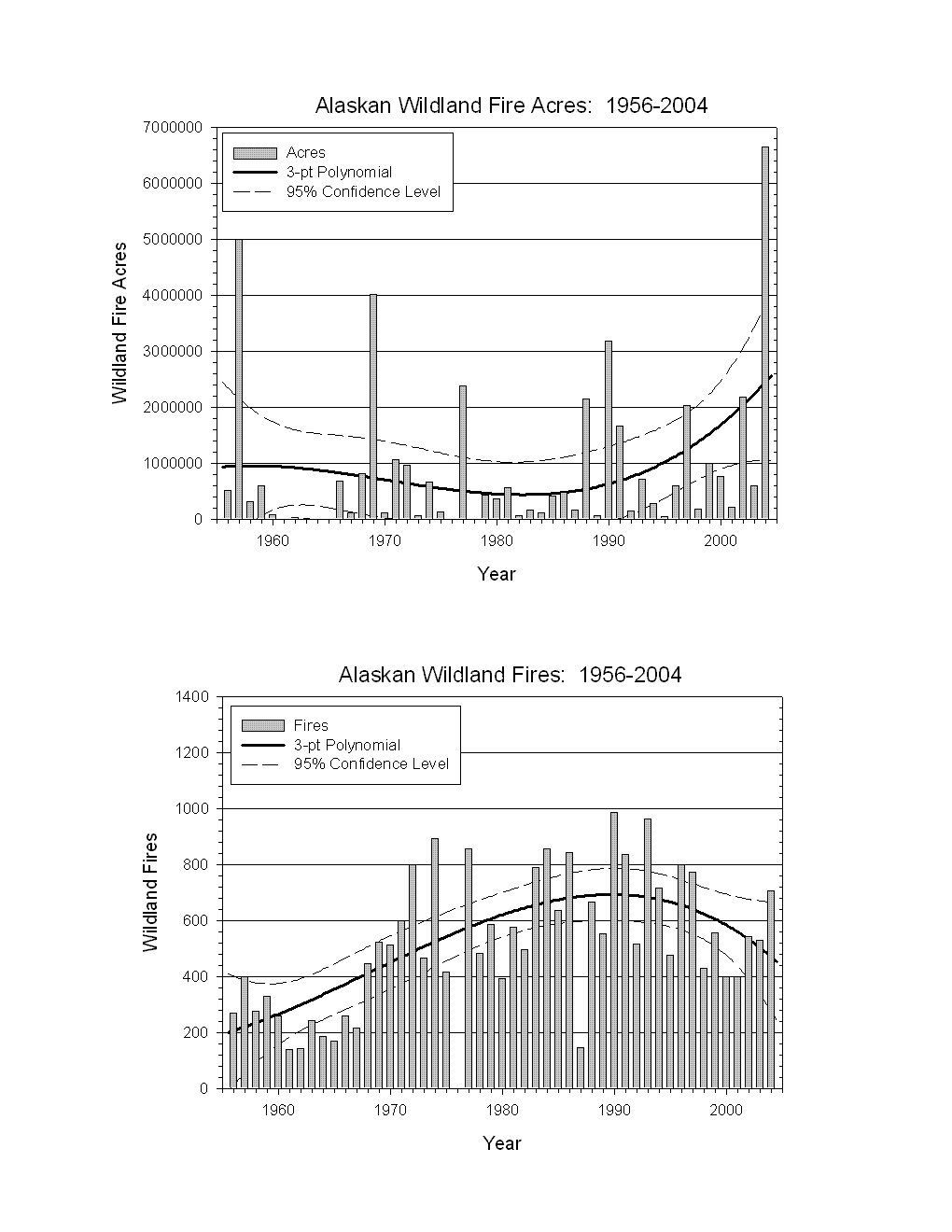
Graphs record the area burned and number of wildfires in Alaska from 1956 to 2004.

The 2004 Alaska fire season was the worst wildfire season on record in the U.S. state of Alaska in terms of area burned. Though the 1989 fire season recorded more fires, nearly 1,000, the 2004 season burned more than 6,600,000 acres (10,300 sq mi; 27,000 km2) in just 701 fires. The largest of these fires was the Taylor Complex Fire. This fire consumed over 1,700,000 acres (2,700 mi^{2}; 6,900 km^{2}) and was the deemed to be the largest fire in the United States from at least 1997 to 2019. Out of all 701 fires, 426 fires were started by humans and 215 by lightning.

== Causes of the fires ==
The general weather pattern for Interior Alaska is May is wet, June is hot and dry, July is transitional, and August is rainy. Beginning in May 2004, the summer was extremely warm and wet in comparison to typical Interior Alaska summer climate. The fire season was forecasted as average. Beginning in mid June, there was a drying trend, and was second warmest in 100 years. After the conclusion of the season, summer 2004 was described by a National Weather Service meteorologist as "three Junes."

Much of the rain over the summer of 2004 came during thunderstorms, which resulted in record amounts of lightning triggering many of the original fires near Fairbanks, Alaska. Wildfires are prone to develop in areas with frequent lightning strikes. After months of lightning and increased temperatures, an uncharacteristically dry August resulted in fires continuing through September.

== Impacts on climate change and landscape ==
Alaska has a climate that of the boreal zone, more commonly known as taiga. The boreal zone, across the globe, makes up more than 25% of global forests, and when wildfires occur it is a top leader in carbon emissions. Approximately 12% of the world's carbon is stored in top layer soil and this part is the first to burn in any wildfire. These emissions have some of the greatest impacts on natural carbon balance, and Alaska gives its fair contribution. Typically Alaskan forest fires make up 41% of the United States' carbon emissions from wildland fires, but more recently with warming conditions and more wildfire occurrences these figures have gone all the way to 89%. Landscape is also changing as a result of wildfires. Less canopy is provided in the aftermath of a wildfire, hence soil temperatures may rise, rendering the area uninhabitable by certain species and allow new, non-native species to thrive. When soil temperatures rise, permafrost is also revealed and begins to melt away, which can lead to landslides and erosion.

== Impacts on air quality ==
The 2004 fire season of Alaska had large impacts on the air quality and safety of nearby populations. These impacts most significant in Fairbanks, Alaska. For over 15 days, particulate matter measured 1,000 micrograms per cubic meter, well over the EPA thresholds for hazardous and unhealthy air quality. To put it into perspective, an area deemed to be unhealthy typically has 65 micrograms of smoke particulate per cubic meter, while an area deemed to be hazardous has anymore than 250 micrograms per cubic meter. Normal levels in Fairbanks, Alaska are typically 10 micrograms per cubic meter. The main issue with smoke particulate is not the smoke itself but the matter that is mixed in. Wildfire smoke is usually made up of acids, chemicals, metals, soil/dust, and pollen/mold spores.
