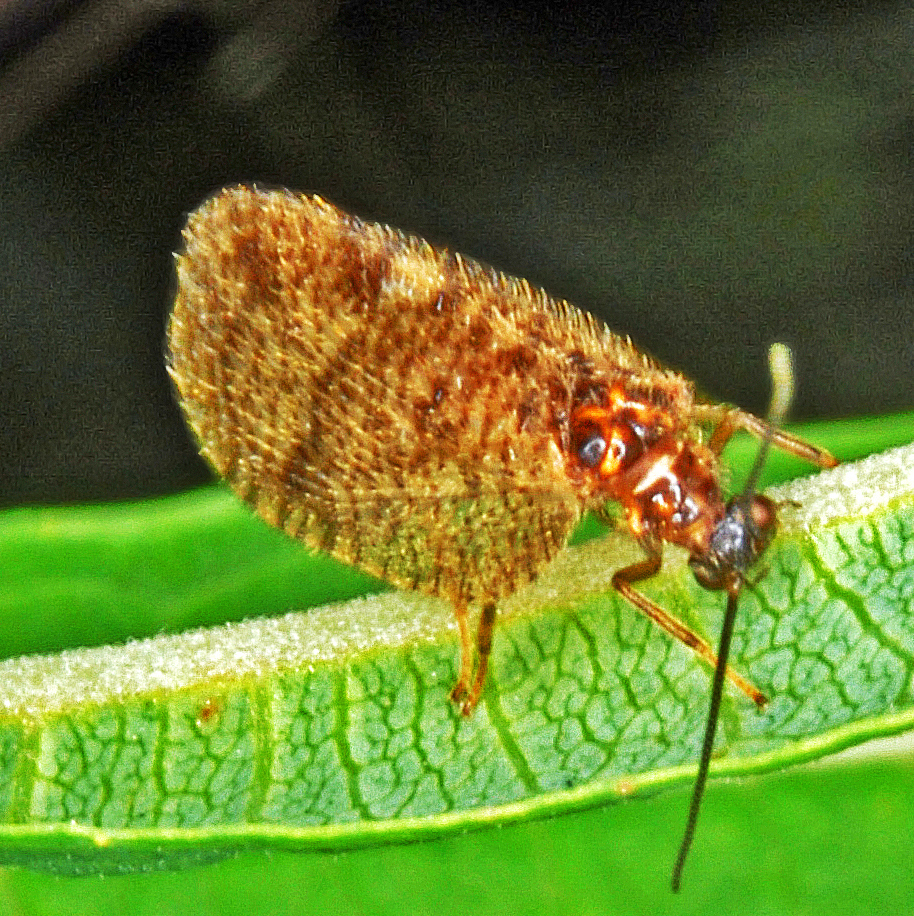
- Megalomus tortricoides

Scientific classification
- Domain: Eukaryota
- Kingdom: Animalia
- Phylum: Arthropoda
- Class: Insecta
- Order: Neuroptera
- Family: Hemerobiidae
- Genus: Megalomus; Rambur, 1842

Synonyms
- Spinomegalomus Hagen, 1888

= Megalomus =

Genus of lacewings

Megalomus is a genus of brown lacewings in the family Hemerobiidae. There are more than 40 described species in Megalomus.

== Species ==
These 44 species belong to the genus Megalomus:

- Megalomus acunai Alayo, 1968
- Megalomus amnistiatus Monserrat, 1997
- Megalomus angulatus Carpenter, 1940
- Megalomus arytaenoideus C.-k. Yang, 1997
- Megalomus atomarius Navás, 1936
- Megalomus australis (González Olazo, 1992)
- Megalomus axillatus Navás, 1927
- Megalomus balachowskyi Lestage, 1928
- Megalomus carpenteri Penny, Adams & Stange, 1997
- Megalomus caucasicus Makarkin, 1991
- Megalomus darwini Banks, 1924
- Megalomus democraticus Monserrat, 1997
- Megalomus densistriatus Henriksen, 1922
- Megalomus elephiscus C.-k. Yang, 1997
- Megalomus fidelis (Banks, 1897)
- Megalomus flinti (Nakahara, 1965)
- Megalomus formosanus Banks, 1937
- Megalomus fraternus C.-k. Yang & Z.-q. Liu, 2001
- Megalomus hirtus (Linnaeus, 1761)
- Megalomus impudicus (Gerstaecker, 1888)
- Megalomus luigionii Navas, 1928
- Megalomus maculosus Makarkin, 1991
- Megalomus magallanicus New, 1990
- Megalomus marginatus Banks, 1910
- Megalomus minor Banks in Baker, 1905
- Megalomus moestus Banks, 1895
- Megalomus monticellii Navas, 1928
- Megalomus navasi Lacroix, 1912
- Megalomus nebulosus Navás, 1926
- Megalomus nigratus (Navás, 1929)
- Megalomus obscurus Steinmann, 1965
- Megalomus parvus Krüger, 1922
- Megalomus pictus Hagen, 1861
- Megalomus pyraloides Rambur, 1842
- Megalomus rafaeli Penny & Monserrat, 1985
- Megalomus ricoi Monserrat, 1997
- Megalomus sammnesianus González Olazo, 1987
- Megalomus setosulus (Walker, 1860)
- Megalomus tibetanus C.-k. Yang et al. in Huang et al., 1988
- Megalomus tinctus (Jarzembowski, 1980)
- Megalomus tineoides Rambur, 1842
- Megalomus tortricoides Rambur, 1842
- Megalomus uniformis Banks, 1935
- Megalomus yunnanus C.-k. Yang, 1986
