= Megalomus carpenteri =

Scientific classification
- Kingdom: Animalia
- Phylum: Arthropoda
- Clade: Pancrustacea
- Class: Insecta
- Order: Neuroptera
- Family: Hemerobiidae
- Genus: Megalomus
- Species: M. carpenteri

Binomial name
- Megalomus carpenteri Penny, Adams & Stange, 1997

Species of lacewing

Megalomus carpenteri is a species of brown lacewing in the family Hemerobiidae. It is found in North America. The specific epithet carpenteri honors paleoentomologist Frank M. Carpenter for his taxonomic work on the Neuroptera.
