= 2019 United Kingdom wildfires =

Series of wildfires

- Saddleworth Moor wildfire on 27 February
- Date: 26 February 2019 – 18 May 2019

Statistics
- Total fires: 111 (30 ha (74 acres) or larger)
- Total area: 28,754 ha (71,050 acres; 287.54 km^{2}; 111.02 sq mi)

Wildfire data for the UK between 2011 and 23 April 2019

2019 United Kingdom wildfires were a series of wildfires that began on 26 February 2019 and ended on 18 May 2019. The series of wildfires was considered unusual because they took place early in the year. Areas affected by the wildfires in 2019 included those that had already been burnt by wildfires during the summer of 2018. The fires have created many air pollution problems for the UK. The causes of most of the fires have been attributed to much higher than average temperatures and drought conditions that have prevailed since the spring of 2018. There were 137 wildfires larger than 25 hectares (250,000 m^{2}) recorded in the United Kingdom in 2019. This beats the previous record of 79 from 2018.

== Background ==
Wildfires are a common annual occurrence in the United Kingdom, though they are rarely serious and generally have a limited impact. According to the Forestry Commission, between 2009 and 2017 an average of 4,600 hectares (11,000 acres; 18 sq mi) of land was burned by wildfire incidents every year in England, with the majority covering less than 1 hectare (2.5 acres; 12,000 sq yd) and only five exceeding an area greater than 1,000 hectares (2,500 acres; 3.9 sq mi). With the exception of years featuring higher than average rainfall, wildfires in the United Kingdom typically occur in two spells between March and April and July and September, and are uncommon before spring. Controlled burns to manage the growth of heather are permitted in England and Scotland from October until mid-April.

The United Kingdom had previously experienced a large number of wildfires in the summer 2018 following spells of high temperatures and low levels of precipitation in the preceding months. Other notable episodes of increased national wildfire activity have occurred with years of lower than average precipitation, such as in 1976, 2003, 2006, and 2011.

== Causes ==
Elevated temperatures in February and April have been cited as contributory factors to the extent of the wildfires so early in the year. On 26 February the highest winter temperature ever recorded in the United Kingdom was reached with 21.2 °C (70.2 °F) registered at Kew Gardens. This was caused by a high pressure system over central Europe driving air from southern latitudes towards the United Kingdom and Ireland, bringing dry, settled conditions and unseasonably warm weather. England, Scotland and Wales all broke their regional temperature records, with England and Wales exceeding 20.0 °C (68.0 °F) in winter for the first time. The Easter weekend in late April additionally saw very warm conditions. Scotland, Wales, and Northern Ireland all had their hottest Easter Sunday on record on 20 April, with all four countries of the United Kingdom recording their hottest ever Easter Monday temperatures the following day.

Comparatively low rainfall over the winter was also suggested as increasing the probability of the wildfires, with the lack of moisture combining with the high temperatures in February to dry out vegetation, creating an easily flammable source within the grasslands and moorlands at an earlier stage of the year than usual. A spell of dry weather during the middle of April was also described by the Met Office as a factor that heightened the risk of the later fires.

The impact of climate change in partly driving conditions conducive to wildfires in the United Kingdom is uncertain. Research does however suggest the probability of wildfires across moorlands in the Peak District will increase with warmer and drier weather.

== February ==
Fires in three separate parts across England and Scotland broke out on 27 February, the day that saw the country's warmest winter temperature on record. Two separate fires reported one hour apart struck Ashdown Forest in West Sussex that afternoon, affecting 14 hectares (35 acres; 0.054 sq mi) of woodland, with a third noted shortly afterwards. The fires caused no injuries and were brought under control by 5pm that day after sixty-five firefighters attended the scene. It was later revealed that the first two fires had been unintentionally started by volunteers clearing gorse from the woodland, with an unexpected rush of wind and warm temperatures blowing a managed burn out of control.

Other fires reported during the day included a grassland blaze Lancashire, a gorse fire in Glyndyfrdwy, Denbighshire, in which a man was taken to hospital after being trapped in his tractor by the flames, and in Aberdare. Emergency services also responded to several fires on Cornwall's Lizard peninsula thought to be caused by arson.

Later on the evening of 26 February a fire broke out on Saddleworth Moor in Oldham, Greater Manchester, rapidly spreading across 390 hectares (960 acres; 1.5 sq mi). The same night saw approximately 800 square metres (0.20 acres; 960 sq yd) of gorse burn at Arthur's Seat in Edinburgh, prompting almost 200 calls to the emergency services. By the morning of 27 February both fires were brought under control, though Public Health England advised residents of communities close to Saddleworth Moor to remain indoors and close windows to avoid inhaling smoke. Though there were no reported injuries at Arthur's Seat, concerns were raised over the fire's impact on rare species living at the site, such as the bordered brown lacewing, whose distribution across the United Kingdom comprised just one other site in Scotland.

== April ==
All wildfires in the UK between 1 Jan and 30 Apr 2019

By 23 April ninety-six wildfires greater than 25 hectares (62 acres; 0.097 sq mi) had been recorded in the United Kingdom, eclipsing the total observed in the whole of 2018 and equalling that year's burned land area of approximately 18,000 hectares (44,000 acres; 69 sq mi).

England

Over the Easter weekend (18–21 April) England saw temperatures rise as high as 25.8 °C (78.4 °F). On 20 April Ilkley Moor in West Yorkshire was ablaze with two fires covering an area of approximately 2.5 hectares (6.2 acres; 30,000 sq yd). Fire crews remained on the moor for two days and a man was later charged with arson. On 21 April a barbecue caused a second fire in the county to break out on Marsden Moor, a Site of Special Scientific Interest thirty-five miles away, drawing more than fifty firefighters to the site. More than 280 hectares (690 acres; 1.1 sq mi) of moorland was affected, destroying more than £200,000 of habitat restoration work and imperiling the nesting sites of some species of birds, such as curlews, whose populations in the United Kingdom are considered under threat. By 23 April the National Trust, the owners of Marsden Moor, reported that the fire had spread to cover 3,700 hectares (9,100 acres; 14 sq mi) and described it as the most substantial blaze to hit the area for years.

Other fires across England in late April included a series of twelve blazes over Dartmoor on 22 April, with eight crews battling burning vegetation spanning 7 miles (11 km). A moorland fire near Tintwistle in Derbyshire was also tackled on the same day.

Scotland

Moray wildfire on 23 April.

The evening of 13 April saw a forest fire emerge between Loch Bradan and Loch Doon in East Ayrshire, the source of which, while unknown, was suggested by the Scottish Fire and Rescue Service (SFRS) to have been exacerbated by the recent dry weather. Thirty-five firefighters also tackled a 100 hectares (250 acres; 0.39 sq mi) fire near Ballindalloch in Moray that evening, and helped by a helicopter waterbombing the area the blaze was extinguished by the afternoon of 15 April. Emergency services were further alerted on 14 April to two fires in the Scottish Highlands near Kinbrace in Sutherland and near John O'Groats.

On 19 April the SFRS issued a wildfire warning and urged the public to abide by the Scottish Outdoor Access Code to minimise any further risk of fire formation. That day a number of fires across moorland and grassland on the Isle of Bute were extinguished with no injuries. A blaze covering 30 hectares (74 acres; 0.12 sq mi) later broke out in Lochaber on 21 April, and flames took hold of grassland in West Dunbartonshire on the evening of 22 April.

A wildfire broke out in Knockando, Scotland on the 22nd around 3pm. It was described as 'one of the largest fires the UK has seen in years'. In the first day, the fire destroyed more than 25 square miles (16,000 acres). The blaze created a plume of smoke that could be seen from space. By the 25th, firefighters thought they had tackled most of the blaze and left the scene. However, they were called back on the 26th when it was reignited. This further fire destroyed 50 square kilometres (19 sq mi), as of the 29th. At its height, around 80 firefighters, two helicopters, 19 fire engines and specialist resources were called upon to help tackle the fire, which was on four fronts. At its height, around 80 firefighters, two helicopters, 19 fire engines and specialist resources were called upon to help tackle the fire, which was on four fronts. Additionally, the fire caused several nearby properties to be evacuated. The fire was fully extinguished by 9 May.

Wales

In Wales a series of grassland fires on the Gower peninsula were reported over three days to 15 April, causing local road closures and raising concerns over the potential ecological damage. That evening two large grassland fires fanned by strong winds spread in Rhondda Cynon Taff and Rhigos before being extinguished the following morning.

== May ==
On 13 May the Scottish Fire and Rescue Service issued a wildfire warning for parts of Scotland after temperatures were forecast to rise above 20 °C. The day before a fire had broken out between Melvich and Strathy in the Scottish Highlands which burned for six days and destroyed 8,100 hectares (20,000 acres; 31 sq mi) of Flow Country peatland across Caithness and Sutherland, including approximately 610 hectares (1,500 acres; 2.4 sq mi) of the Forsinard Flows National Nature Reserve. Electricity to 800 households in Sutherland was also disrupted. Control over the blaze was assisted by rainfall over the night of 17–18 May, which also helped tackle a further fire burning across heath and woodland to the south of Forres in Moray since 16 May. A study published at the end of 2019 by WWF Scotland estimated that the Flow Country fire doubled Scotland's carbon emissions for the six days it was active by releasing 700,000 tonnes of carbon dioxide equivalent stored within the peatland.

In England firefighters returned to Ilkley Moor in West Yorkshire on the morning of 18 May after the area was set ablaze for the second time in the space of a month.
