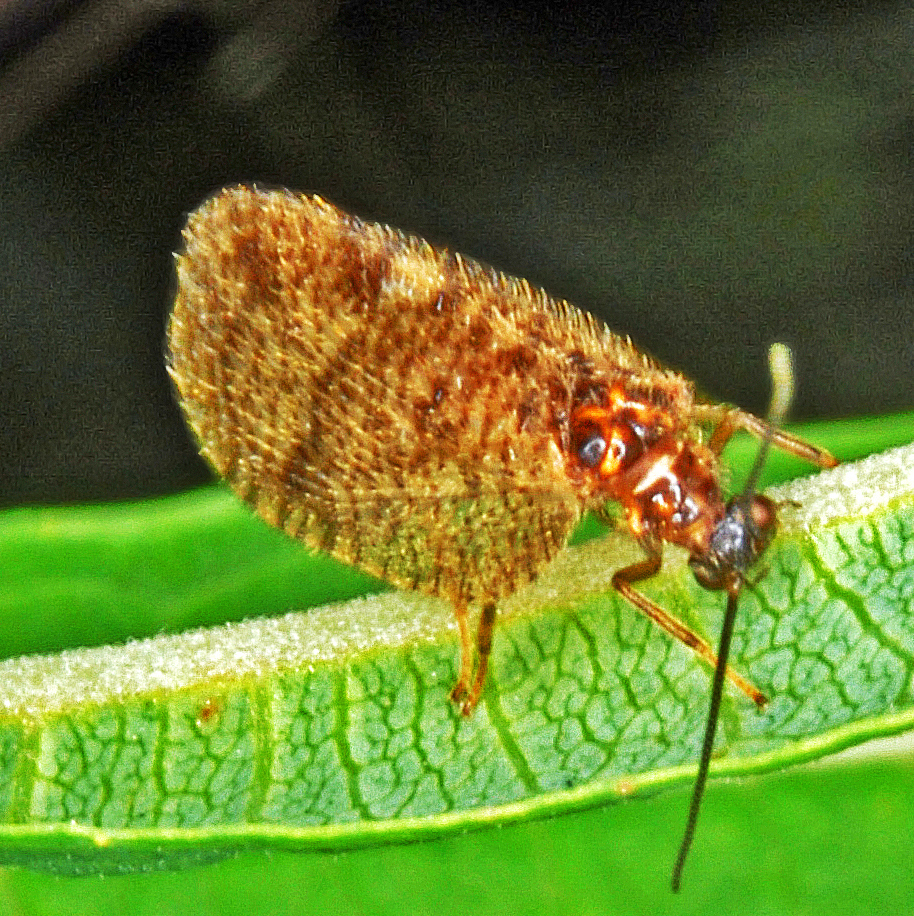
- Megalomus tortricoides (cf.).

Scientific classification
- Kingdom: Animalia
- Phylum: Arthropoda
- Class: Insecta
- Order: Neuroptera
- Family: Hemerobiidae
- Genus: Megalomus
- Species: M. tortricoides

Binomial name
- Megalomus tortricoides Rambur, 1842

Synonyms
- Drepanopteryx tortricoides (Rambur, 1842); Hemerobius tortricoides (Rambur, 1842); Megalomus tener Navás, 1915

= Megalomus tortricoides =

Species of lacewing

Megalomus tortricoides is a species of brown lacewing in the family Hemerobiidae. It was first described by Rambur in 1842.

== Distribution ==
This species is widespread in central and southern Europe.

== Habitat ==
These lacewings almost exclusively inhabit broad-leaved trees, especially Crataegus, Prunus and Berberis, but they can also be found in xerothermic forest edges with pines. They are present from sea level to mountain level.

== Description ==
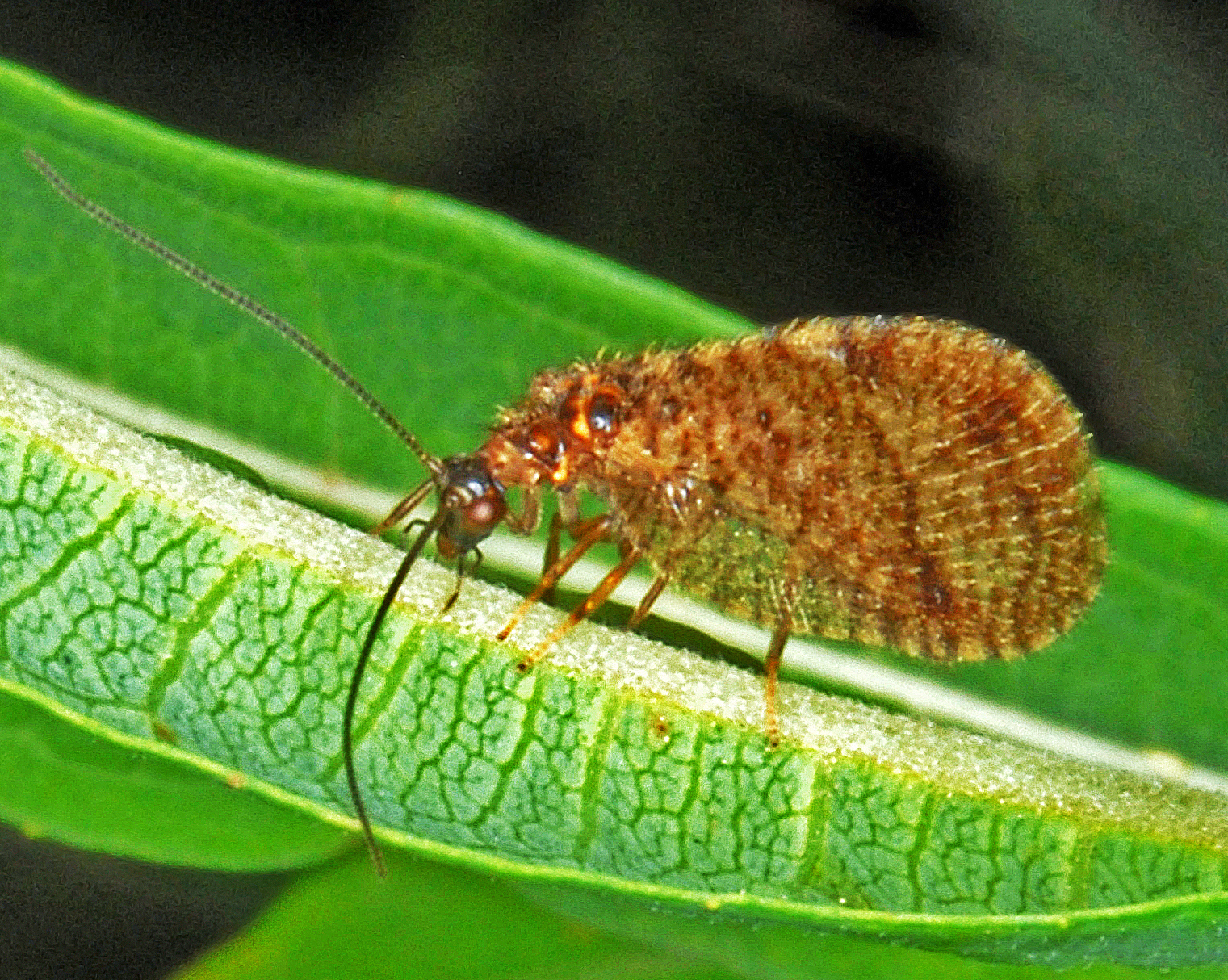
Side view

Megalomus tortricoides can reach a body length of approximately 5–7 millimetres (0.20–0.28 in), with a wingspan of 16–21 millimetres (0.63–0.83 in). In Megalomus tortricoides the head and the body are glossy, black or brown black. Antennae are mostly dark brown. The membrane of the forewings is distinctly spotted, a recurrent vein is present and the radial sector shows at least five ribs. Forewings have two fully formed rows of transverse rows.

This species is very similar to Megalomus hirtus, which is slightly smaller and shows a maculation of the front and back wings darker and more contrasted. The females can be separated only on the basis of tiny differences. In general these two species can only be distinguished on the basis of the shape of the 10th tergite of the males. In fact the tip of the abdomen of males have a dorsal hump on the ectoproct.

== Biology ==
Adults are in flight between April and October (these insects partly overwinter). Like their relatives, they are predominantly twilight and nocturnal. Adults mainly feed on aphids, tree sap and honeydew, whereas larvae are active predators on aphids and bark lice.

== Bibliography ==
- Aspöck H., Aspöck U. & Hölzel H. (1980) - Die Neuropteres Europas – Goecke & Evers, Krefeld
- Oswald J.D. (2018). LDL Neuropterida Species of the World (version Jul 2018). In: Roskov Y., Ower G., Orrell T., Nicolson D., Bailly N., Kirk P.M., Bourgoin T., DeWalt R.E., Decock W., De Wever A., Nieukerken E. van, Zarucchi J., Penev L., eds. (2018).
