= Megalomus moestus =

Scientific classification
- Domain: Eukaryota
- Kingdom: Animalia
- Phylum: Arthropoda
- Class: Insecta
- Order: Neuroptera
- Family: Hemerobiidae
- Genus: Megalomus
- Species: M. moestus

Binomial name
- Megalomus moestus Banks, 1895

Species of lacewing

Megalomus moestus is a species of brown lacewing in the family Hemerobiidae. It is found in Central America and North America.
