= Megalomus fidelis =

Scientific classification
- Domain: Eukaryota
- Kingdom: Animalia
- Phylum: Arthropoda
- Class: Insecta
- Order: Neuroptera
- Family: Hemerobiidae
- Genus: Megalomus
- Species: M. fidelis

Binomial name
- Megalomus fidelis (Banks, 1897)

Species of lacewing

Megalomus fidelis is a species of brown lacewing in the family Hemerobiidae. It is found in Central America and North America.
