= Dava Ramadhan =

Indonesian footballer

Personal information
- Full name: Dava Aldiansyah Ramadhan
- Date of birth: 12 April 2000 (age 26)
- Place of birth: Jakarta, Indonesia
- Height: 1.72 m (5 ft 8 in)
- Position: Defender

Youth career
- Bina Taruna
- 2019: Kalteng Putra
- 2019: Madura United

Senior career*
Years	Team	Apps	(Gls)
2020–2022	Persikabo 1973	1	(0)

International career
2014–2015	Indonesia U16	0	(0)
- * Club domestic league appearances and goals

Dava Aldiansyah Ramadhan (born 12 April 2000) is an Indonesian professional footballer who plays as a defender.

== Club career ==
=== TIRA-Persikabo ===
He was signed for TIRA-Persikabo to play in Liga 1 in the 2020 season. Dava made his league debut on 8 March 2020 in a match against PSS Sleman. This season was suspended on 27 March 2020 due to the COVID-19 pandemic. The season was abandoned and was declared void on 20 January 2021.

== Career statistics ==
=== Club ===
As of 15 March 2021.

Club	Season	League			Cup		Continental		Other		Total	
Club	Season	Division	Apps	Goals	Apps	Goals	Apps	Goals	Apps	Goals	Apps	Goals
Persikabo 1973	2020	Liga 1	1	0	0	0	–		0	0	1	0
Persikabo 1973	2021–22	Liga 1	0	0	0	0	–		3 (Note: Appearances in Menpora Cup.)	0	3	0
Career total			1	0	0	0	0	0	3	0	4	0
