= Barne Barton =

Coordinates: 50°23′48″N 4°11′18″W

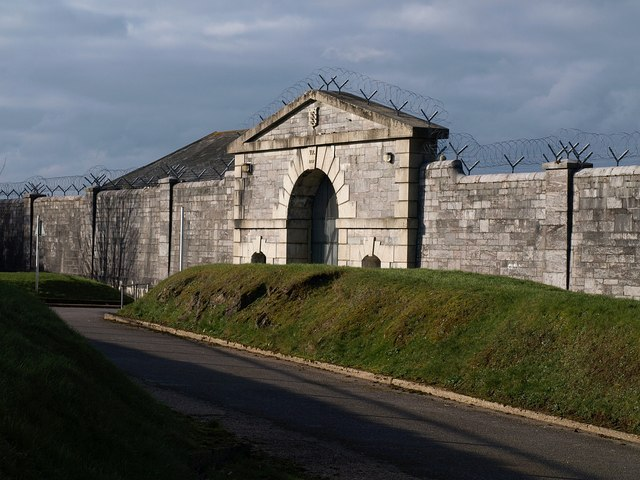
Bull Point Barracks

Barne Barton is an area within St Budeaux, Plymouth, Devon, England.

== Geography ==
Barne Barton is located to the North West of Plymouth about 2 miles by road, or 1 mile as the crow flies, from the Tamar Bridge. From the southern side of the hill, there are panoramic views of the River Tamar and Cornwall.

== History ==
Barne Barton in the sixteenth century was a farm (the words 'Barne Barton' actually mean 'Barne Farm') and produced essentials such as meat, wheat, grain and potatoes.

The area includes Bull Point Barracks which were built in the 1840s and 1850s to accommodate military personnel guarding the Bull Point Ordnance Depot. Emmeline Pankhurst, the suffragette, was arrested and taken to Bull Point Barracks in 1913.

In the 1960s Barne Barton became one of the largest naval estates within England providing accommodation for those serving in HMNB Devonport, Plymouth and on those warships stationed there. As the might of the Royal Navy reduced, so did the number of sailors. This reduction in manpower subsequently necessitated a reduction in the number of military married quarters required for serving personnel. As the size of the Navy continued to shrink, the first part of the military estate was sold by the MOD at a discounted purchase scheme to serving members of HM Forces with Naval Personnel given first priority and they ended up in private ownership. After further reduction in the size of the Royal Navy more properties were passed over initially to Plymouth City Council and then to Devon and Cornwall Housing Association. The MOD retained a number of houses which were refurbished by Annington Homes and were sold off to the general public. In July 2018 Clarion Housing Group submitted a planning application to redevelop the area with 200 new homes.

The demolition of parts of the estate began on 11 June 2020, with the aforementioned new homes replacing them.

== Schools ==
A new school, known as Riverside Primary School, which amalgamates both Barne Barton and Bull Point primary schools, opened in 2008.
