= 2025 Dava wildfire =

2025 wildfire in Scotland

2025 Dava wildfire - THE UK'S FIRST MEGAFIRE
- Part of the 2025 United Kingdom wildfires
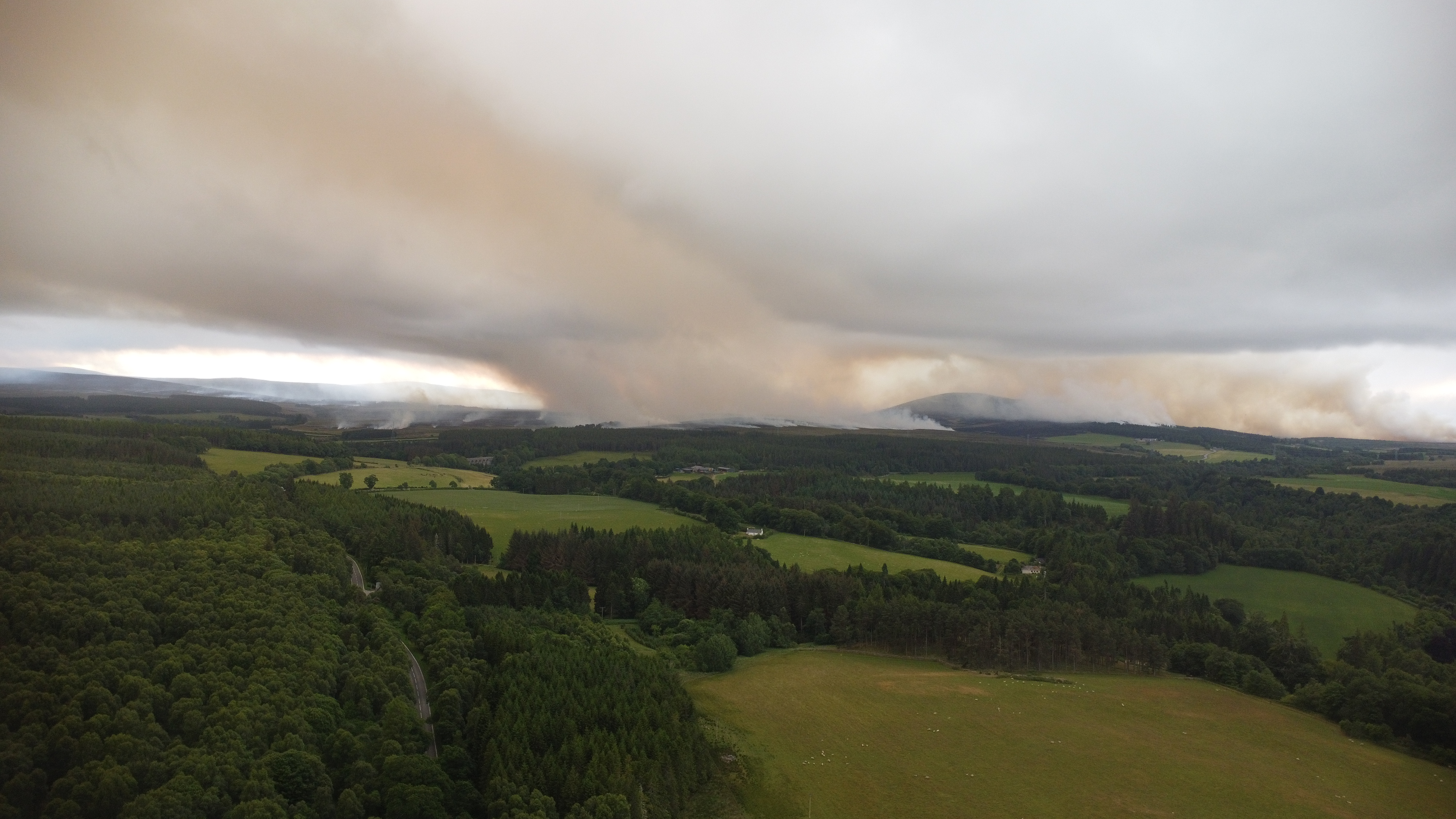
- Date: 28 June 2025
- Location: Dava, Scottish Highlands, Scotland
- Coordinates: 57.4°N 3.65°W

Map
- Location of the fire in the Scottish Highlands 2025 Dava wildfire (Scotland)

On 28 June 2025, a series of wildfires broke out in the Scottish Highlands around the area of Dava (near the town of Forres). The wildfire continued to spread for the coming days, with volunteers and fire crews assisting in the fire to be extinguished. On 30 June, heavy rainfall entered the region and assisted with extinguishing the fire. Scientists have designated the four-day fire as the first recorded megafire in the UK.

== Events ==
The fire had started from Loch Allan sometime before the afternoon of 28 June 2025, and after being ignited continued to spread eastward, turning into at least nine separate fires. At around 5pm emergency services were notified of the ongoing fire and were called to the scene. The roads in the area, including, but not limited to, the A939, B9007, B9012 and A940 were closed due to them crossing the path of the fire.

During the wildfire, volunteers, farmers, gamekeepers and other civilians assisted in extinguishing the fire. Residents of the area also brought food and supplies for the work effort.

On 29 June aerial firefighters began entering the scene, taking water from nearby lochs to douse the fire.

In the evening of 30 June, the smoke had blown into areas such as Forres, Nairn, Carrbridge, Grantown-on-Spey and Aviemore. During this, some of the sky had turned to a tinted yellow-ish colour. Later into the day, rainfall had approached from the west and had helped extinguish the fire.

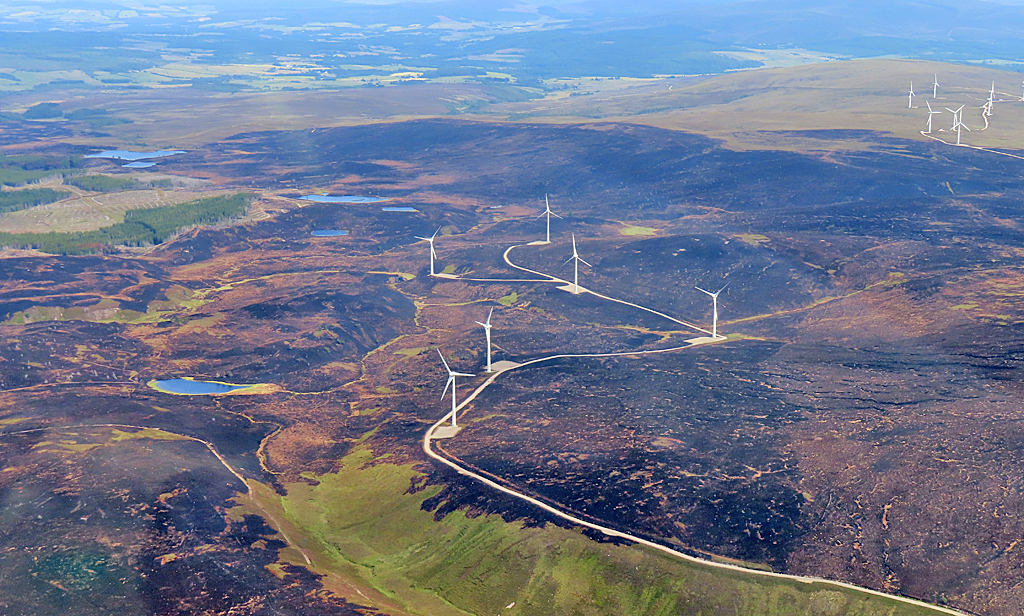
Aftermath of the wildfire

This event constituted Scotland's largest wildfire, "affecting approximately 11,827 hectares of moorland and woodland across the Carrbridge 5,234 hectares (12,930 acres) and Dava 6,593 hectares (16,290 acres) areas".
