= Taylor Complex Fire =

2004 wildfires in Alaska, United States

Coordinates: 63.3792°N 142.837°W

Taylor Complex Fire

The Taylor Complex Fire was a 2004 complex of 7 wildfire incidents in Alaska that consumed approximately 1,303,358 acres (5,275 km^{2}) of land, the largest of which was the Billy Creek Fire. By acreage, the complex was the largest wildfire in the United States between 1997 and 2007. The fire complex also was part of the record-breaking 2004 Alaska fire season that burned more than 6,600,000 acres (27,000 km^{2}), the most in recorded history. The complex was not declared out until November of that year.

== Fires ==
All of the fires below were a part of the Taylor Complex:

- Chicken #1
- Gardiner Creek
- Billy Creek
- Porcupine
- Mosquito Fork
- Wall Street
- Anomaly
