= Chapel Common =

Historical site

Coordinates: 51.050°N 0.833°W

- Site of Special Scientific Interest
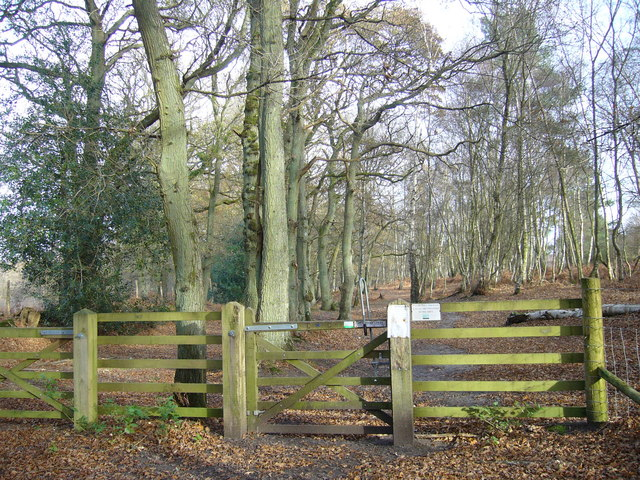
- Location of Chapel Common.
- Area of search: West Sussex
- Grid reference: SU 819 285
- Interest: Biological
- Area: 101.1 hectares (250 acres)
- Notification date: 1998
- Location map: Magic Map

Chapel Common is a 101-hectare (250-acre) biological Site of Special Scientific Interest west of Fernhurst in West Sussex. A Roman road through the common is a Scheduled Monument.

Most of the common is dry heathland but there are also areas of woodland, grassland and scrub. Heathland birds include three internationally important species listed on Annex I of the EU Birds Directive, woodlark, nightjar and Dartford warbler. The site also has rare and scarce invertebrates.

Several public footpaths cross the common.
