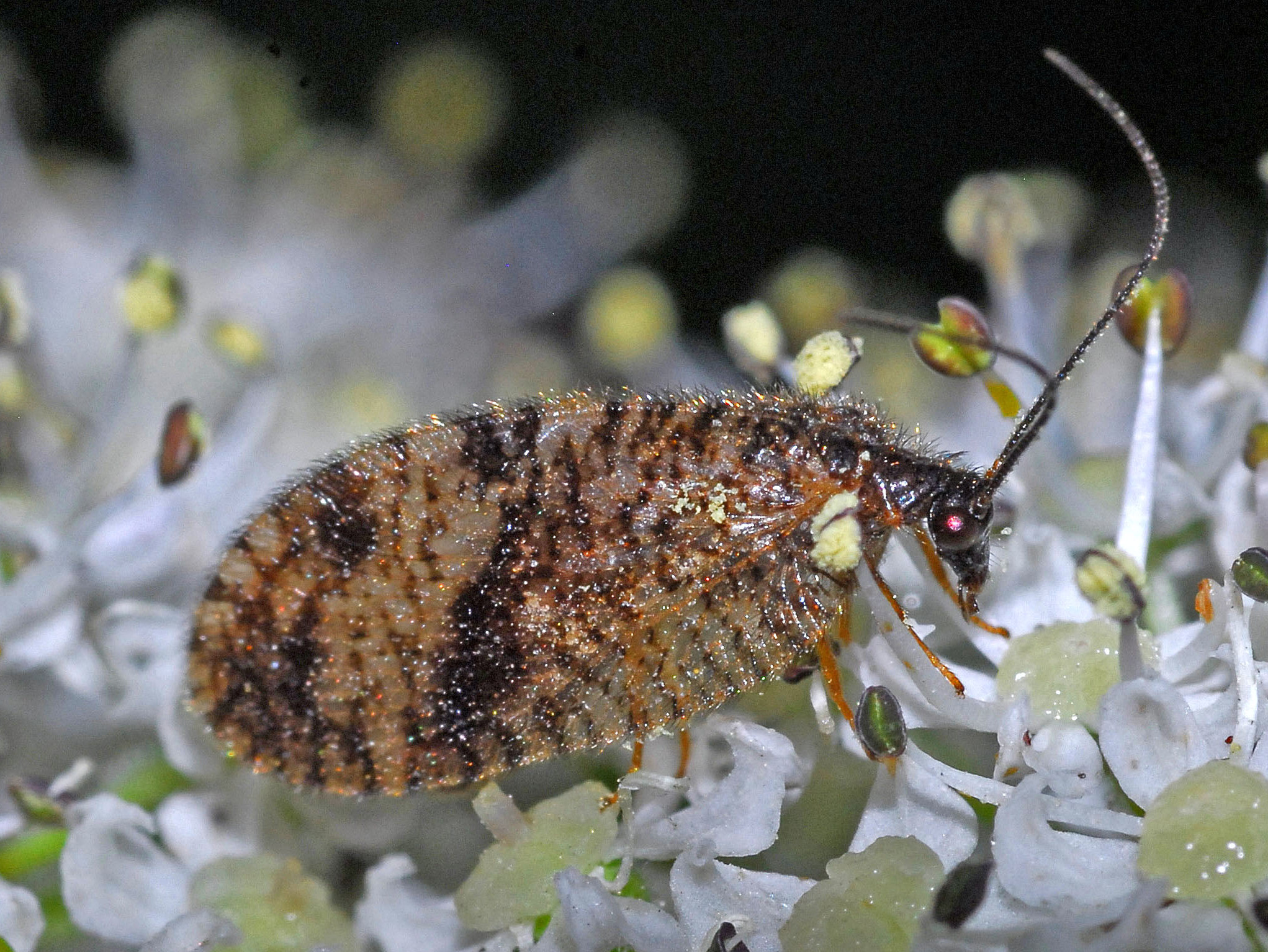
- Adult of Megalomus hirtus

Scientific classification
- Kingdom: Animalia
- Phylum: Arthropoda
- Class: Insecta
- Order: Neuroptera
- Family: Hemerobiidae
- Genus: Megalomus
- Species: M. hirtus

Binomial name
- Megalomus hirtus (Linnaeus, 1761)

Synonyms
- Hemerobius alpinus Hagen, 1866; Hemerobius decussatus Samouelle, 1819; Hemerobius fimbriatus Curtis, 1828; Hemerobius hirtus Linnaeus, 1761; Hemerobius ornatus Hagen, 1866; Hemerobius undulatus Hagen, 1866; Megalomus hirtus oropaeus Navás, 1929

= Megalomus hirtus =

Species of lacewing

Megalomus hirtus, common name bordered brown lacewing, is a species of brown lacewings in the family Hemerobiidae.

== Distribution ==
This species is widespread in Northern and Central Europe. In the United Kingdom it has a very restricted distribution.

== Habitat ==
These lacewings preferably inhabit hot meadows and the forest edges with broad-leaved trees and some shrubs.

== Description ==
Megalomus hirtus has a wingspan of the front wings barely exceeding 8 millimetres (0.31 in). Usually it reaches a wingspan of 6.5–8.5 millimetres (0.26–0.33 in). In these brown lacewings the radial sector of the fore wings shows at least five ribs, preferably six or seven. Moreover, the front and hind wings are rather dark, with well contrasted brown speckling and cross bands. The head and the body are glossy, black or brown black. Antennae are mostly dark brown. At rest, they may be kept between the wings and the legs. The body shows the same color as the head, but the first part is usually slightly brownish. The body and the wings are quite hairy.

This species is rather similar to Megalomus tortricoides, that is slightly bigger, with a maculation of the front and back wings clear and only slightly contrasted. Moreover, the females can be separated only on the basis of tiny differences.

== Biology ==
Adults fly from June to August. The eggs are usually laid on the underside of leaves. After about four weeks the mature larvae spins a candy cocoon. This species is overwintering as a pupa. It has one or two generations a year. Megalomus hirtus is linked almost exclusively to broad-leaved trees, with a preference for Corylus species. In UK it should have some kind of association with wood sage (Teucrium scorodonia), that usually grows on rocky slopes. The larvae are active predators on aphids or on the larvae of other small insects that have wood sage as host plant.

== Bibliography ==
- Aspöck H., Aspöck U. & Hölzel H. (1980) - Die Neuropteres Europas – Goecke & Evers, Krefeld
- Kimmins, D. E. 1935 Notes on the genera Megalomus Rambur and Nesobiella, gen. nov. (Neuroptera), with descriptions of new species. Annals and Magazine of Natural History (10)16:602-619
- Linnaeus, C. 1761. Fauna Svecica, sistens animalia Sveciae regni: Mammalia, Aves, Amphibia, Pices, Insecta, Vermes distributa per classes & ordines, genera & species, cum differentiis specierum, synonymis auctorum, nominibus natalium, descriptionibus insectorum. Laurentii Salvii, Stockholm
- McLachlan, R. 1868 A monograph of the British Neuroptera-Planipennia. Transactions of the Royal Entomological Society of London
- Monserrat, V. J. 2004. Nuevos datos sobre algunas especies de hemeróbidos (Insecta: Neuroptera: Hemerobiidae). Heteropterus : Revista de Entomología 4:1-26. [
- Navás, L. (1929) Insetti Neurotteri ed affini di Oropa (Biella)., Bollettino della Società Entomologica Italiana 61:44-47.
- Oswald J.D. (2018). LDL Neuropterida Species of the World (version Jul 2018). In: Roskov Y., Ower G., Orrell T., Nicolson D., Bailly N., Kirk P.M., Bourgoin T., DeWalt R.E., Decock W., De Wever A., Nieukerken E. van, Zarucchi J., Penev L., eds. (2018).
