= Marsden Moor Estate =

Moorland in the South Pennines, England

Coordinates: 53.601°N 1.960°W

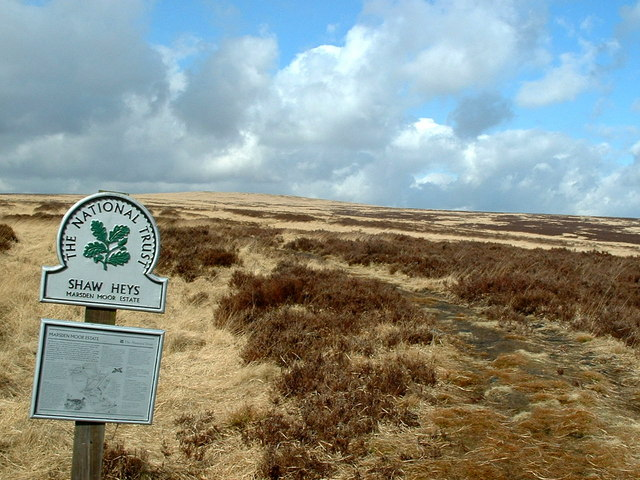
Marsden Moor Estate

The Marsden Moor Estate is a large expanse of moorland in the South Pennines, between the conurbations of West Yorkshire and Greater Manchester in the north of England. It is named after the adjacent town of Marsden, and is owned and administered by the National Trust to whom it was conveyed in 1955 by the Radcliffe family in lieu of death duties.

The estate covers 2,429 ha (5,685 acres) of unenclosed common moorland and almost surrounds Marsden. Part of it is in the most northern section of the Peak District National Park. The landscape is made up of moorland, valleys, peaks and crags and has long been modified by man. Marsden is at the eastern gateway to the important ancient Standedge crossing of the moors and evidence of transport related archaeological remains dating from pre-Roman times have been discovered close to the great engineering structures of the canal and railway ages. The moors have been a water catchment area since the Victorian era when several reservoirs were built, along with their associated catchwaters in the Wessenden Valley. The Pennine Way and the Peak District Boundary Walk run across the moors (following the same route between Wessenden and Redbrook Reservoirs.

The landscape supports large numbers of moorland birds such as the golden plover, red grouse, Eurasian curlew and twite. The estate, a designated Site of Special Scientific Interest, forms part of a Special Protection Area and is a candidate Special Area of Conservation.

The estate is managed from a base in the old goods yard, adjacent to Marsden railway station, and the old goods shed has been converted into a public exhibition, entitled Welcome to Marsden, which gives an overview of the estate and its history.

The moor has been affected by fires. Dozens of firefighters were required to put out a blaze in 2011. A fire in February 2019, during an unseasonal spell of warm weather, was described by West Yorkshire Fire and Rescue Service as one of the biggest moorland fires it had ever had to deal with.
