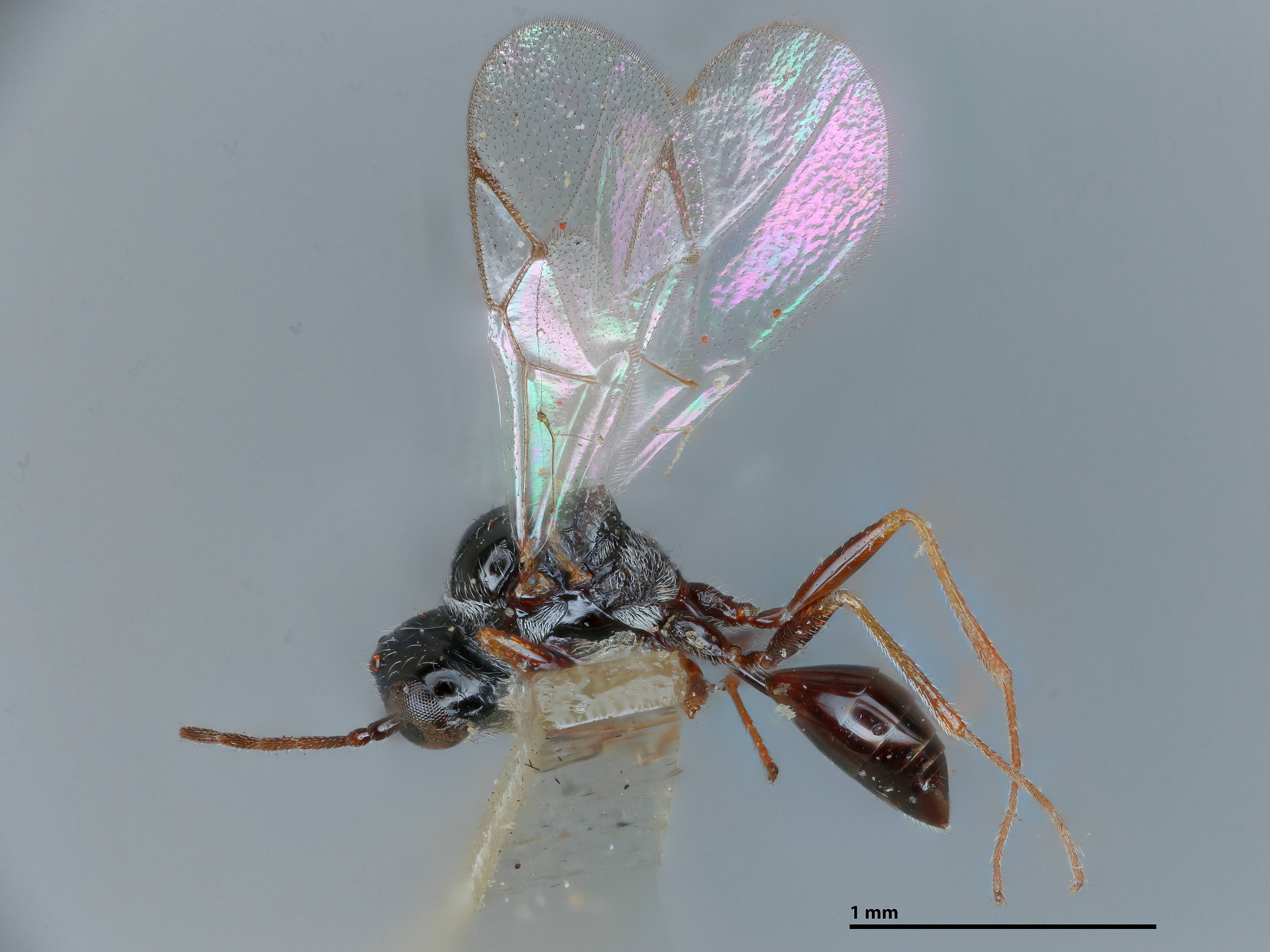
- Image of full body of Anacharis zealandica.

Scientific classification
- Kingdom: Animalia
- Phylum: Arthropoda
- Clade: Pancrustacea
- Class: Insecta
- Order: Hymenoptera
- Family: Figitidae
- Genus: Anacharis
- Species: A. zealandica

Binomial name
- Anacharis zealandica (Gray in Yate, 1835)

= Anacharis zealandica =

Species of wasp

Anacharis zealandica, commonly known as the lacewing parasitoid wasp, is a New Zealand wasp that parasitises lacewings like Micromus tasmaniae and Drepanacra binocula.

== Description ==
Anacharis zealandica pair of eyes are on the sides of its head for optimal peripheral vision to see both prey and predator coming from all directions. This eye structure is discoverable in all wasp species as well as Diptera. The body of Anacharis zealandica has a glossy, shiny look. The legs are a lighter shade of brown than the body. Both Anacharis zealandica pair of wings are transparent, scaly, and thin, with one pair being larger than the other. The size of an adult Anacharis zealandica is often around 5mm long. Adult Anacharis zealandica have a head width of roughly 0.5mm. Many Hymenoptera including Anacharis zealandica use the hairs on their body to enhance their smell and taste senses. Anacharis zealandica has a thin waist (petiole) that connects its abdomen and thorax. Anacharis zealandica has 3 pairs of jointed legs and a pair of jointed antennae. Anacharis zealandica is a rare species to find due to its size so I could not find any information on larvae identification.

== Geographic distribution ==
Anacharis zealandica is native to New Zealand. In the North Island of New Zealand, Anacharis zealandica has been found in Bay of Plenty, Coromandel, Hawke's Bay, Auckland, Taranaki, Taupo, Whanganui, Northland, Waikato, and Wellington. In the South Island, Anacharis zealandica has been found in Central Otago, Dunedin, Kaikoura, Buller, Mid Canterbury, Mackenzie, Nelson, Marlborough, South Canterbury, Marlborough Sounds, Southland, Westland, and Otago Lakes. Anacharis zealandica has also been found throughout Australia. In Australia, Anacharis zealandica has been found in South Australia, Queensland, New South Wales, the Australian Capital Territory, Tasmania, Victoria, and Western Australia. The only part of Australia in which Anacharis zealandica has not been found is the Northern Territory. Anacharis zealandica has also been found on Kermadec Islands, Snares Islands, Three Kings Islands, and Chatham Islands, all off the coast of New Zealand.

== Habitat ==
The preferred habitat of Anacharis zealandica as a larva is the brown lacewing Micromus tasmaniae which is why the common name of Anacharis zealandica is lacewing parasitoid wasp. Micromus tasmaniae has enough energy to host Anacharis zealandica so Anacharis zealandica can harvest the energy to feed off the lacewing as a larva. Micromus tasmaniae prefers habitats with temperate weather conditions which are conditions Anacharis zealandica has adapted to since it needs Micromus tasmaniae to survive. Micromus tasmaniae does not like hotter climates. When individuals of Anacharis zealandica are larvae, Micromus tasmaniae is large enough to host Anacharis zealandica and keep both species alive. Micromus tasmaniae prefers lowland shrubs and bush with not too high canopy cover. As an adult, Anacharis zealandica prefers slightly cooler temperatures and areas with less high canopy cover. Fagopyrum esculentum is another preferred habitat of Anacharis zealandica due to the floral assets the buckwheat flower can provide to Anacharis zealandica and its host.

== Life cycle and phenology ==
Anacharis zealandica starts its life cycle as an egg within Micromus tasmaniae. Anacharis zealandica stays as an egg for roughly 4-10 days. These eggs hatch into larva, living as a parasitoid of Micromus tasmaniae with the focus of feeding on the host. Anacharis zealandica are larva for roughly 13-17 days. Anacharis zealandica then become pupa for roughly 7-19 days until the individual then turns into an independent adult. Anacharis zealandica live the rest of their life as an adult for roughly 2-3 weeks. The reason for the variation of longevity in each part of the life cycle is due to habitat variation and living conditions. As an adult, Anacharis zealandica feeds on nectar from flowers such as Fagopyrum esculentum. This defines Anacharis zealandica as a life-history omnivore. Buckwheat consumption contributes to a longer lifespan of adult Anacharis zealandica.

== Diet, prey and predators ==
Two preferred food sources of Anacharis zealandica are the buckwheat flower because of its nectar and Acyrthosiphon pisum aphids. Honeydew is another food source consumed by Anacharis zealandica. Micromus tasmaniae is another food source of Anacharis zealandica since it is the host of the parasitoid that uses the hosts energy. Anacharis zealandica prefers food high in sugar levels.

Anacharis zealandica is situated at the fourth trophic level, meaning it is a top predator. Since Anacharis zealandica is part of the fourth trophic level, it is not in much danger of predator competition. This is common for many parasites. Species that are on the fourth trophic level such as Anacharis zealandica are not often parasitised as they are in the tertiary consumer level. Parasitoids are quite prone to diseases. This is because the host of parasitoids can adapt over time to release toxins and poisons that can potentially make the parasitoid sick and contract a disease. Occasionally host organisms will need to do this because the parasitoid poses too much of a threat to the host.

Abundance of Micromus tasmaniae decreases when there are high numbers of Anacharis zealandica. This is because the parasitoid Anacharis zealandica can make the brown lacewing sick and weak by harvesting the hosts energy. This decrease in abundance of Micromus tasmaniae has a follow-on effect of aphid populations in the nearby area increasing since they are a food source for Micromus tasmaniae. Anacharis zealandica is an endoparasitoid and has picked its host well because aphids that are a food source for Micromus tasmaniae are also a food source for Anacharis zealandica.

== Other information ==
Anacharis zealandica has an attraction to methyl salicylate, a compound that plants create to keep herbivores from eating the leaves.
