= Ganaspis kimorum =

Scientific classification
- Kingdom: Animalia
- Phylum: Arthropoda
- Clade: Pancrustacea
- Class: Insecta
- Order: Hymenoptera
- Family: Figitidae
- Genus: Ganaspis
- Species: G. kimorum

Binomial name
- Ganaspis kimorum Buffington et al., 2024

Species of insect

Ganaspis kimorum, is a species of parasitoid wasp belonging to the family Figitidae, that has been permitted for release in the United States for biocontrol of Drosophila suzukii. This endoparasitoid lays its eggs inside early larval instars of D. suzukii, and emerge out of the pupae after about a month. Ganaspis kimorum tend to parasitize D. suzukii in smaller fruit, when compared to the related parasitoid Leptopilina japonica, likely due to its smaller ovipositor.

Ganaspis kimorum was formerly known as Ganaspis brasiliensis G1 strain, and was formally described and split from G. brasiliensis, along with G. lupini (formerly G. brasiliensis G3) due to being a species complex.
