= Cicatrix =

Scientific classification
- Kingdom: Animalia
- Phylum: Arthropoda
- Clade: Pancrustacea
- Class: Insecta
- Order: Hymenoptera
- Family: Figitidae
- Subfamily: Thrasorinae
- Genus: Cicatrix; Paretas-Martínez, 2011

Type species
- Amblynotus pilosiscutum Girault, 1929

Genus of wasps

Cicatrix is a genus of wasp found in Australia. It was erected in 2011 following a revision of Mikeius.

== Species ==
There are three recognized species:

- Cicatrix pilosiscutum (Girault, 1929)
- Cicatrix neumanoides Paretas-Martínez & Restrepo-Ortiz, 2011
- Cicatrix schauffi (Girault, 1929)
