= Stentorceps weedlei =

Scientific classification
- Kingdom: Animalia
- Phylum: Arthropoda
- Class: Insecta
- Order: Hymenoptera
- Family: Figitidae
- Genus: Stentorceps
- Species: S. weedlei

Binomial name
- Stentorceps weedlei Nielsen & Buffington, 2011

Species of wasp

Stentorceps weedlei is a species of parasitoid wasp in the family Figitidae found in Madagascar.

== Etymology ==
The specific epithet "weedlei" refers to the Pokémon character Weedle. The name was chosen because both the wasp and the Pokémon possess a distinctive spine or horn on the head, a key diagnostic feature of the species.

== Taxonomy ==
The species was described by M. Nielsen and M.L. Buffington in 2011 as part of a revision of the genus Stentorceps.

Within the genus, S. weedlei is most similar to S. zuparkoi but can be distinguished by the presence of a small spine immediately dorsal to the medial protuberance of the clypeus, and by its broad pyriform protuberances (vs. thin in S. zuparkoi).

== Description ==
The description is based on the female holotype. The species is diagnosed by the unique small spine located dorsal to the medial protuberance of the clypeus. Other morphological details are consistent with the genus Stentorceps, which is characterized by a heavily sculptured and modified mesosoma.

== Distribution and habitat ==
The species is known only from the type locality: Vohiparara, within Ranomafana National Park, Fianarantsoa Province, Madagascar. The specimen was collected in a high-altitude rainforest at 1,100 meters elevation using a Malaise trap between October and November 2001.
