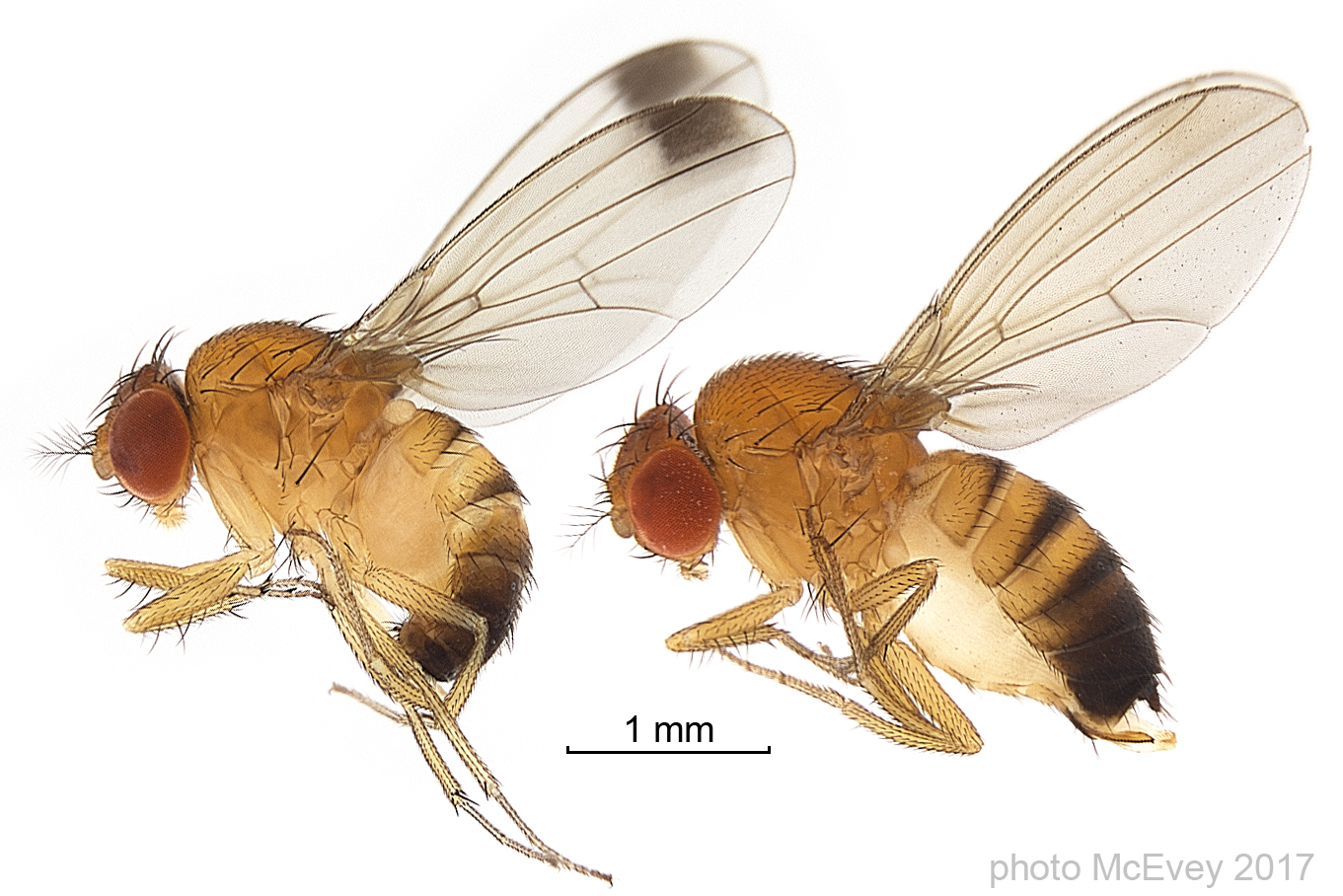
- Male and female

Scientific classification
- Kingdom: Animalia
- Phylum: Arthropoda
- Clade: Pancrustacea
- Class: Insecta
- Order: Diptera
- Family: Drosophilidae
- Genus: Drosophila
- Subgenus: Sophophora
- Species group: melanogaster
- Species subgroup: suzukii
- Species: D. suzukii

Binomial name
- Drosophila suzukii (Matsumura, 1931)

= Drosophila suzukii =

Species of fly

Drosophila suzukii, commonly called the spotted wing drosophila or SWD, is a fruit fly. D. suzukii, originally from southeast Asia, is becoming a major pest species in America and Europe because it infests fruit early during the ripening stage, in contrast with other Drosophila species that infest only rotting fruit.

Native to east Asia, D. suzukii was first described in 1931 by Shōnen Matsumura, it was observed in Japan as early as 1916 by T. Kanzawa.

D. suzukii is a fruit crop pest and is a serious economic threat to soft summer fruit, i.e., cherries, blueberries, raspberries, blackberries, peaches, nectarines, apricots, grapes, and others. Research investigating the specific threat D. suzukii poses to these fruit is ongoing.

== Description ==
Like other members of the Drosophilidae, D. suzukii is small, approximately 2 to 3.5 millimetres (5/64 to 9/64 in) in length and 5 to 6.5 millimetres (13/64 to 1/4 in) in wingspan and looks like its fruit and vinegar fly relatives. Its body is yellow to brown with darker bands on the abdomen and it has red eyes. The male has a distinct dark spot near the tip of each wing; females do not have the spotted wing. The foreleg of the male sports dark bands on the first and second tarsi. The female has a long, sharp, serrated ovipositor. The larvae are small, white, and cylindrical reaching 3.5 millimetres (9/64 in) in length.

When first observed in a new region, D. suzukii has often been confused with the western cherry fruit fly (Rhagoletis indifferens) and was given the short-lasting name cherry vinegar fly. The cherry fruit fly is significantly larger than D. suzukii (up to 5 millimetres (13/64 in)) and has a pattern of dark bands on its wings instead of the telltale spot of D. suzukii. The telltale spots on the wings of male D. suzukii have earned it the common name "spotted wing drosophila" (SWD).

Unlike its vinegar fly relatives, which are primarily attracted to rotting or fermented fruit, female D. suzukii attack fresh, ripe fruit by using their saw-like ovipositor to lay eggs under the fruit's soft skin. The larvae hatch and grow in the fruit, destroying the fruit's commercial value. Economic impacts are significant; losses from large scale infestation (20% loss) across the US alone could equate to farm gate impacts > $500M.

D. suzukii has a slow rate of evolution due to its lower number of generations per year, because it enters winter diapause.

== Distribution ==
Native to southeast Asia, D. suzukii was first described in 1931 by Matsumura. Observed in Japan as early as 1916 by T. Kanzawa, it was widely observed throughout parts of Japan, Korea, and China by the early 1930s. By the 1980s, the "fruit fly" with the spotted wings was seen in Hawaii. It first appeared in North America in central California in August 2008, then was found in Oregon and Washington State by Lee et al., 2011 in the Pacific Northwest in 2009, and is now widespread throughout California's coastal counties, western Oregon, western Washington, and parts of British Columbia and Florida. During the summer of 2010 the fly was discovered for the first time in South Carolina, North Carolina, Louisiana, and Utah. In Fall 2010 the fly was also discovered in Michigan and Wisconsin. The fly was first discovered in the northeastern states in 2011 and in Minnesota and Idaho in 2012. As D. suzukii continues to spread, most US states and Canadian provinces will most likely observe it. The pest has also been found in Europe, including the countries of Belgium, Italy, France, Netherlands, and Spain.

== Lifecycle ==
The lifespan of D. suzukii varies greatly between generations; from a few weeks to ten months. Generations hatched early in the year have shorter lifespans than generations hatched after September. Research shows that many of the males and most of the females of the late-hatching generations overwinter in captivity—some living as long as 300 days. Only adults overwinter successfully in the research conducted thus far. In Washington state, D. suzukii has been observed in association with two exotic and well-established species of blackberry, Rubus armeniacus (= Rubus discolor) and Rubus laciniatus (the Himalayan and Evergreen Blackberries, respectively.). The fly has been observed reproducing on many other species of soft-skinned wild fruit, however, research is still ongoing to determine the quality of individual species as reproductive hosts.

Adults emerge from overwintering when temperatures reach approximately 10 °C (50 °F) (and 268 degree days). The fertilized female searches for ripe fruit, lands on the fruit, inserts its serrated ovipositor to pierce the skin and deposits a clutch of 1 to 3 eggs per insertion. Females will oviposit on many fruits and in regions of scarce fruit, many females will oviposit on the same fruit. In captivity in Japan, research shows up to 13 generations of D. suzukii may hatch per season. A female may lay as many as 300 eggs during its lifespan. With as many as 13 generations per season, and the ability for the female to lay up to 300 eggs each, the potential population size of D. suzukii is huge. It is also important to note that males of D. suzukii become sterile at 30 °C (86 °F) and population size may be limited in regions that reach that temperature.

The larvae grow inside the fruit. The oviposition site is visible in many fruit by a small pore scar in the skin of the fruit often called a "sting". After 1 or 2 days, the area around the "sting" softens and depresses creating an increasingly visible blemish. The depressions may also exude fluid which may attract infection by secondary bacterial and fungal pathogens. Larvae may leave the fruit, or remain inside it, to pupate.

== Economic impact ==
The economic impact of D. suzukii on fruit crops is negative and significantly affects a wide variety of summer fruit in the United States including cherries, blueberries, grapes, nectarines, pears, plums, pluots, peaches, raspberries, and strawberries, and blackberries. D. suzukii was also found in apples in Europe. Damage was first noticed in North America in the western states of California, Oregon, and Washington in 2008; yield loss estimates from that year vary widely, with negligible loss in some areas to 80% loss in others depending on location and crop. The $500 million actual loss due to pest damage in 2008—the first year D. suzukii was observed in California—is an indication of the potential damage the pest can cause upon introduction to a new location. Economic losses have now been reported across North America and in Europe as the fly has spread to new areas. In 2015 it is estimated that national economic loss for producers in the United States was $700 million. Future losses may decrease as growers learn how to better control the pest, or may keep increasing as the fly continues to spread.

== Agricultural management ==
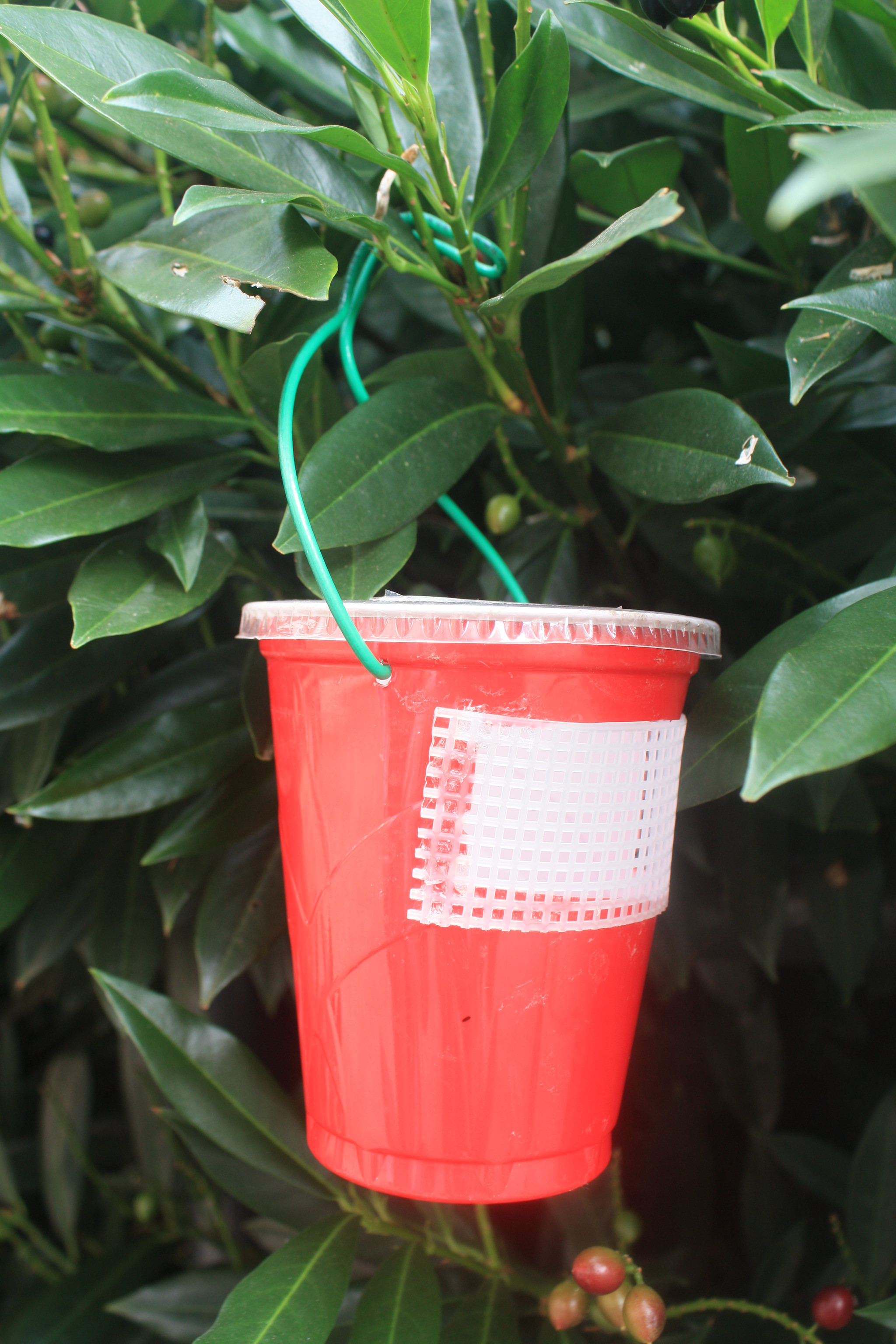
Red plastic cup used as a homemade trap for monitoring

Due to the impact of D. suzukii on soft fruits, farmers have started to monitor and control it. There are different types of traps, both commercial and home-made, that are effective in monitoring it. Traps that use apple cider vinegar with a bait made of whole wheat dough have been successful for farmers for both capture and monitoring. Farmers are advised to place these traps in a shaded area as soon as the first fruit is set and to not remove them until the end of harvest. The traps should be checked once a week and farmers should look for the spot on the wing of the males to determine if D. suzukii is present.

In areas where D. suzukii has already been established or where its activity has been monitored, there are different ways to control it. One way to manage D. suzukii is to remove the infested fruit and place it in a plastic bag in the garbage. This method is effective from removing D. suzukii from gardens and small areas but is difficult for farmers with larger operations to do this. Farmers can also harvest their soft fruit early which reduces the exposure of fruit to D. suzukii and the likelihood of damage.

Farmers have the option of both conventional and organic sprays to control D. suzukii. Timing of the sprays is important to effectively controlling it. Since D. suzukii is more active in the morning and evening those are the best times to control it. Sprays should be in place prior to egg laying and the coverage needs to be thorough because adults often hide in dense portion of the canopy. Depending on the variety of soft fruit and laws in different states and countries, there are many types of organic and conventional sprays that are effective. Different laws and pre-harvest date intervals need to be kept in mind when choosing a type of spray. Most types of sprays need to be applied each week, at a minimum. To prevent resistance to certain sprays, farmers must rotate among different insecticides.

The use of organically based attract and kill stations placed within soft berry plantings show promise in reducing SWD infestations. University studies employed 3" poly net disks, layered in super absorbent polymer, red raspberry concentrate, apple cider vinegar and brewers yeast, employing 1% Boric Acid as the toxicant and spaced at 18" along the exterior rows of plants providing over 60% reduction of infestation by SWD in berries.

=== Parasitoids ===
- Ganaspis - The United States Department of Agriculture's Animal and Plant Health Inspection Service has approved and the biocontrol committee of the North American Plant Protection Organization has recommended the use of Ganaspis brasiliensis as a biocontrol for D. suzukii. G. brasiliensis has been widely studied by others as a potential biocontrol for D. suzukii. (However, there is some dispute as to whether it is G. brasiliensis that attacks D. suzukii or whether this is the D. suzukii-specialized host race of Ganaspis xanthopoda.)
- Asobara
  - A. brevicauda
  - A. elongata
  - A. japonica, the most common in South Korea
  - A. leveri
  - A. mesocauda
  - A. triangulata
  - A. unicolorata
- Leptopilina
  - L. decemflagella
  - L. j. formosana
  - L. japonica - First captured in November 2020 as bycatch from a Vespa mandarinia trap in Washington State - the first find of this species in the United States. This may help to control D. suzukii in North America.
  - L. j. japonica
  - Unspecified Leptopilina likely a sp. nov. by Buffington.
- Leptolamina spp.
- Unspecified new Figitidae genus related to Leptolamina
- Pachycrepoideus vindemiae
- Trichopria drosophilae
- Areotetes striatiferus, Yunnan Province, China
- Tanycarpa chors, Japan, two locations in China

=== Genetic engineering ===
There is ongoing research into population control methods using gene editing. Since 2017, biotechnology startup Agragene has been developing an approach that uses CRISPR on fly embryos to knock out two genes—one that sterilizes male flies, the other which prevents the females from hatching. Once hatched, the male flies would be released to mate with wild females, who would then lay sterile eggs. The company estimates releasing four to five sterile males to every one wild male per generation would be necessary to control a population. Because of the species' short lifespan, multiple weekly releases per season could be required for an effective deterrent. In May 2023, USDA and company researchers began greenhouse testing of the technique with the aim of deploying field tests in 2024.

Researchers at North Carolina State University have been developing a technique that also uses CRISPR to modify a gene essential to female sexual development that renders them unable to lay eggs. The male flies, however, remain fertile and pass the mutated gene to future generations when they mate with unmodified females. This has the potential benefit of not requiring multiple releases like the Agragene method does. The researchers estimate that a release of one modified fly to every four wild flies would control populations within 10 generations, or about 20 weeks.

== Predators ==
Predators of this species include earwigs, damsel bugs, spiders, ants, and Orius ("minute pirate bugs") especially O. insidiosus. Other likely predators are ground beetles (Carabidae), crickets, green lacewings' larvae, rove beetles (Staphylinidae) especially Dalotia coriaria, birds, and mammals.

== Microbiome ==
Drosophila suzukii, like all insects, is host to a variety of microorganisms. The intestinal bacterial communities of adult and larval D. suzukii collected in its invasive range (USA), were found to be simple and mostly dominated by Tatumella spp. (Enterobacteriaceae). This fly is also infected with a variety of viruses in the wild. Whilst sharing some natural viruses with its close relative D. melanogaster, D. suzukii also harbours a number of unique viruses specific to it alone. Yeasts also form an important part of the Drosophila microbiome, with a mutualistic relationships to yeast being described in other Drosophila species. The yeast species found to be most frequently associated with D. suzukii were Hanseniaspora uvarum, Metschnikowia pulcherrima, Pichia terricola, and P. kluyveri. Although certain fungal pathogens have been shown to experimentally infect D. suzukii, the wild fungal infections of D. suzukii remain to be explored comprehensively.

== Gallery ==
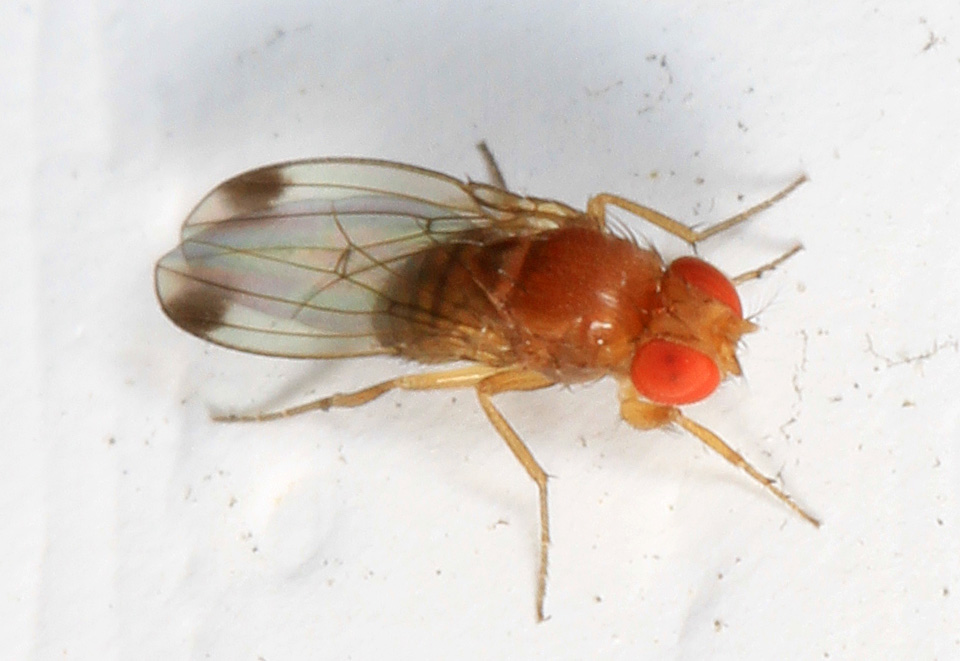
Male, note the dark spots near his wing tips

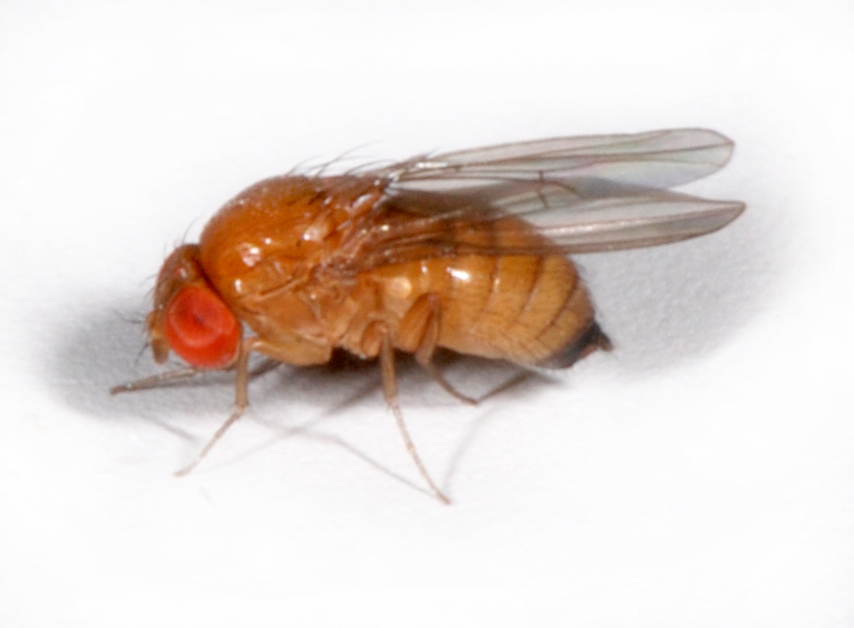
Female, her wings are without spots

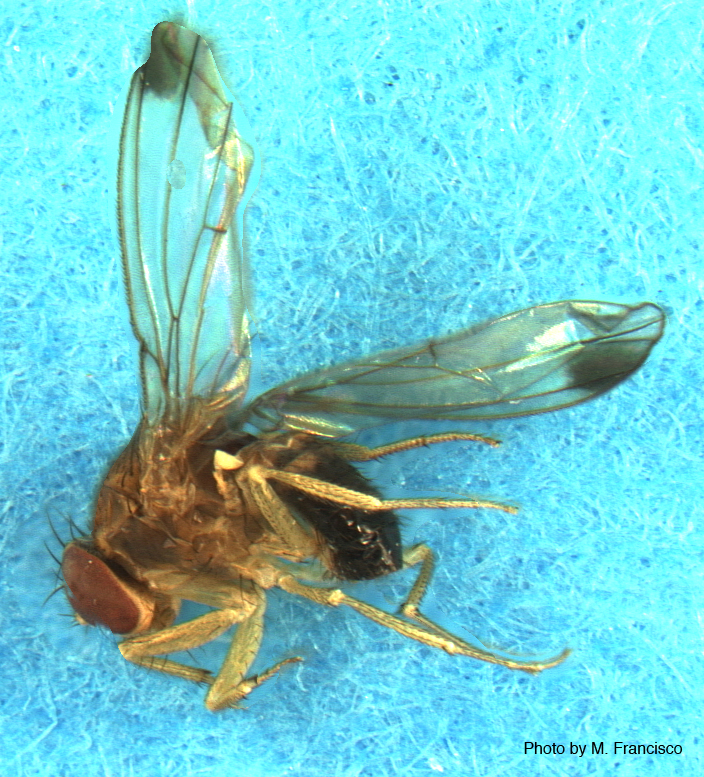
Male

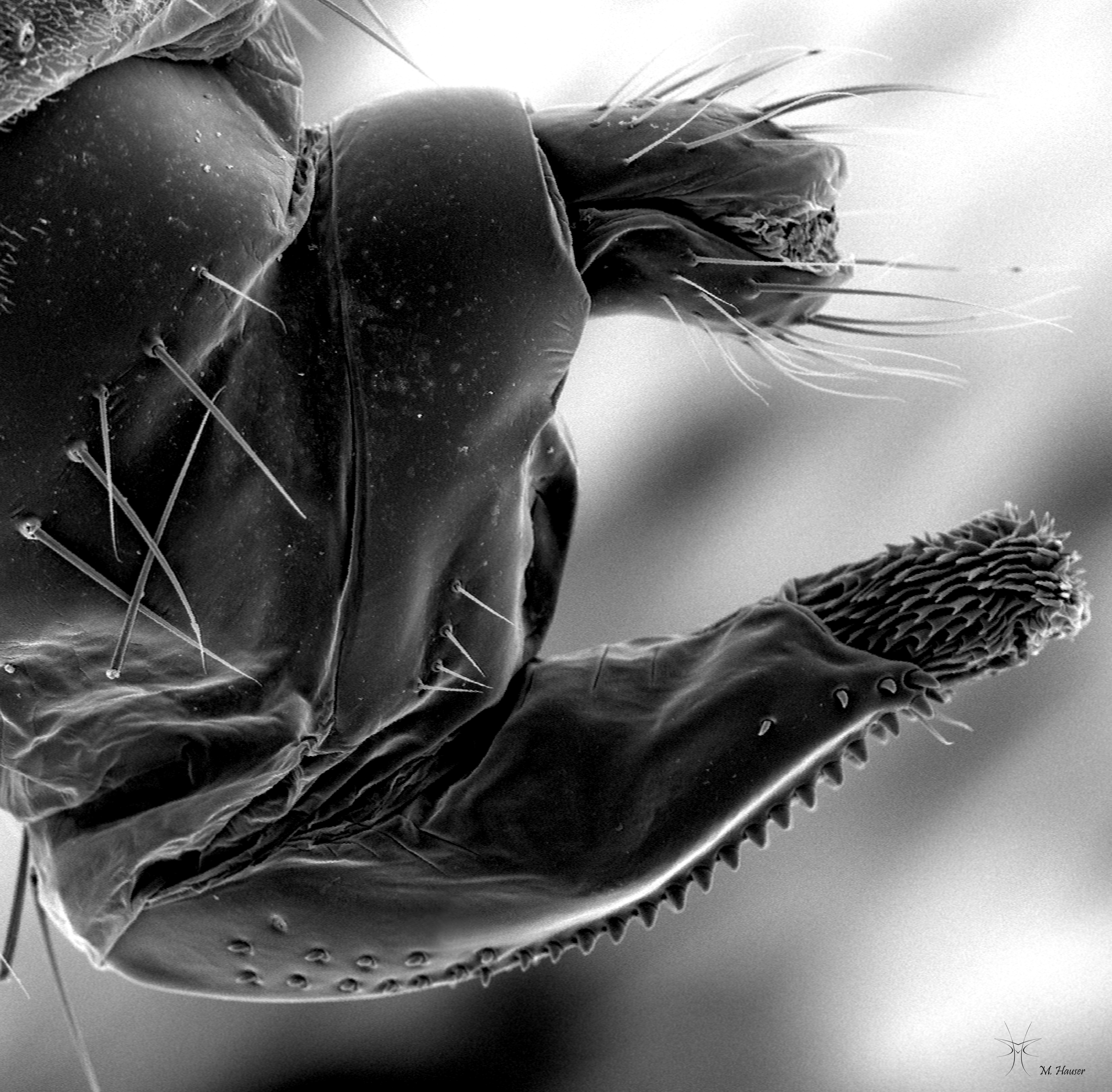
Electron microscope image of the ovipositor of a female

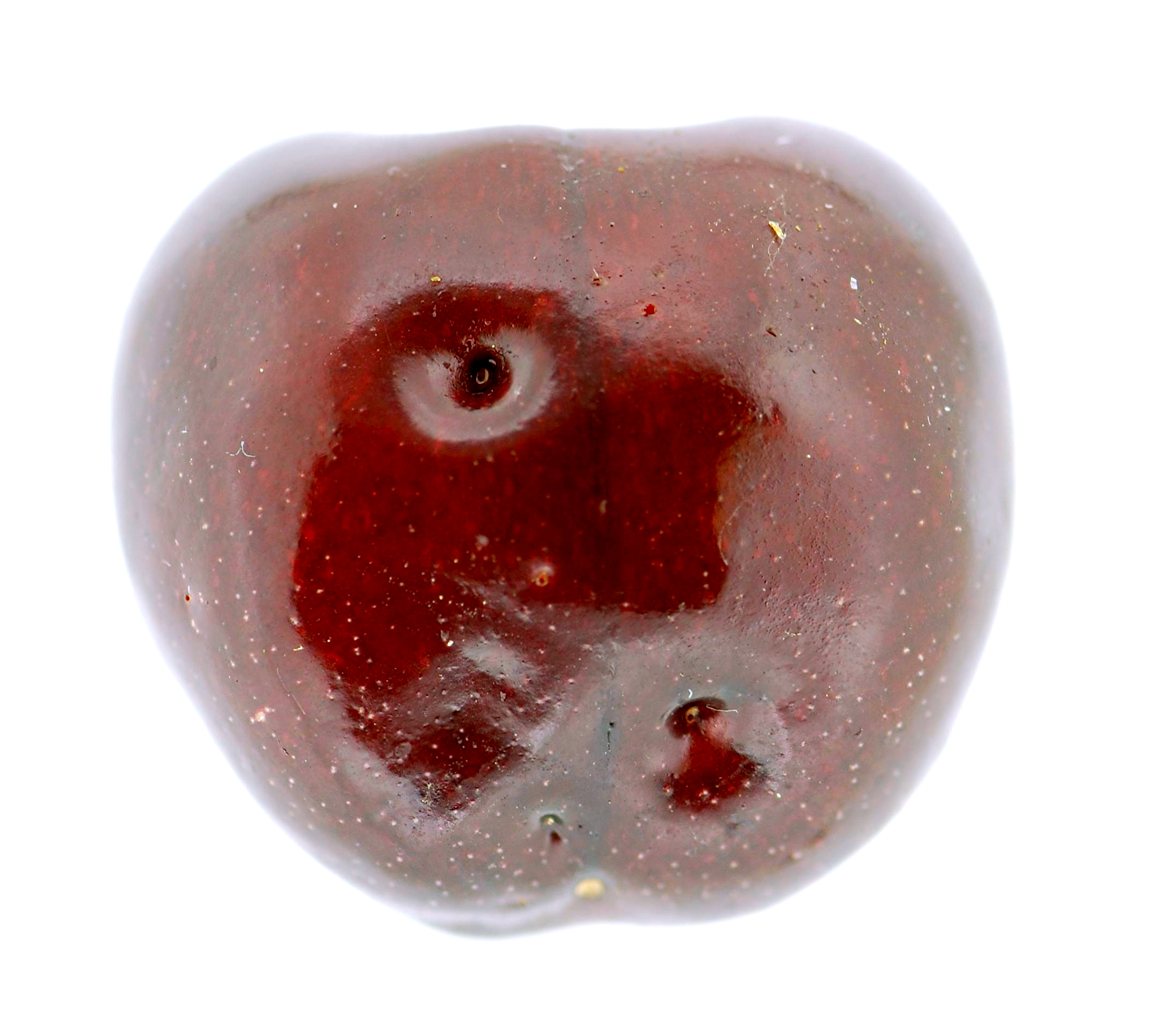
Cherry with oviposition scars

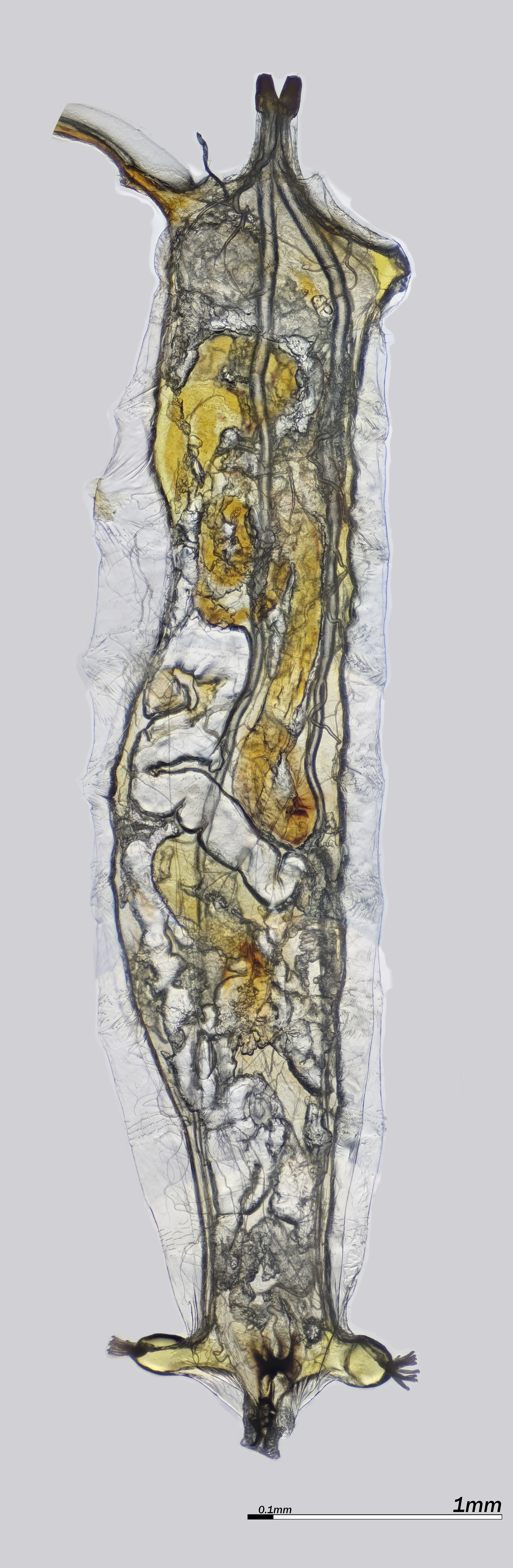
Larva under compound microscope
