= Mikeius hartigi =

Scientific classification
- Kingdom: Animalia
- Phylum: Arthropoda
- Class: Insecta
- Order: Hymenoptera
- Family: Figitidae
- Genus: Mikeius
- Species: M. hartigi

Binomial name
- Mikeius hartigi Buffington, 2008

Species of wasp

Mikeius hartigi is a species of wasp found in Australia, the type species of its genus. Species of Mikeius are thought to be associated with hosts that induce galls on Acacia and Eucalyptus species.

Mikeius hartigi (Girault 1930) (Amblynotus hartigi Girault 1930: replacement name for Amblynotus parvus Girault 1929, not Hartig 1840).
