= Cicatrix schauffi =

Scientific classification
- Kingdom: Animalia
- Phylum: Arthropoda
- Clade: Pancrustacea
- Class: Insecta
- Order: Hymenoptera
- Family: Figitidae
- Genus: Cicatrix
- Species: C. schauffi

Binomial name
- Cicatrix schauffi (Buffington, 2008)

Synonyms
- Mikeius schauffi Buffington, 2008

Species of wasp

Cicatrix schauffi is a species of wasp found in Australia. It was described as Mikeius schauffi in 2008 by Matthew Buffington. In a 2011 revision, the species was moved from Mikeius to the newly erected genus Cicatrix.
