= Mikeius grandawi =

Scientific classification
- Kingdom: Animalia
- Phylum: Arthropoda
- Class: Insecta
- Order: Hymenoptera
- Family: Figitidae
- Genus: Mikeius
- Species: M. grandawi

Binomial name
- Mikeius grandawi Buffington, 2008

Species of wasp

Mikeius grandawi is a species of wasp found in Australia. Species of Mikeius are thought to be associated with hosts that induce galls on Acacia and Eucalyptus species.
