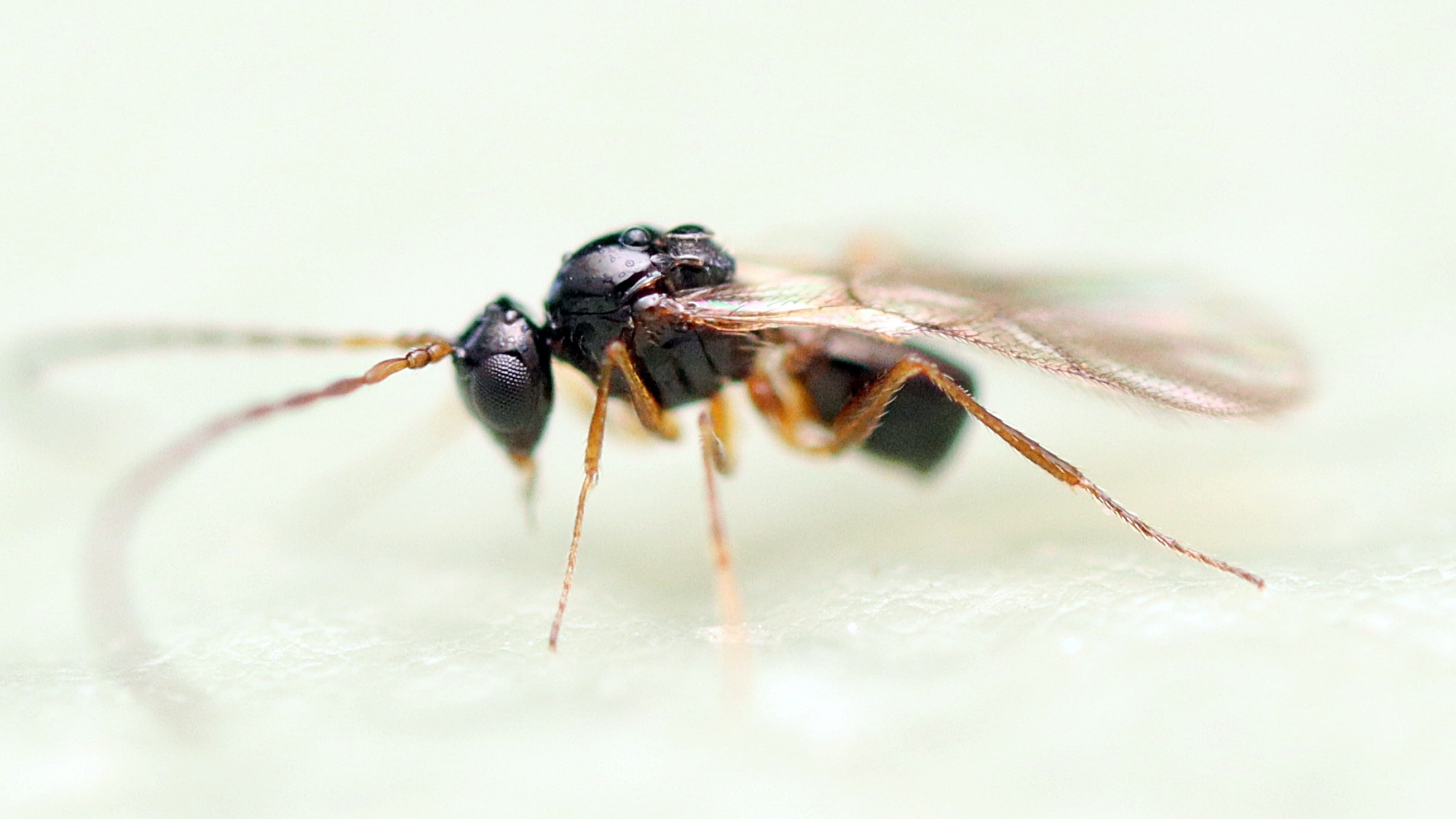
- Leptopilina sp.

Scientific classification
- Kingdom: Animalia
- Phylum: Arthropoda
- Class: Insecta
- Order: Hymenoptera
- Family: Figitidae
- Subfamily: Eucoilinae; Kirby, 1883

Genera
- See text

Diversity
- >80 genera >1000 species

= Eucoilinae =

Subfamily of wasps

Eucoilinae is the largest subfamily within the wasp family Figitidae (Cynipoidea), comprising nearly 1000 described species in over 80 genera. They are small to minute parasitoid wasps that are endoparasitoids of cyclorrhaphous dipteran larvae. Eucoilines are recognized by the presence of a distinctive raised and often sculptured plate or cup on the dorsal surface of the scutellum (the mesoscutellum).

== Taxonomy and systematics ==
Eucoilinae has historically been treated as a separate family (Eucoilidae) by some authors, but recent phylogenetic analyses have consistently placed it as a subfamily within an expanded concept of Figitidae. It is considered part of the "core figitids," a clade that also includes the subfamilies Pycnostigminae, Emargininae, Aspicerinae, and Figitinae, all of which are parasitoids of Diptera.

The most distinctive and diagnostic feature of the subfamily is the scutellar plate (or cup), a raised, distinctly margined structure on the dorsal surface of the scutellum, which contains a glandular pit. This feature is universally present in eucoilines and unique to them among parasitic wasps.

A comprehensive phylogenetic study in 2002 tested the monophyly of six informal genus groups proposed by Nordlander (1982). The results supported the monophyly of the Eucoilinae and suggested a revised grouping of genera, with early divergences indicating an ancient split between primarily Afrotropical and Neotropical lineages.

== Description ==
Adults are small, typically 1–5 mm in length, and most species are fully winged, though some are brachypterous. The body is usually shining black or brown and largely polished. The female antenna has 13 articles, often with a distally swollen club. The male antenna is 15-segmented, with the third or fourth segment modified to bear antennal sex glands. Many genera have a conspicuous ring of dense hairs (a "hairy ring") anteriorly on the third abdominal tergite.

The key diagnostic character is the scutellar plate. The shape, size, sculpture, and position of the glandular pit on this plate vary considerably between genera and species.

== Distribution ==
The subfamily has a worldwide (cosmopolitan) distribution, with its highest diversity found in tropical regions, particularly the Neotropics.

== Biology and ecology ==
All eucoilines are solitary koinobiont endoparasitoids. They attack first-instar larvae of cyclorrhaphous flies (Diptera) in various microhabitats. The wasp larva develops inside the host larva, which continues to feed and grow. The parasitoid emerges from the host pupa (puparium) by chewing an irregular exit hole.

Hosts include a wide range of cyclorrhaphous flies whose larvae develop in diverse environments such as decaying vegetation, fungi, rotting wood, carrion, dung, bird nests, ant refuse deposits, and as leaf-miners or fruit-borers in plants. As such, some eucoiline species are important in biological control programs against pest flies (e.g., some Agromyzidae leaf-miners and Tephritidae fruit flies) and are also studied in the context of forensic entomology.

== Genera ==
The following 73 genera are a partial list based on the 2025 update from WaspWeb:

- Acantheucoela Ashmead, 1900 (Neotropical)
- Afrodontaspis Weld, 1961 (Afrotropical)
- Afrostilba Benoit, 1956 (Afrotropical)
- Aganaspis Lin, 1987 (Worldwide)
- Angustacorpa Quinlan, 1988 (Afrotropical)
- Areaspis Lin, 1988 (Afrotropical, Oriental)
- Aspidogyrus Yoshimoto, 1962 (Nearctic: Hawaii)
- Banacuniculus Buffington, 2010 (Nearctic, Neotropical)
- Bothrochacis Cameron, 1904 (Afrotropical, Nearctic (Hawaii), Oriental)
- Caleucoela Kieffer, 1909 (Neotropical)
- Chrestosema Förster, 1869 (Oriental, Palaearctic)
- Coneucoela Kieffer, 1909 (Neotropical)
- Cothonaspis Hartig, 1840 (Afrotropical, Holarctic)
- Delomeris Diaz & Gallardo, 1996 (Neotropical)
- Dettmeria Borgmeier, 1935 (Neotropical)
- Dicerataspis Ashmead, 1896 (Neotropical)
- Didyctium Riley, 1879 (Worldwide)
- Dieucoila Ashmead, 1903 (Nearctic, Neotropical)
- Diglyphosema Förster, 1869 (Palaearctic)
- Discaspis Lin, 1988 (Oriental)
- Disorygma Förster, 1869 (Palaearctic, Oriental)
- Ditanyomeria Yoshimoto, 1963 (Australasian)
- Ealata Quinlan, 1986 (Afrotropical, Oriental)
- Endecameris Yoshimoto, 1963 (Afrotropical, Australasian, Oriental, Palaearctic)
- Epicoela Borgmeier, 1935 (Neotropical)
- Epochresta Lin, 1988 (Oriental)
- Eucoila Westwood, 1833 (Holarctic)
- Eutrias Förster, 1869 (Holarctic)
- Euxestophaga Gallardo, 2017 (Neotropical)
- Fontaliella Pujade-Villar, 2013 (Neotropical)
- Ganaspidium Weld, 1955 (Afrotropical, Nearctic, Neotropical)
- Ganaspis Förster, 1869 (Worldwide)
- Garudella Buffington & Forshage, 2014 (Afrotropical, Oriental)
- Gastraspis Lin, 1988 (Afrotropical, Oriental)
- Glauraspidia Thomson, 1862 (Nearctic, Neotropical, Palaearctic)
- Gronotoma Förster, 1869 (Worldwide)
- Hexacola Förster, 1869 (Worldwide)
- Humboldteria Buffington (Neotropical)
- Hydrelliaeucoila Díaz & Gallardo, 2009 (Neotropical)
- Hypodiranchis Ashmead, 1901 (Oceanic, Palaearctic)
- Kleidotoma Westwood, 1833 (Worldwide)
- Leptolamina Yoshimoto, 1962 (Afrotropical, Australasian, Oriental, Palaearctic)
- Leptopilina Förster, 1869 (Worldwide)
- Linaspis Lin, 1988 (Palaearctic)
- Linoeucoila Lin, 1988 (Afrotropical, Oriental)
- Lispothyreus Yoshimoto, 1962 (Hawaii)
- Lopheucoila Weld, 1951 (Neotropical)
- Maacynips Yoshimoto, 1963 (Australasian, Oceanic, Palaearctic)
- Marthiella Buffington, 2009 (Neotropical)
- Micreriodes Yoshimoto, 1962 (Afrotropical, Australasian, Nearctic, Oriental, Palaearctic)
- Microstilba Förster, 1869 (Palaearctic)
- Mirandicola Belizin, 1968 (Oriental, Palaearctic)
- Moneucoela Kieffer, 1907 (Neotropical)
- Moritiella Buffington, 2006 (Neotropical)
- Muhaka Buffington & Copeland, 2015 (Afrotropical)
- Nanocthulhu Buffington, 2012 (Afrotropical)
- Nesodiranchis Perkins, 1910 (Hawaii)
- Nordlanderia Quinlan, 1986 (Afrotropical, Palaearctic)
- Nordlanderiana Kovalev, 1989 (Palaearctic)
- Nordlandiella Díaz, 1982 (Nearctic, Neotropical)
- Odonteucoila Ashmead, 1903 (Neotropical)
- Odontosema Kieffer, 1909 (Neotropical)
- Paradettmeria Gallardo & Díaz, 2011 (Neotropical)
- Paradiglyphosema Lin, 1988 (Afrotropical, Oriental)
- Paraganaspis Díaz & Gallardo, 1996 (Nearctic, Neotropical)
- Pentamerocera Ashmead, 1896 (Neotropical)
- Penteucoila Weld, 1951 (Neotropical)
- Perischus Weld, 1931 (Neotropical)
- Pressia Belizin, 1968 (Palaearctic)
- Preseucoela Buffington, 2002 (Nearctic, Neotropical)
- Promiomera Ashmead, 1903 (Neotropical)
- Pseudodiranchis Yoshimoto, 1962 (Hawaii)
- Quasimodoana Forshage, Nordlander & Ronquist, 2008 (Palaearctic, Nearctic)
- Rhabdeucoela Kieffer, 1907 (Neotropical)
- Rhoptromeris Förster, 1869 (Worldwide)
- Sinatra Buffington, 2011 (Oceanic)
- Sinochresta Lin, 1988 (Oriental)
- Steleucoela Kieffer, 1908 (Neotropical)
- Stentorceps Quinlan, 1984 (Afrotropical)
- Striatovertex Schick, Forshage & Nordlander, 2011 (Nearctic inc. Hawaii, Neotropical)
- Tobiasiana Kovalev, 1979 (Palaearctic)
- Trichoplasta Benoit, 1956 (Worldwide)
- Triplasta Kieffer, 1901 (Neotropical)
- Tropideucoila Ashmead, 1903 (Neotropical)
- Trissodontaspis Ashmead, 1903 (Neotropical)
- Trybliographa Förster, 1869 (Worldwide)
- Weldia Yoshimoto, 1962 (Hawaii)
- Zaeucoila Ashmead, 1903 (Nearctic, Neotropical)
- Zamischus Ashmead, 1903 (Neotropical)
