= Stentorceps =

Scientific classification
- Kingdom: Animalia
- Phylum: Arthropoda
- Class: Insecta
- Order: Hymenoptera
- Family: Figitidae
- Subfamily: Eucoilinae
- Genus: Stentorceps; Quinlan, 1984

Type species
- Stentorceps tubicen Quinlan, 1984

Genus of wasps

Stentorceps is a genus of parasitoid wasps in the family Figitidae found in Africa.

== Taxonomy and systematics ==
The genus was erected by Quinlan in 1984 for the single, highly unusual species Stentorceps tubicen from Kenya. The genus remained monotypic until a major revision in 2011 by Nielsen and Buffington, which redescribed the genus and added five new species.

The genus name Stentorceps is derived from Latin, likely referring to the "stentorian" (loud or powerful) and prominent "horn" (-ceps, from caput, meaning head) structure.

Stentorceps is considered part of the Rhoptromeris genus group within Eucoilinae, though its precise phylogenetic relationships are not fully resolved.

== Description ==
Species of Stentorceps are immediately recognizable by their extraordinary head morphology, which is unique among Hymenoptera. Key features include a large, trumpet-shaped projection called the corniculum situated between the antennae. This structure varies in size and shape between species, from small and parallel-sided to large and flared, sometimes obscuring parts of the face. Beneath the corniculum are two smaller, knob-like pyriform protuberances. The wasps also possess extremely large, sickle-shaped mandibles and an often complexly sculptured mesosoma (thorax). The function of these bizarre structures remains unknown, but they are presumed to be related to the parasitoid lifestyle, possibly for host manipulation or mating.

== Distribution and habitat ==
The genus is endemic to Africa. Species are known from Kenya and Madagascar. Specimens are typically collected in riverine, swampy, or littoral forests using Malaise traps, suggesting these are the preferred habitats for the wasps and their unknown hosts.

== Biology ==
As with most eucoiline wasps, species of Stentorceps are presumed to be koinobiont endoparasitoids. Their hosts are unknown but are likely to be dipteran larvae (flies), as this is the typical host group for the subfamily.

== Species ==
The genus contains six described species:

- Stentorceps abbotti Nielsen & Buffington, 2011 – Madagascar
- Stentorceps heimdalli Nielsen & Buffington, 2011 – Madagascar
- Stentorceps tubicen Quinlan, 1984 – Kenya (type species)
- Stentorceps vuvuzela Nielsen & Buffington, 2011 – Kenya
- Stentorceps weedlei Nielsen & Buffington, 2011 – Madagascar
- Stentorceps zuparkoi Nielsen & Buffington, 2011 – Kenya
