= Maacynips papuana =

Scientific classification
- Kingdom: Animalia
- Phylum: Arthropoda
- Class: Insecta
- Order: Hymenoptera
- Family: Figitidae
- Genus: Maacynips
- Species: M. papuana

Binomial name
- Maacynips papuana Yoshimoto, 1963

Species of wasp

Maacynips papuana is a species of gall wasp tentatively placed in the tribe Eucoilini. It was first described in 1963 by Carl M. Yoshimoto. Maacynips as a genus was placed under the tribe Eucoilini in 2008 by Forshage, Nordlander, and Ronquist. The genus is currently under review and its status, along with that of its member species, is unclear.
