= Mikeius =

Scientific classification
- Kingdom: Animalia
- Phylum: Arthropoda
- Class: Insecta
- Order: Hymenoptera
- Family: Figitidae
- Subfamily: Mikeiinae; Paretas-Martínez & Pujade-Villar, 2011
- Genus: Mikeius; Buffington, 2008

Genus of wasps

Mikeius is a genus of wasps found in Australia. Species of Mikeius are thought to be associated with hosts that induce galls on Acacia and Eucalyptus species.

The genus and six species were first described in 2008. In 2011, several alterations were made to the taxonomy of Mikeius. One new species, M. clavatus, was described, and a new subfamily, Mikeiinae, was erected from Thrasorinae. M. neumanni was transferred to the new genus Cicatrix and M. schauffi was transferred to the new genus Palmiriella.

== Species ==
Currently accepted:

- Mikeius berryi Buffington, 2008
- Mikeius clavatus Pujade-Villar & Restrepo-Ortiz, 2011
- Mikeius gatesi Buffington, 2008
- Mikeius grandawi Buffington, 2008
- Mikeius hartigi Buffington, 2008

Formerly accepted:

- Mikeius neumanni Buffington, 2008, now Palmiriella neumanni
- Mikeius schauffi Buffington, 2008, now Cicatrix schauffi
