= Parnips =

Scientific classification
- Kingdom: Animalia
- Phylum: Arthropoda
- Class: Insecta
- Order: Hymenoptera
- Family: Figitidae
- Genus: Parnips

Genus of insects

Parnips is a genus of the family Figitidae, order Hymenoptera.
