= Palmiriella =

Scientific classification
- Kingdom: Animalia
- Phylum: Arthropoda
- Clade: Pancrustacea
- Class: Insecta
- Order: Hymenoptera
- Family: Figitidae
- Genus: Palmiriella; Pujade-Villar & Paretas-Martínez, 2011
- Species: P. neumanni

Binomial name
- Palmiriella neumanni (Buffington, 2008)

Synonyms
- Mikeius neumanni Buffington, 2008

Genus of wasp

Palmiriella is a monotypic genus of wasp found in Australia. The sole species is Palmiriella neumanni. It was initially described as Mikeius neumanni in 2008 by Matthew Buffington. In a 2011 revision, the species was moved to the newly erected genus Palmiriella. The genus is named for Palmira Ros-Farraré.

The holotype, a female, measures 3.2 mm (0.13 in). It was collected from Mount Nebo, Queensland. Males are unknown.
