= Maacynips =

Scientific classification
- Kingdom: Animalia
- Phylum: Arthropoda
- Class: Insecta
- Order: Hymenoptera
- Family: Figitidae
- Genus: Maacynips; Yoshimoto, 1963

Species
- See text

Genus of wasps

Maacynips is a genus of gall wasp tentatively placed in the tribe Eucoilini. It was originally described in 1963 by Carl M. Yoshimoto. Subsequent research did not find more samples of the genus. It was placed under the tribe Eucoilini in 2008 by Forshage, Nordlander, and Ronquist. Maacynips is currently under review and its status is unclear.

== Species ==
Yoshimoto described three species under Maacynips, which are also under review.

- Maacynips distincta
- Maacynips papuana
- Maacynips parva
