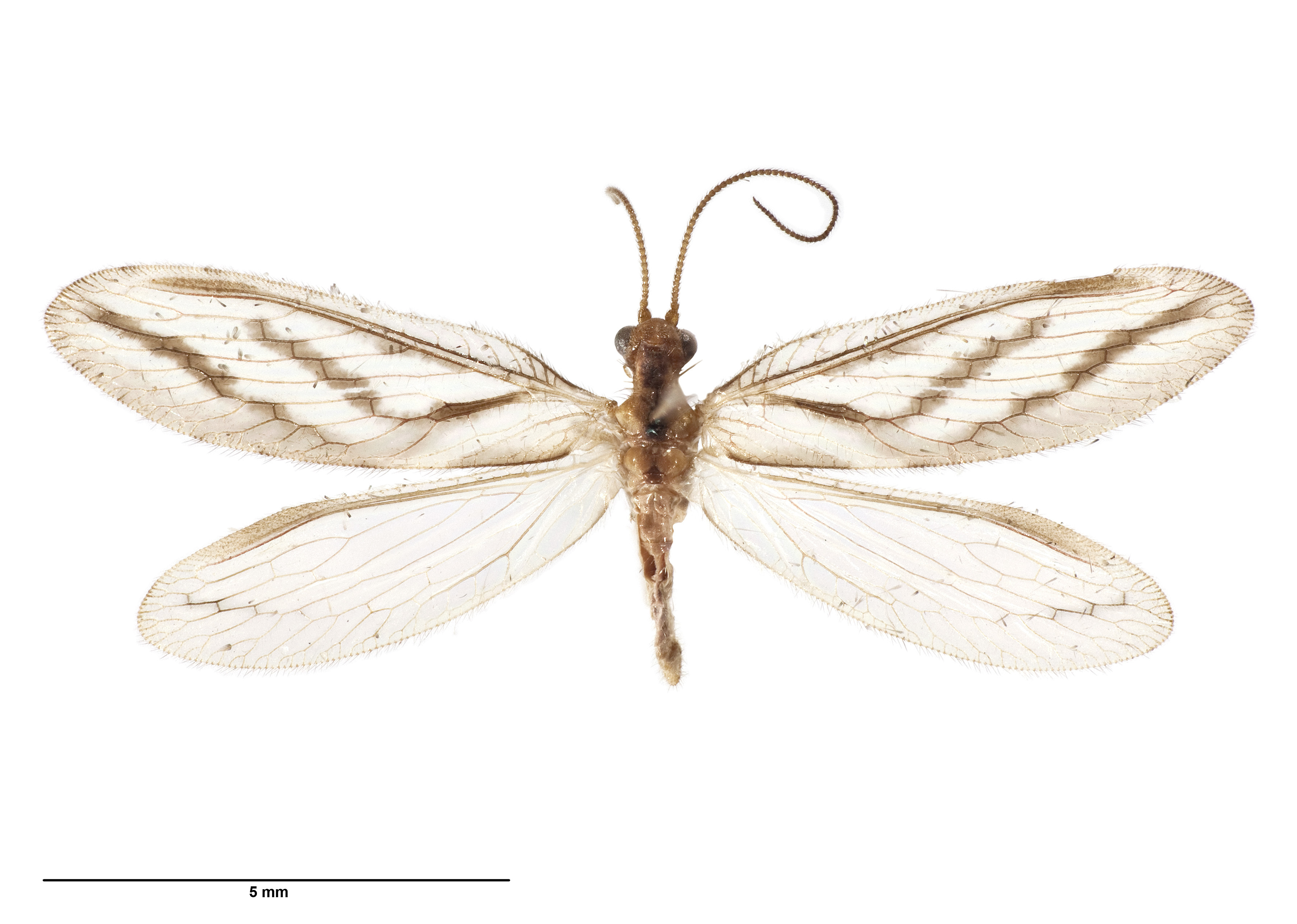

Scientific classification
- Domain: Eukaryota
- Kingdom: Animalia
- Phylum: Arthropoda
- Class: Insecta
- Order: Neuroptera
- Family: Hemerobiidae
- Genus: Micromus
- Species: M. bifasciatus

Binomial name
- Micromus bifasciatus (Tillyard, 1923)

Synonyms
- Micromus bifasciatus var. manapouriensis Tillyard, 1923; Micromus bifasciatus var. nigroscriptus Tillyard, 1923; Micromus bifasciatus var. imperfectus Tillyard, 1923; Micromus bifasciatus var. amabilis Tillyard, 1923; Micromus tasmaniae var. nigroscriptus Tillyard, 1923; Micromus tasmaniae var. manapouriensis Tillyard, 1923

= Micromus bifasciatus =

Species of insect

Micromus bifasciatus, is a species of Australasian brown lacewing in the family Hemerobiidae that was first described by Robert John Tillyard in 1923.

== Description and ecology ==
Micromus bifasciatus is a dark brown colour, with wing veins that are typically pink. The species can be differentiated from Micromus tasmaniae by the two brown transverse bands found on the species' anterior wings, compared to the spotted pattern found on Micromus tasmaniae.

== Distribution and habitat ==
In New Zealand, this species has been recorded occurring from the far north of the North Island, to Invercargill and Stewart Island in the south. It has mostly been recorded on native forest, such as Prumnopitys taxifolia, Dacrydium cupressinum and Dacrycarpus dacrydioides, all varieties of tree which host scale insects or mealybugs, and is typically associated with Podocarpus trees.
