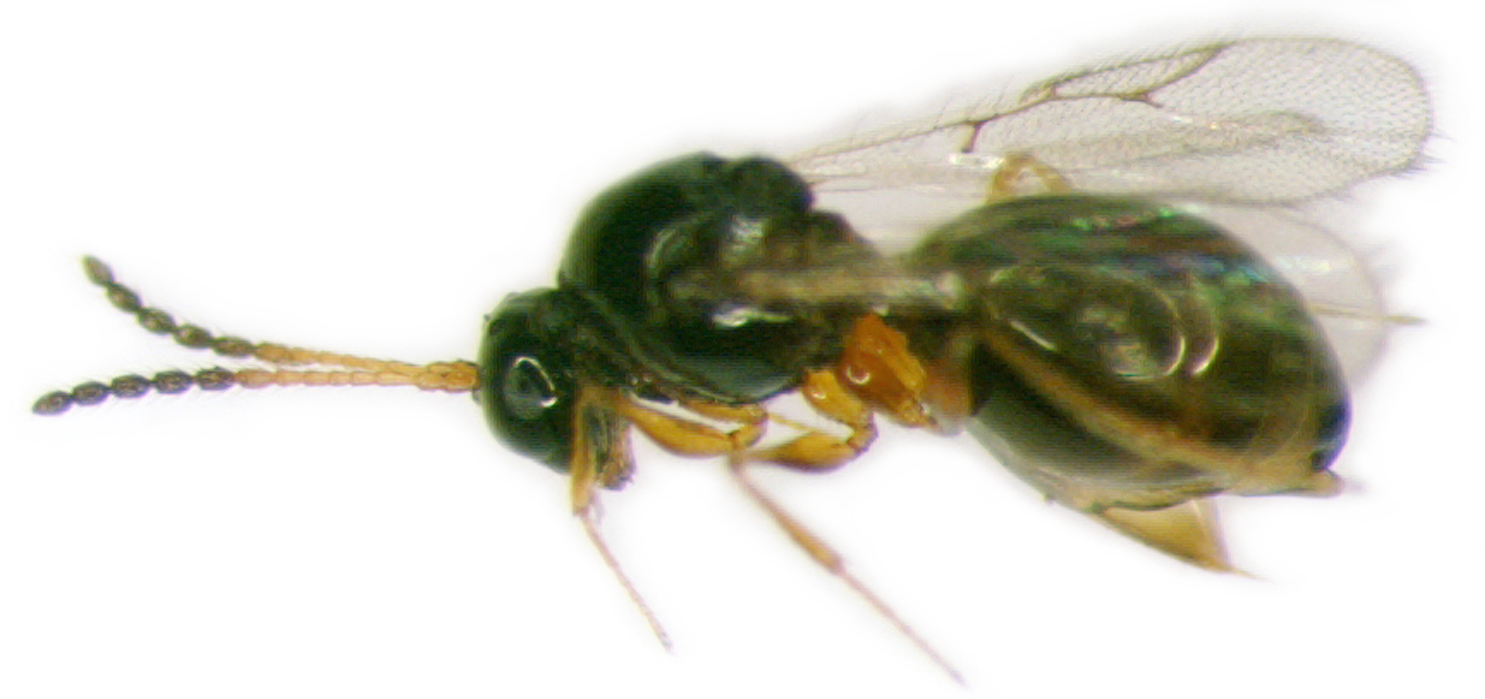
- Leptopilina boulardii (Eucoilinae), a parasitoid of Drosophila

Scientific classification
- Kingdom: Animalia
- Phylum: Arthropoda
- Class: Insecta
- Order: Hymenoptera
- Family: Figitidae
- Subfamily: Eucoilinae
- Genus: Leptopilina; Förster, 1862

= Leptopilina =

Genus of wasps

Leptopilina is a genus of parasitoid wasp in the family Figitidae. The genus is best known for the three Drosophila parasitoids Leptopilina boulardi, Leptopilina heterotoma and Leptopilina clavipes, used to study host-parasite immune interactions. The venom released by L. heterotoma during oviposition contains virus-like particles that delay host larval development and suppress the host cellular immune response. There is no evidence that these virus-like particles are the products of viral DNA as described in other parasitoid taxa.

Leptopilina japonica is a parasitoid of Drosophila suzukii which is an important pest in fruit production. It was first captured in November 2020 as bycatch from a Vespa mandarinia trap in Washington State - the first find of this species in the United States. This may help to control D. suzukii in North America.
