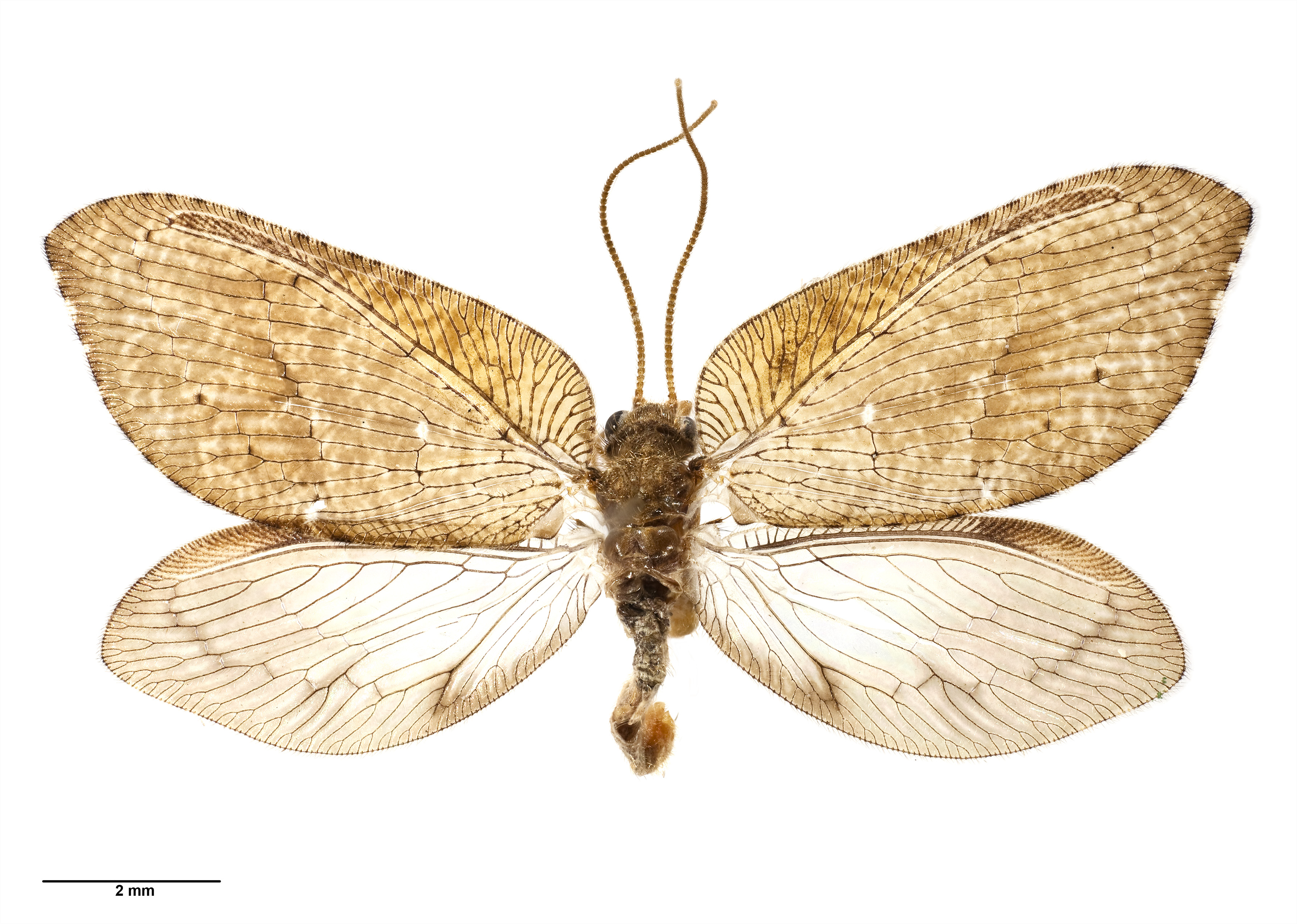

Scientific classification
- Kingdom: Animalia
- Phylum: Arthropoda
- Class: Insecta
- Order: Neuroptera
- Family: Hemerobiidae
- Genus: Drepanacra
- Species: D. binocula

Binomial name
- Drepanacra binocula (Newman, 1838)

Synonyms
- Drepanacra binocula var. suboculata Tillyard, 1923; Drepanacra binocula var. excisa Tillyard, 1923; Drepanacra binocula var. divisa Tillyard, 1923; Drepanacra binocula var. bilineata Tillyard, 1923; Drepanacra binocula Tillyard, 1917; Drepanacra norfolkensis Tillyard, 1917; Drepanacra instabilis Tillyard, 1917; Drepanacra binocula var. rubrinervis Tillyard, 1916; Drepanacra binocula var. pallida Tillyard, 1916; Drepanacra binocula var. tasmanica Tillyard, 1916; Drepanacra binocula var. longitudinalis Tillyard, 1916; Drepanacra froggatti Tillyard, 1916; Drepanacra hardyi Tillyard, 1916; Drepanacra instabilis var. rubrinervis Tillyard, 1916; Drepanacra instabilis var. pallida Tillyard, 1916; Drepanacra humilis var. longitudinalis Tillyard, 1916; Drepanacra humilis var. tasmanica Tillyard, 1916; Drepanepteryx maori Hare, [1910]; Drepanacra humilior (Hare, [1910]); Drepanepteryx humilior Hare, [1910]; Megalomus lanceolatus Gerstaecker, [1885]; Drepanepteryx instabilis McLachlan, 1863; Drepanacra instabilis var. instabilis (McLachlan, 1863); Drepanacra humilis var. humilis (McLachlan, 1863); Drepanacra instabilis (McLachlan, 1863); Drepanacra humilis (McLachlan, 1863); Drepanepteryx humilis McLachlan, 1863; Hemerobius binoculus (Newman, 1838) Drepanepteryx binocula Newman, 1838

= Drepanacra binocula =

Species of insect

Drepanacra binocula, known as the Australian variable lacewing, is a species of brown lacewing in the family Hemerobiidae, found across Australia and New Zealand, including Lord Howe Island, Norfolk Island and the Kermadec Islands.

== Description ==
Australian variable lacewings are typically found in colonies of the insects they prey on. It has been seen feeding on a variety of hosts, including Psyllidae, spruce aphids, pine aphids, whiteflies, Eriosoma lanigerum and Trioza vitreoradiata. Drepanacra binocula can be identified by the distinctive shape and brown colour of its wings.

The species has been established in New Zealand since at least 1930. Drepanacra binocula is host to a parasitic wasp, the Lacewing Parasitoid Wasp Anacharis zealandica.

== Life Stages ==
The early stages of D. binocula are egg, larva, and pupa before they emerge as adults. The eggs are pale grey when laid but darken to grey/brown before hatching. As they hatch, they use a blade-like bodily structure called an oviruptor to pierce the egg. After hatching, they go through three larval stages until they enter a cocoon where they mature until they reach adulthood.
