= Ganaspis =

Scientific classification
- Kingdom: Animalia
- Phylum: Arthropoda
- Clade: Pancrustacea
- Class: Insecta
- Order: Hymenoptera
- Family: Figitidae
- Subfamily: Eucoilinae
- Genus: Ganaspis; Förster, 1869

Genus of parasitoid wasps

Ganaspis is a genus of parasitoid wasp belonging to the family Figitidae. They are parasitoids of Drosophila species, with Ganaspis brasiliensis and Ganaspis kimorum in particular gaining attention for their potential biological control of Drosophila suzukii. Other known hosts of the G. brasiliensis species complex include Drosophila melanogaster and Drosophila simulans.

There are 49 nominal species, of which 17 belong in other genera and await new combinations, while 8 are nomina inquirenda, leaving 24 described species. Selected Ganaspis species include:

- Ganaspis assimilis Belizin, 1966
- Ganaspis brasiliensis Ihering, 1905 (pan-tropical)
- Ganaspis dubia Masner, 1958
- Ganaspis hofferi Masner, 1958
- Ganaspis kimorum Buffington et al., 2024 (temperate), permitted for release in the United States for biocontrol of Drosophila suzukii
- Ganaspis lupini Buffington et al., 2024 (temperate)
- Ganaspis mahensis Kieffer, 1911 (Seychelles)
- Ganaspis mundata Förster, 1869
- Ganaspis pelleranoi Brèthes, 1924
- Ganaspis ruandana Benoit, 1956 (Rwanda)
- Ganaspis seticornis Hellén, 1960
- Ganaspis xanthopoda Ashmead, 1896 (worldwide)
