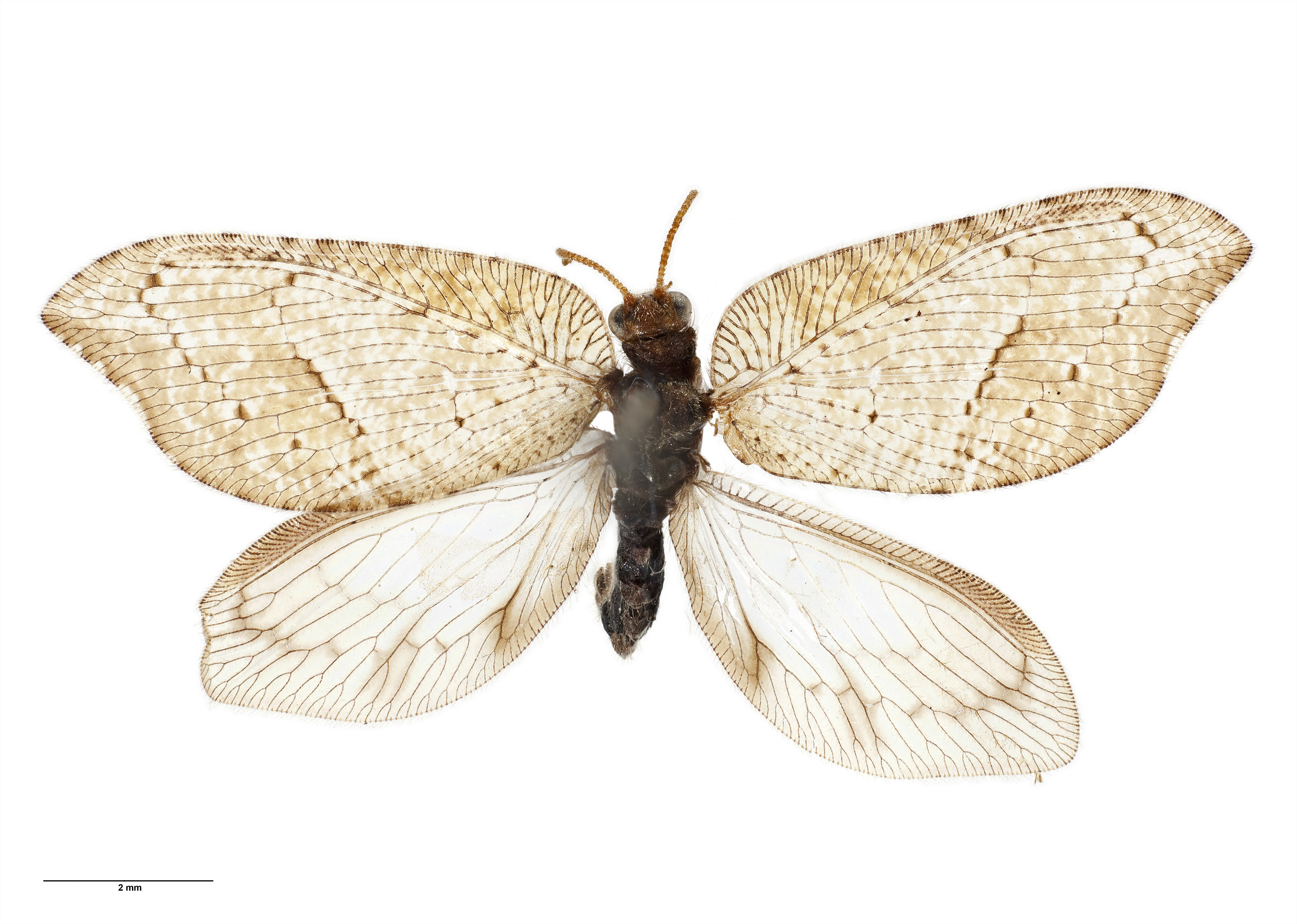
- Drepanacra binocula

Scientific classification
- Kingdom: Animalia
- Phylum: Arthropoda
- Class: Insecta
- Order: Neuroptera
- Family: Hemerobiidae
- Genus: Drepanacra; Tillyard, 1916

= Drepanacra =

Genus of lacewings

Drepanacra is a genus of lacewings belonging to the family Hemerobiidae.

The species of this genus are found in Australia and New Zealand.

Species:

- Drepanacra binocula (Newman, 1838)
- Drepanacra khasiana (Kimmins, 1940)
- Drepanacra plaga Banks, 1939
