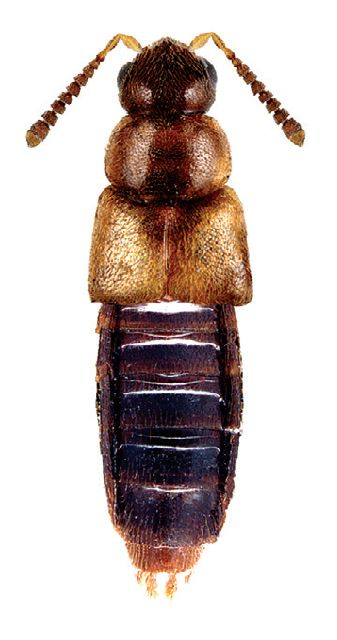

Scientific classification
- Kingdom: Animalia
- Phylum: Arthropoda
- Clade: Pancrustacea
- Class: Insecta
- Order: Coleoptera
- Suborder: Polyphaga
- Infraorder: Staphyliniformia
- Family: Staphylinidae
- Subfamily: Aleocharinae
- Tribe: Athetini
- Subtribe: Athetina
- Genus: Dalotia
- Species: D. coriaria

Binomial name
- Dalotia coriaria (Kraatz, 1856)

Synonyms
- Homalota coriaria; Atheta (s. str.) coriaria; Pseudota miscella; Dimetrota (Dalotia) pectorina; Dimetrota (Dalotia) crucialis; Dimetrota (Dalotia) pectorina; Dimetrota (Dalotia) crucialis; Atheta (Pancota) miscella; Atheta (Dimetrota) pectorina; Atheta (Dimetrota) crucialis; Atheta (s. str.) coriaria; Atheta (Pancota) miscella; Atheta (Dimetrota) pectorina; Atheta (Dimetrota) crucialis; Atheta (s. str.) coriaria; Atheta (Mischgruppe I) coriaria; Atheta (s. str.) coriaria; Atheta (Pancota) miscella; Atheta (Dimetrota) pectorina; Atheta (Dimetrota) crucialis; Taxicera academica; Xenota coriaria; Pseudota miscella; Dimetrota pectorina; Dimetrota crucialis; Atheta (s. str.) coriaria; Atheta coriaria; “Atheta” coriaria; Taxicera academica

= Dalotia coriaria =

Species of beetle

Dalotia coriaria, the greenhouse rove beetle, is a species of staphylinid rove beetle in the subfamily Aleocharinae. It is used as a predatory biological control agent for the management of pest insects.

== Biological control ==
Dalotia coriaria is a commercially available species, sold by several Integrated Pest Management companies in the US and Europe. The beetles are employed as a biological control agent of glasshouse pests. Both adults and larvae prey upon larvae of fungus gnats (Bradysia spp.), and adult beetles also target shore flies (Scatella spp.) and thrips. The species was discovered feeding on a laboratory culture of fungus gnats, stimulating a study into its efficacy as a biological control agent.

== Use as a model organism ==
Dalotia coriaria's fast generation time, high fecundity and ease of culture of have recently led to the species being developed as a laboratory model organism.

== Taxonomic history ==
Like many Aleocharinae, Dalotia coriaria has a complex taxonomic history. Initially described as a member of genus Homalota, many authors placed it in the large genus Atheta, before its current placement in Dalotia.
