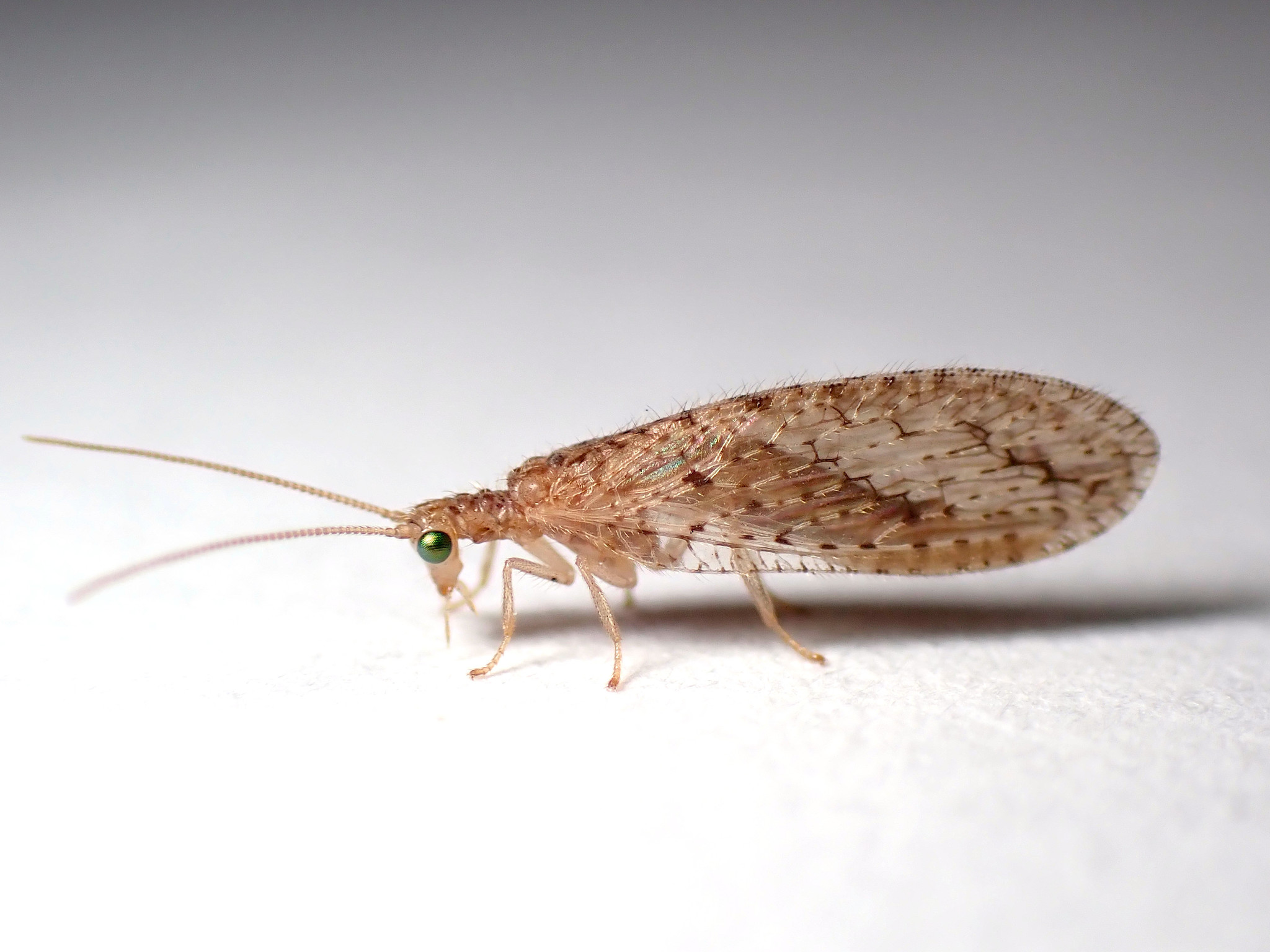

Scientific classification
- Kingdom: Animalia
- Phylum: Arthropoda
- Class: Insecta
- Order: Neuroptera
- Family: Hemerobiidae
- Genus: Micromus
- Species: M. tasmaniae

Binomial name
- Micromus tasmaniae (Walker, 1860): Austromicromus tasmaniae Walker, 1860; Eumicromus tasmaniae Walker, 1860; Hemerobius tasmaniae Walker, 1860; Micromus froggatti Banks, 1909; Micromus perkinsi Banks, 1939; Neomicromus tasmaniae Walker, 1860

= Micromus tasmaniae =

Species of insect

Micromus tasmaniae, known as the Tasmanian brown lacewing, is a species of brown lacewing in the family Hemerobiidae. It is widespread in Australia, New Zealand, and Pacific Islands such as New Caledonia and Vanuatu.

== Description and ecology ==
Adults of the species are 7.5–10 mm (0.30–0.39 in) long, and are typically nocturnal. The lacewing's lifespan is temperature dependent (higher temperatures causing shorter larval stages). The Tasmanian Brown Lacewing breeds all year round, surviving at temperatures as low as 5 °C (41 °F). The species typically has clear wings and a brown body. The species can be differentiated from Micromus bifasciatus by the spotted pattern on the species' anterior wings, compared to the brown transverse bands found on Micromus bifasciatus.

The lacewings feed on nectar, as well as aphids and psyllids.

== Distribution and habitat ==
The species is found widely across Australia, and is likely the most common species found in both Australia and New Zealand. The species has been established in New Zealand since at least 1869, and has been identified in remote areas of the country, including the Chatham Islands, Auckland Islands, Antipodes Islands and Kermadec Islands. It has been seen feeding on aphids (especially spruce aphids), and has been found on alfalfa. During the daytime, adults and larvae hide (larvae hiding at the bases of plants in the daytime). The oval-shaped white eggs of the species are often laid on plant hairs and spider webs, close to the species the adults are preying upon.

The species is associated with a wide range of plants and ranges, compared to Micromus bifasciatus, which is typically associated with Podocarpus trees.

== Gallery ==
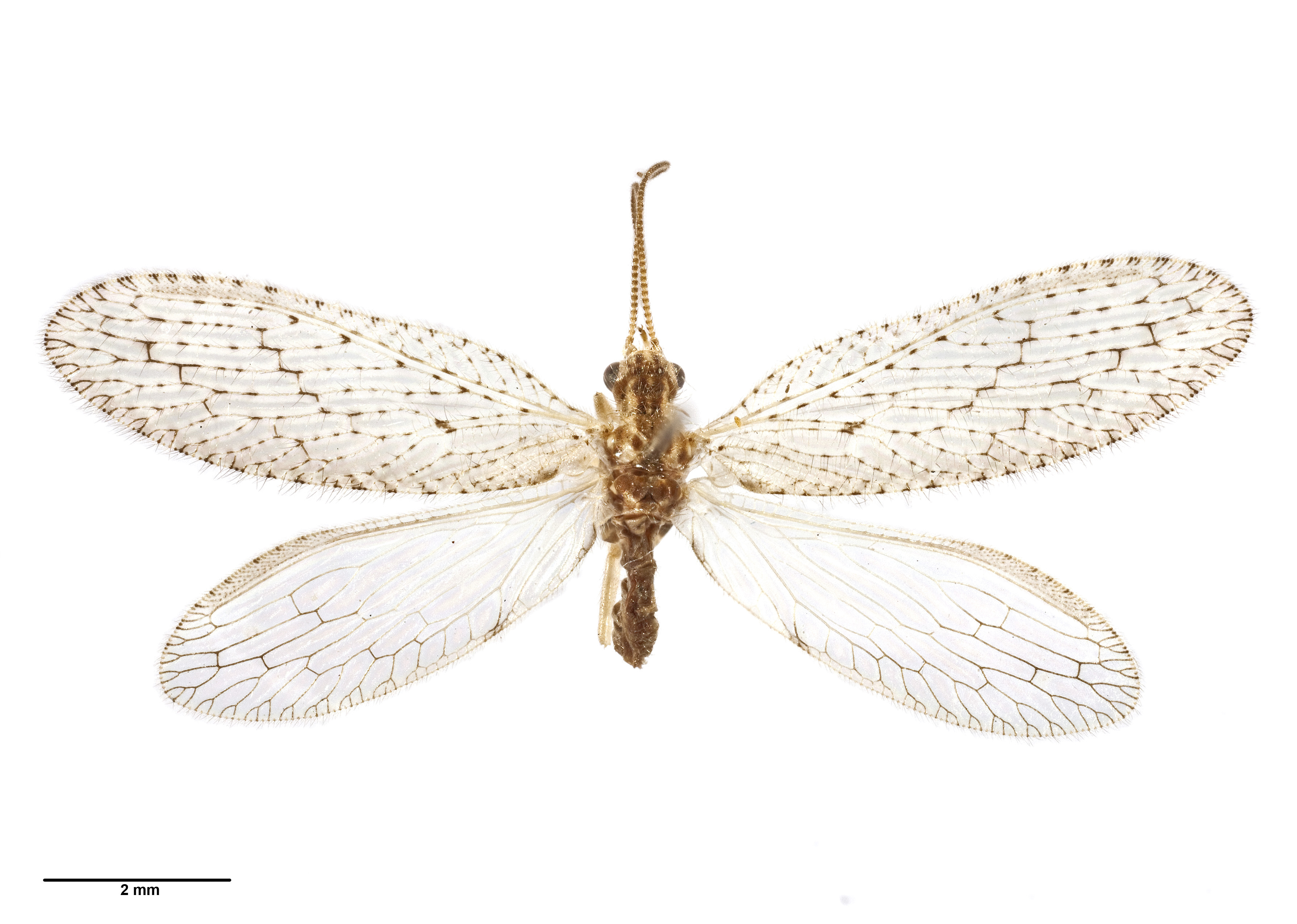
Entomology specimen of Micromus tasmaniae

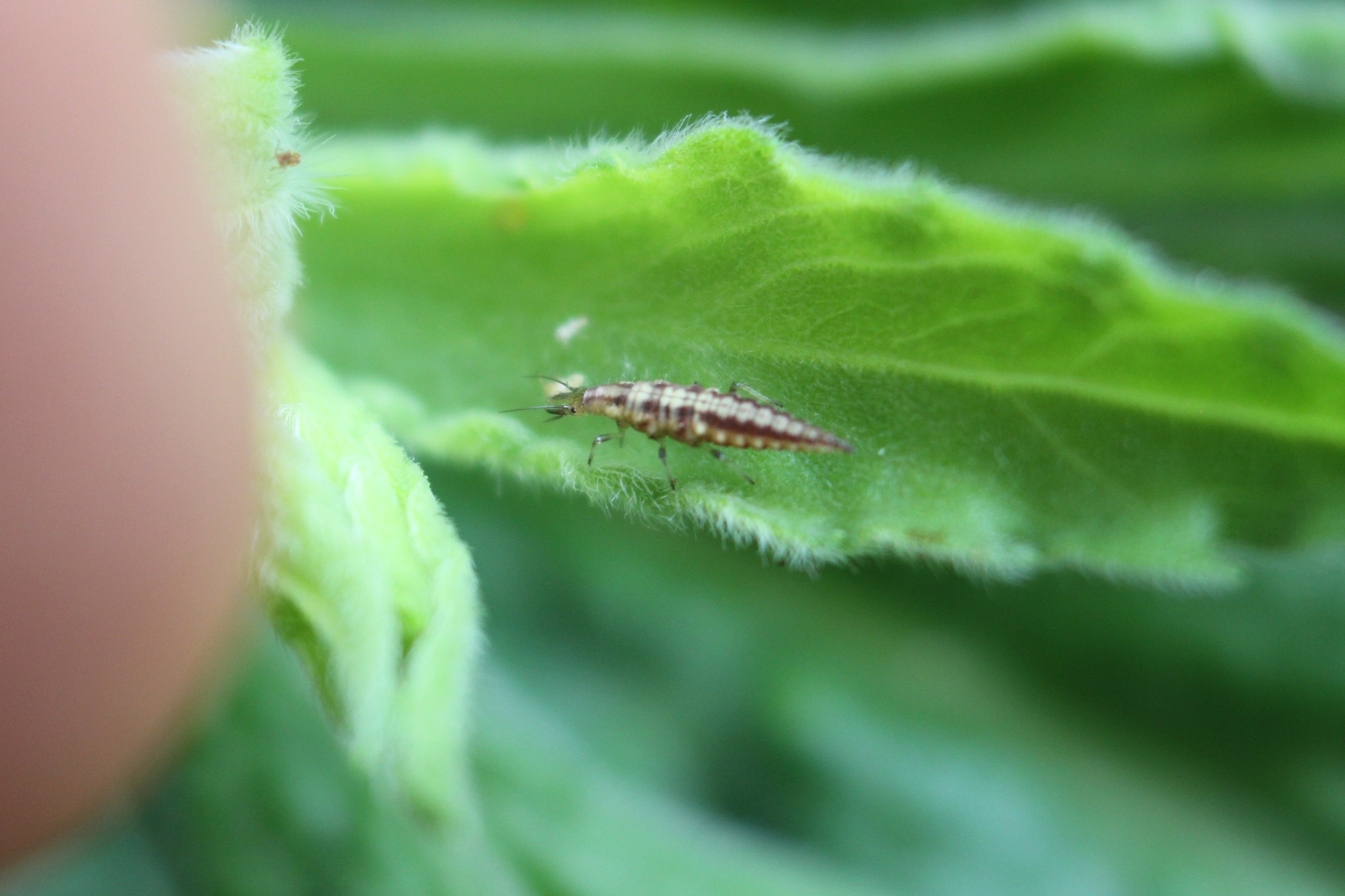
Larval stage
