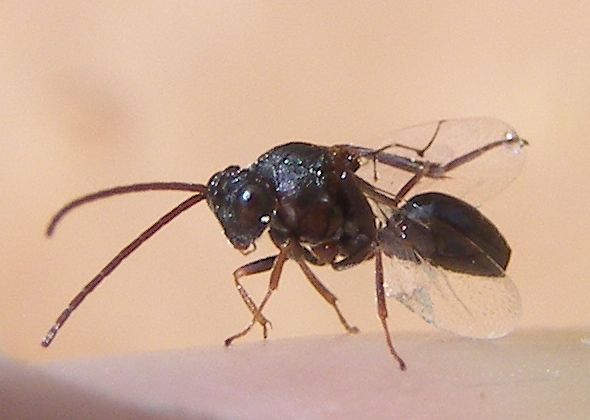
- Callaspidia sp.

Scientific classification
- Kingdom: Animalia
- Phylum: Arthropoda
- Clade: Pancrustacea
- Class: Insecta
- Order: Hymenoptera
- Superfamily: Cynipoidea
- Family: Figitidae; Thomson, 1862

Subfamilies
- See text

= Figitidae =

Family of wasps

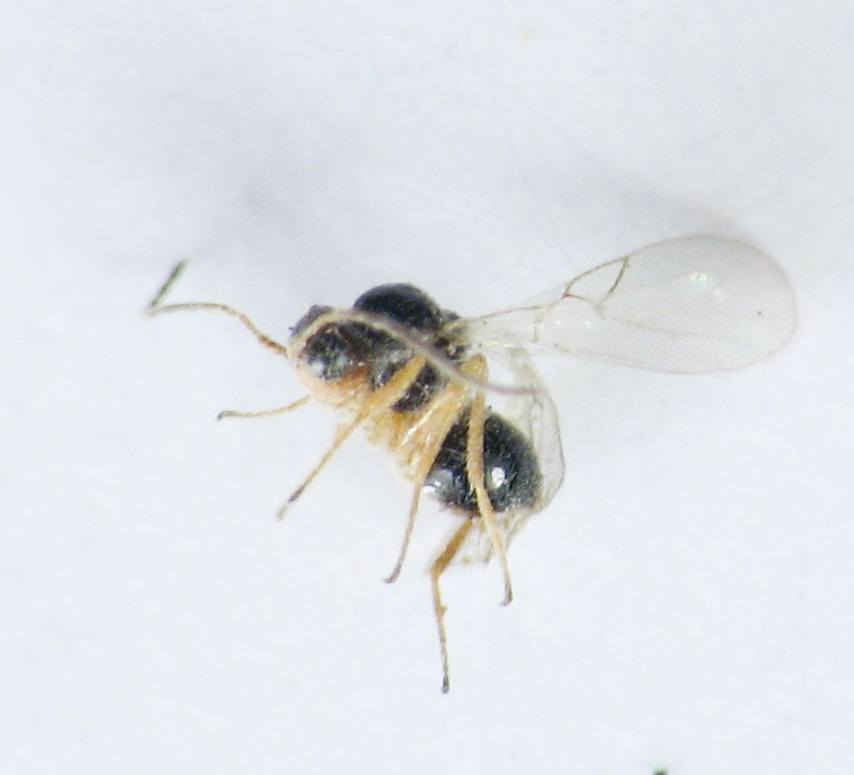
Subfamily Charipinae

Figitidae is a family of parasitoid wasps. The full diversity of this wasp family is not yet known, but about 1400 species have been described to over 130 genera. For example, the largest subfamily, Eucoilinae (previously considered as a separate family, the Eucoilidae), has over 1000 described species so far, but this is probably just a fraction of the total diversity. Figitid species occur throughout most of the world.

Some Figitidae are Drosophila parasitoids, such as the genera Leptopilina, Leptolamina, and Ganaspis.

== Systematics ==
As of 2011, there are 12 subfamilies.

- Anacharitinae
- Aspicerinae
- Charipinae
- Emargininae
- Euceroptrinae
- Eucoilinae
- Figitinae
- Mikeiinae
- Parnipinae
- Plectocynipinae
- Pycnostigminae
- Thrasorinae
