= List of Hemerobius species =

This is a list of 164 species in Hemerobius, a genus of brown lacewings in the family Hemerobiidae.

== Hemerobius species ==
- Hemerobius abditus Tjeder, 1961^{c g}
- Hemerobius adelgivorus Kimmins, 1961^{c g}
- Hemerobius albipennis Banks, 1910^{i c g}
- Hemerobius alpestris Banks, 1908^{i c g}
- Hemerobius angustipennis C.-k. Yang, 1992^{c g}
- Hemerobius anomalus (Monserrat, 1992)^{c g}
- Hemerobius antigonus Banks, 1941^{i c g}
- Hemerobius apatridus Monserrat, 2001^{c g}
- Hemerobius aper Tjeder, 1961^{c g}
- Hemerobius aphidioides Schrank, 1781^{c g}
- Hemerobius aphidivorus Schrank, 1781^{c g}
- Hemerobius atriangulus C.-k. Yang, 1987^{c g}
- Hemerobius atrifrons McLachlan, 1868^{c g}
- Hemerobius atrocorpus C.-k. Yang, 1997^{c g}
- Hemerobius australis Walker, 1853^{c g}
- Hemerobius azoricus Tjeder, 1948^{c g}
- Hemerobius baguiensis Navás, 1923^{c g}
- Hemerobius barkalovi Dubatolov, 1997^{c g}
- Hemerobius betulinus Strøm, 1788^{c g}
- Hemerobius binigripunctatus Fraser, 1957^{c g}
- Hemerobius bispinus Banks, 1940^{c g}
- Hemerobius bistrigatus Currie, 1904^{i c g b}
- Hemerobius bolivari Banks, 1910^{i c g}
- Hemerobius canadai Navás, 1925^{c g}
- Hemerobius centralis Navás, 1913^{i c g}
- Hemerobius ceraticus Navás, 1924^{c g}
- Hemerobius cercodes Navás, 1917^{c g}
- Hemerobius chiangi Banks, 1940^{c g}
- Hemerobius chilensis Nakahara, 1965^{i c g}
- Hemerobius claggi Banks, 1937^{c g}
- Hemerobius coccophagus Göszy, 1852^{c g}
- Hemerobius colombianus Krueger, 1922^{i c g}
- Hemerobius comorensis Krüger, 1922^{c g}
- Hemerobius conjunctus Fitch, 1855^{i c g}
- Hemerobius contumax Tjeder, 1932^{c g}
- Hemerobius convexus Monserrat, 2004^{c g}
- Hemerobius corticus Schrank, 1802^{c g}
- Hemerobius costalis Carpenter, 1940^{i c g}
- Hemerobius cubanus Banks, 1930^{i c g}
- Hemerobius darlingtoni Banks, 1938^{i c g}
- Hemerobius daxueshanus C.-k. Yang, 1992^{c g}
- Hemerobius deceptor Navás, 1914^{c g}
- Hemerobius discretus Navás, 1917^{i c g}
- Hemerobius disparilis Navás, 1936^{c g}
- Hemerobius domingensis Banks, 1941^{i c g}
- Hemerobius dorsatus Banks, 1904^{i c g}
- Hemerobius eatoni Morton, 1906^{c g}
- Hemerobius edui Monserrat, 1991^{c g}
- Hemerobius elatus Navás, 1914^{c g}
- Hemerobius elongatus Monserrat, 1990^{c g}
- Hemerobius exceptatus Nakahara, 1965^{i c g}
- Hemerobius exoterus Navás, 1936^{c g}
- Hemerobius falciger (Tjeder, 1963)^{c g}
- Hemerobius fenestratus Tjeder, 1932^{c g}
- Hemerobius flaveolus (Banks, 1940)^{c g}
- Hemerobius flavus Gmelin, 1790^{c}
- Hemerobius fossilis Weyenbergh, 1869^{c g}
- Hemerobius frontalis Hagen, 1858^{c g}
- Hemerobius fujimotoi Nakahara, 1960^{c g}
- Hemerobius gaitoi Monserrat, 1996^{c g}
- Hemerobius gilvus Stein, 1863^{c g}
- Hemerobius grahami Banks, 1940^{c g}
- Hemerobius greeni Banks, 1913^{c g}
- Hemerobius griseus Fabricius, 1777^{c g}
- Hemerobius hagenii Parfitt, 1860^{c g}
- Hemerobius handschini Tjeder, 1957^{c g}
- Hemerobius harmandinus Navás, 1910^{c g}
- Hemerobius hedini Tjeder, 1936^{c g}
- Hemerobius hengduanus C.-k. Yang, 1981^{c g}
- Hemerobius hernandezi Monserrat, 1996^{c g}
- Hemerobius hespericus Navás, 1931^{c g}
- Hemerobius higginsii Brodie, 1845^{c g}
- Hemerobius hirsuticornis Monserrat & Deretsky, 1999^{c g}
- Hemerobius humulinus Linnaeus, 1758^{i c g b}
- Hemerobius hyalinus Nakahara, 1966^{c g}
- Hemerobius iamaicensis Panzer, 1785^{c g}
- Hemerobius immaculatus Olivier, 1793^{c g}
- Hemerobius incertus Makarkin, 1991^{c g}
- Hemerobius incursus Banks, 1931^{c g}
- Hemerobius indicus Kimmins, 1938^{c g}
- Hemerobius inversus Navás, 1927^{c g}
- Hemerobius jamaicensis Banks, 1938^{i c g}
- Hemerobius japonicus Nakahara, 1915^{c g}
- Hemerobius javanus Krüger, 1922^{c g}
- Hemerobius jucundus Navás, 1928^{i c g}
- Hemerobius kobayashii Nakahara, 1956^{c g}
- Hemerobius kokaneeanus Currie, 1904^{i c g}
- Hemerobius kutsimensis New, 1989^{c g}
- Hemerobius lautus Navás, 1909^{c g}
- Hemerobius lii C.-k. Yang, 1981^{c g}
- Hemerobius longialatus C.-k. Yang, 1987^{c g}
- Hemerobius lutescens Fabricius, 1793^{c g}
- Hemerobius madeirae Tjeder, 1940^{c g}
- Hemerobius marginatus Stephens, 1836^{c g}
- Hemerobius martinezae Monserrat, 1996^{c g}
- Hemerobius maxillosus Lichtenstein, 1796^{c g}
- Hemerobius melanostictos Gmelin, 1790^{c g}
- Hemerobius micans Olivier, 1793^{c g}
- Hemerobius montsae Monserrat, 1996^{c g}
- Hemerobius morobensis New, 1989^{c g}
- Hemerobius nairobicus Navás, 1910^{c g}
- Hemerobius namjagbarwanus C.-k. Yang et al. in Huang et al., 1988^{c g}
- Hemerobius natalensis Tjeder, 1961^{c g}
- Hemerobius nekoi Monserrat, 1996^{c g}
- Hemerobius nemoralis Müller, 1764^{c g}
- Hemerobius nemorensis Kimmins, 1952^{c g}
- Hemerobius niger Uddman, 1790^{c}
- Hemerobius nigrans Carpenter, 1940^{i c g}
- Hemerobius nigricornis Nakahara, 1915^{c g}
- Hemerobius nigridorsus Monserrat, 1996^{c g}
- Hemerobius nigrostigma Monserrat, 1990^{c g}
- Hemerobius nitidulus Fabricius, 1777^{c g}
- Hemerobius obscurus Müller, 1764^{c g}
- Hemerobius ovalis Carpenter, 1940^{i c g}
- Hemerobius pacificus Banks, 1897^{i c g}
- Hemerobius pallidus Uddman, 1790^{c g}
- Hemerobius pallipes Olivier, 1793^{c g}
- Hemerobius parvulus (Rambur, 1842)^{c g}
- Hemerobius pehlkeanus (Krüger, 1922)^{c g}
- Hemerobius pennii Monserrat, 1996^{c g}
- Hemerobius perelegans Stephens, 1836^{c g}
- Hemerobius phaleratus (Schneider, 1847)^{c g}
- Hemerobius pini Stephens, 1836^{c g}
- Hemerobius pinidumus Fitch, 1855^{i c g}
- Hemerobius poppii Esben-Petersen, 1921^{c g}
- Hemerobius productus (Tjeder, 1961)^{c g}
- Hemerobius prohumulinus Makarkin, 1991^{c g}
- Hemerobius punctatus Turton, 1802^{c g}
- Hemerobius radialis Nakahara, 1956^{c g}
- Hemerobius raphidioides Villers, 1789^{c g}
- Hemerobius reconditus Navás, 1914^{c g}
- Hemerobius ricarti Navás, 1925^{c g}
- Hemerobius rizali Banks, 1920^{c g}
- Hemerobius rudebecki Tjeder, 1961^{c g}
- Hemerobius rufescens Göszy, 1852^{c g}
- Hemerobius rufus Villers, 1789^{c g}
- Hemerobius schedli Hölzel, 1970^{c g}
- Hemerobius semblinus Schrank, 1802^{c g}
- Hemerobius shibakawae Nakahara, 1915^{c g}
- Hemerobius signatus Krüger, 1922^{c}
- Hemerobius simulans Walker, 1853^{i c g}
- Hemerobius solanensis Ghosh, 1976^{c g}
- Hemerobius solidarius Monserrat, 1996^{c g}
- Hemerobius spinellus Lichtenstein, 1796^{c g}
- Hemerobius spodipennis C.-k. Yang, 1987^{c g}
- Hemerobius stenopterus Monserrat, 1996^{c g}
- Hemerobius stigma Stephens, 1836^{i c g b}
- Hemerobius striatus Nakahara, 1915^{c g}
- Hemerobius subfalcatus Nakahara, 1960^{c g}
- Hemerobius subtriangulus C.-k. Yang, 1987^{c g}
- Hemerobius tagalicus Banks, 1920^{c g}
- Hemerobius tateyamai Nakahara, 1960^{c g}
- Hemerobius ternarius C.-k. Yang, 1987^{c g}
- Hemerobius tibialis Navás, 1917^{i c g}
- Hemerobius tolimensis Banks, 1910^{i c g}
- Hemerobius triangularis McLachlan in Fedchenko, 1875^{c g}
- Hemerobius trifasciatus Navás, 1932^{c}
- Hemerobius tristriatus Kuwayama, 1954^{c g}
- Hemerobius vagans Banks, 1937^{c g}
- Hemerobius varius Villers, 1789^{c g}
- Hemerobius versicolor Gmelin, 1790^{c g}
- Hemerobius vnipunctatus Müller, 1764^{c g}
- Hemerobius withycombei (Kimmins, 1928)^{i c g}
- Hemerobius zernyi Esben-Petersen, 1935^{c g}

Data sources: i = ITIS, c = Catalogue of Life, g = GBIF, b = Bugguide.net
