= Holarctic realm =

Biogeographic realm

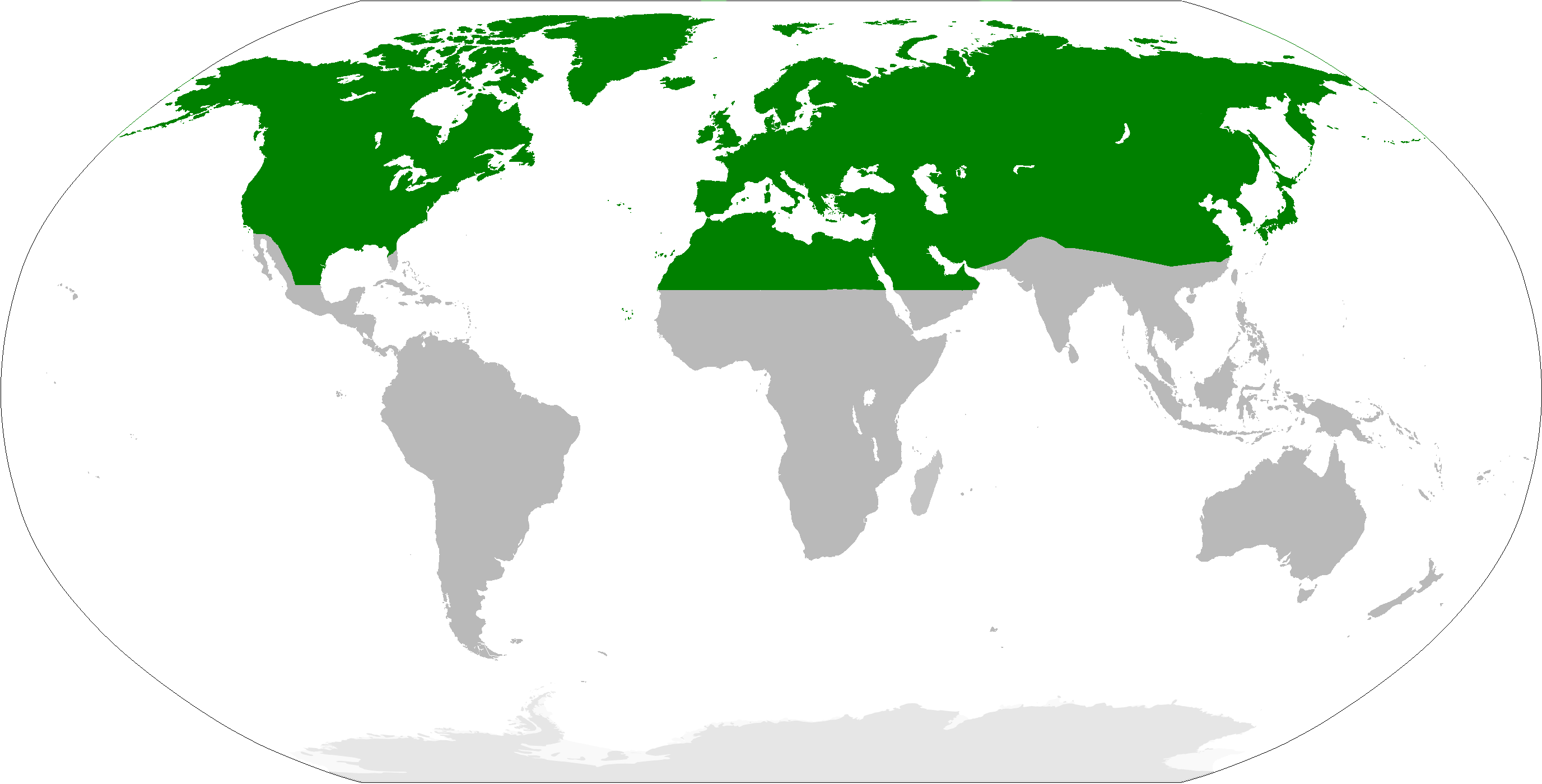
Holarctic realm

The Holarctic realm is a biogeographic realm that comprises the majority of habitats found throughout the continents in the Northern Hemisphere. It corresponds to the floristic Boreal kingdom. It includes both the Nearctic zoogeographical region (which covers most of North America), and Alfred Wallace's Palearctic zoogeographical region (which covers North Africa, and all of Eurasia except for Southeast Asia, the Indian subcontinent, and the southern Arabian Peninsula).

These regions are further subdivided into a variety of ecoregions. Many ecosystems and the animal and plant communities that depend on them extend across a number of continents and cover large portions of the Holarctic realm. This continuity is the result of those regions' shared glacial history.

== Major ecosystems ==
Within the Holarctic realm, there are a variety of ecosystems. The type of ecosystem found in a given area depends on its latitude and the local geography. In the far north, a band of Arctic tundra encircles the shore of the Arctic Ocean. The ground beneath this land is permafrost (frozen year-round). In these difficult growing conditions, few plants can survive. South of the tundra, the boreal forest stretches across North America and Eurasia. This land is characterized by coniferous trees. Further south, the ecosystems become more diverse. Some areas are temperate grassland, while others are temperate forests dominated by deciduous trees. Many of the southernmost parts of the Holarctic are deserts, which are dominated by plants and animals adapted to the dry conditions.

== Animal species with a Holarctic distribution ==
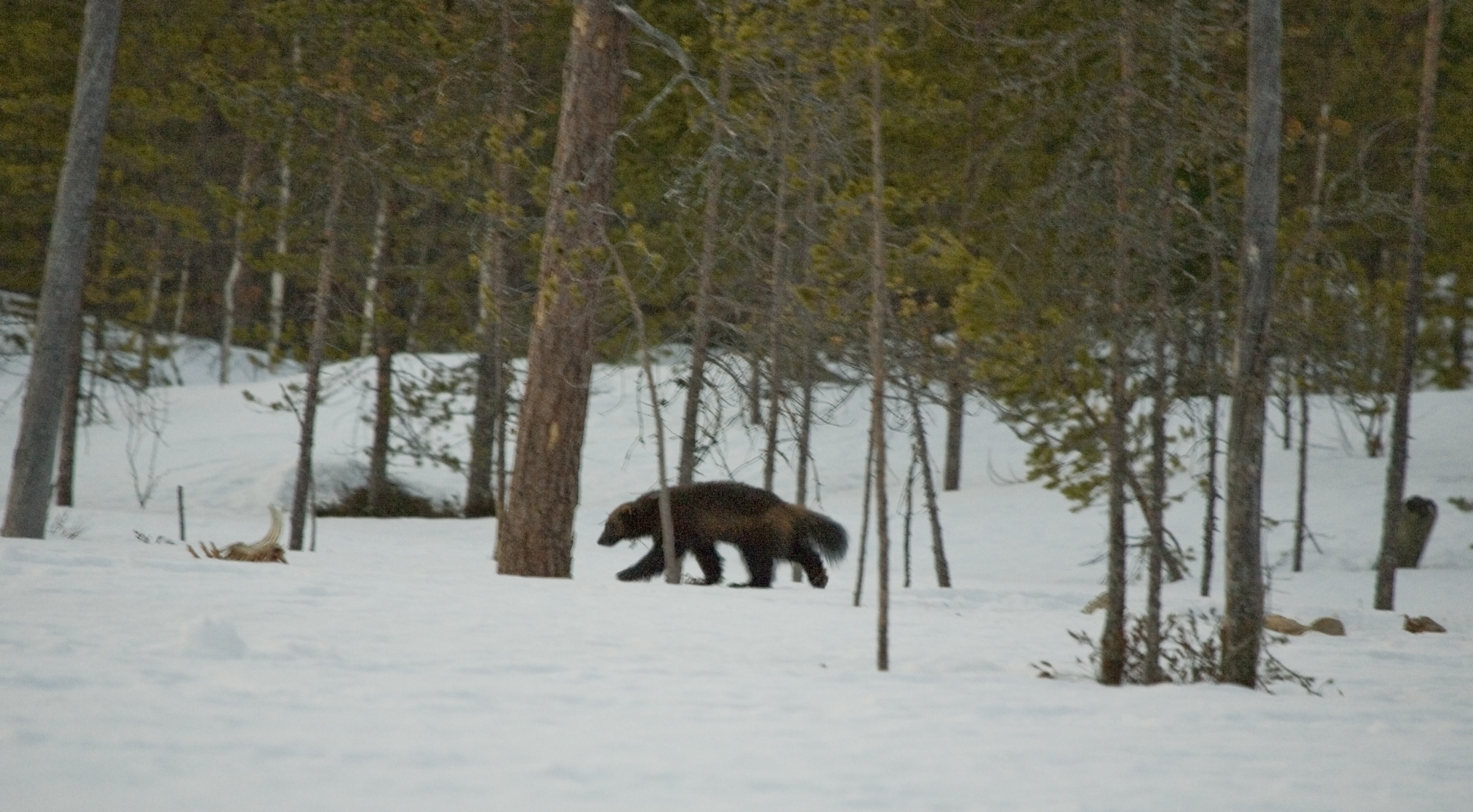
A wolverine (Gulo gulo).

A variety of animal species are distributed across continents, throughout much of the Holarctic realm. These include the brown bear, grey wolf, red fox, wolverine, moose, caribou, golden eagle and common raven.

The brown bear (Ursus arctos) is found in mountainous and semi-open areas distributed throughout the Holarctic. It once occupied much larger areas, but has been driven out by human development and the resulting habitat fragmentation. Today it is only found in remaining wilderness areas.

The grey wolf (Canis lupus) is found in a wide variety of habitats from tundra to desert, with different populations adapted for each. Its historical distribution encompasses the vast majority of the Holarctic realm, though human activities such as development and active extermination have extirpated the species from much of this range.

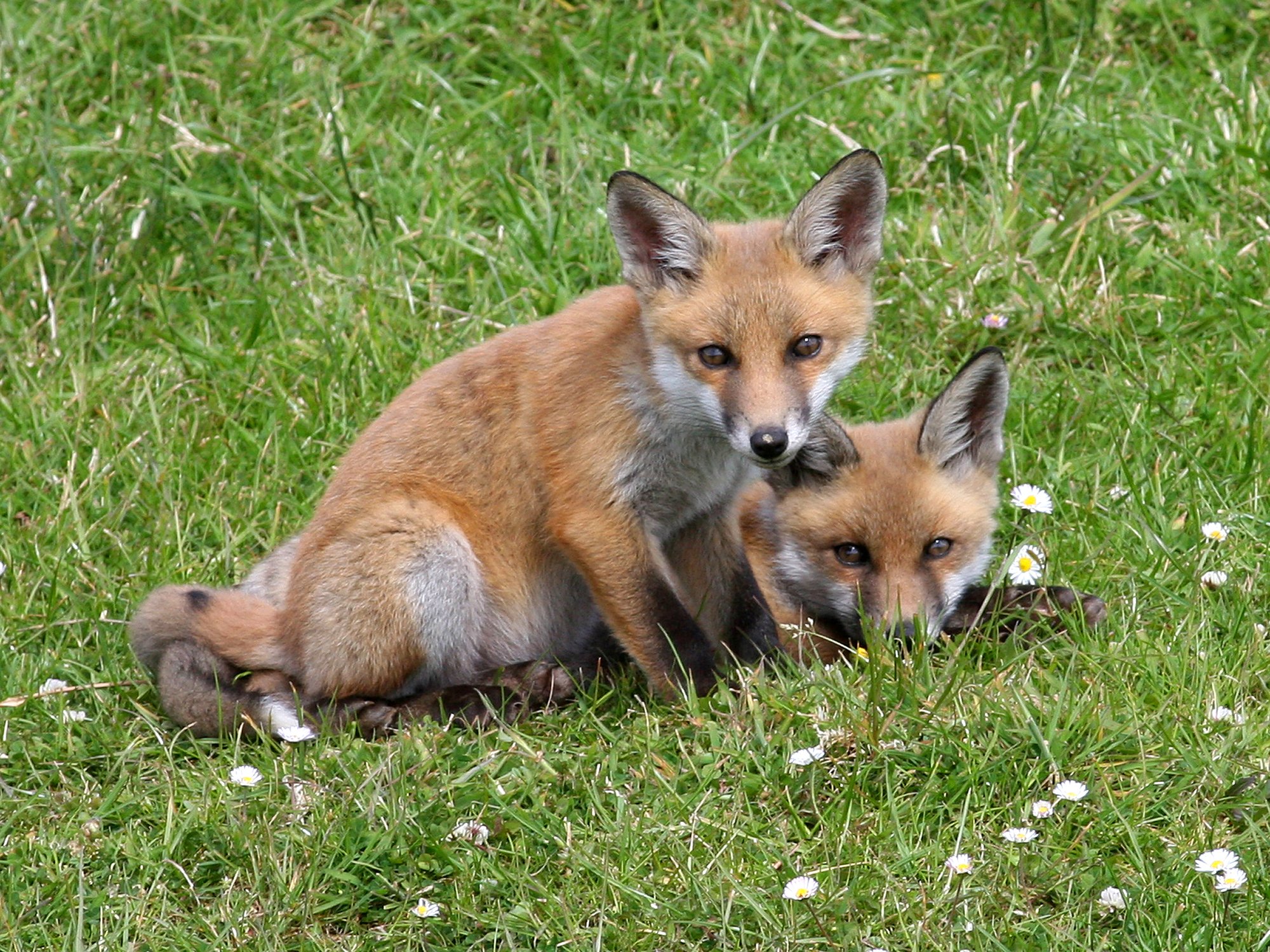
Red foxes (Vulpes vulpes).

The red fox (Vulpes vulpes) is a highly adaptable predator. It has the widest distribution of any terrestrial carnivore, and is adapted to a wide range of habitats, including areas of intense human development. Like the wolf, it is distributed throughout the majority of the Holarctic, but it has avoided extirpation.

The wolverine (Gulo gulo) is a large member of the weasel family found primarily in the arctic and in boreal forests, ranging south in mountainous regions. It is distributed in such areas throughout Eurasia and North America.

The moose (Alces alces) is the largest member of the deer family. It is found throughout most of the boreal forest through continental Eurasia into Scandinavia, eastern North America, and boreal and montane regions of western North America. In some areas it ranges south into the deciduous forest.

The caribou, or reindeer (Rangifer tarandus) is found in boreal forest and tundra in the northern parts of the Holarctic. In Eurasia, it has been domesticated. It is divided into several subspecies, which are adapted to different habitats and geographic areas.

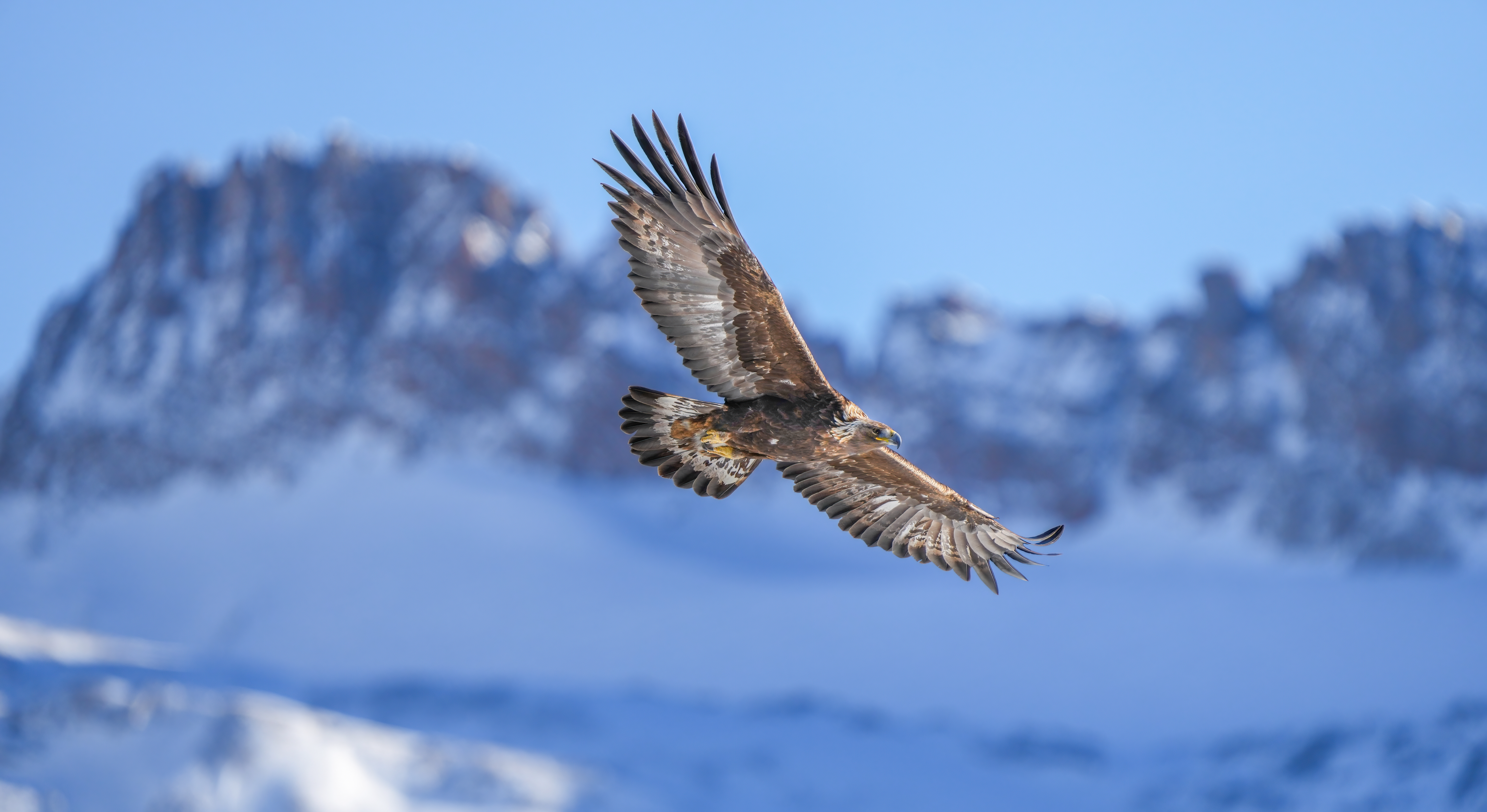
A golden eagle in flight.

The golden eagle (Aquila chrysaetos) is one of the best-known birds of prey in the Northern Hemisphere. It is the most widely distributed species of eagle. Golden eagles use their agility and speed combined with powerful feet and massive, sharp talons to snatch up a variety of prey (mainly hares, rabbits, marmots and other ground squirrels).

The common raven (Corvus corax) is the most widespread of the corvids, and one of the largest. It is found in a variety of habitats, but primarily wooded northern areas. It has been known to adapt well to areas of human activity. Their distribution also makes up most of the Holarctic realm.

Leptothorax acervorum is a small red Holarctic ant widely distributed across Eurasia, ranging from central Spain and Italy to the northernmost parts of Scandinavia and Siberia.

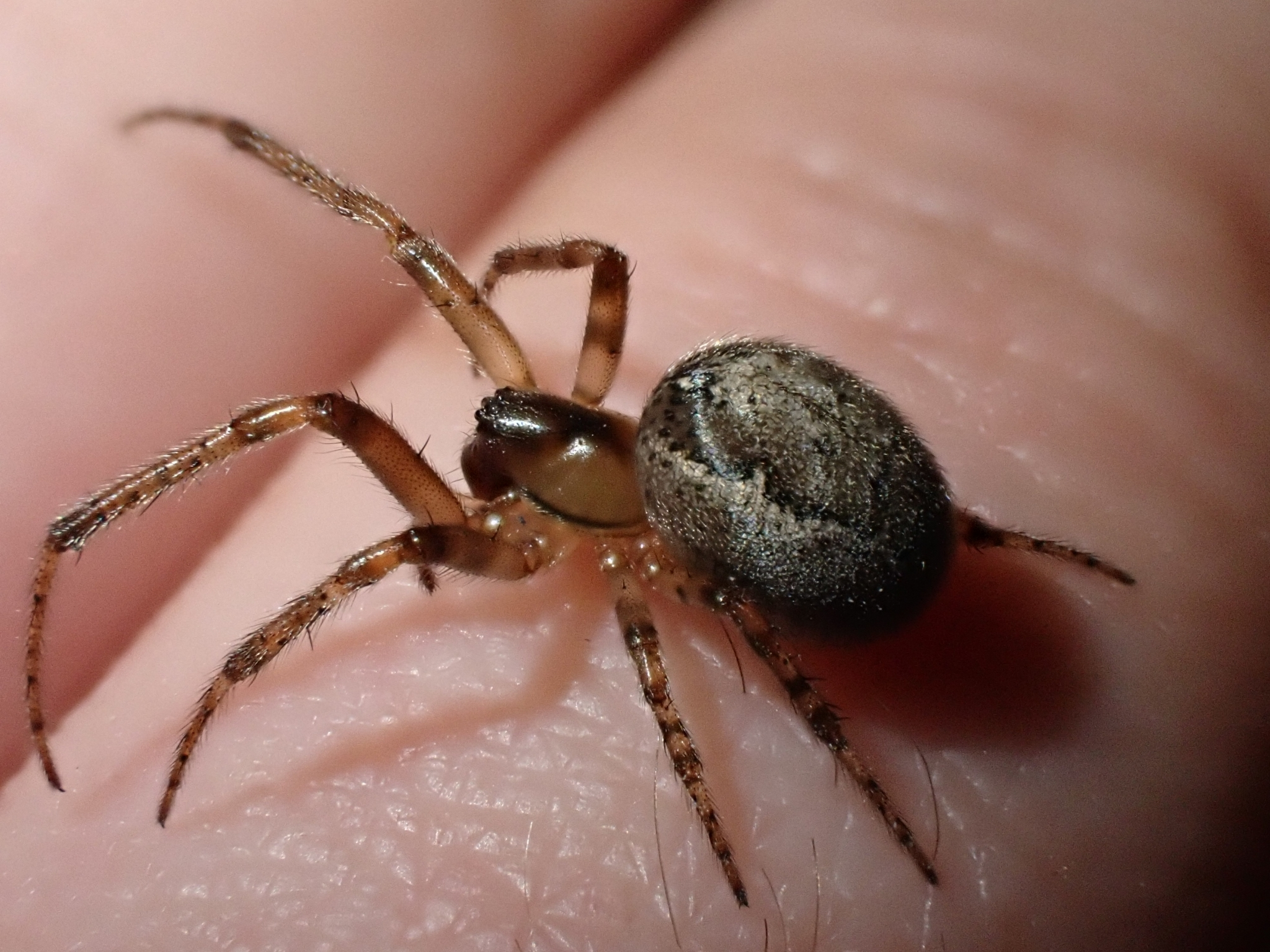
Zygiella x-notata

Zygiella x-notata is a species of orb-weaving spider with a Holarctic distribution, mostly inhabiting urban and suburban regions of Europe and parts of North America.

Hemerobius humulinus is a species of brown lacewing in the family Hemerobiidae. It is found in Europe and Northern Asia (excluding China), North America, and Southern Asia.

== Origin ==
The continuity of the northern parts of the Holarctic results from their shared glacial history. During the Pleistocene (Ice Age), these areas were subjected to repeated glaciations. Icecaps expanded, scouring the land of life and reshaping its topography. During glacial periods, species survived in refugia, small areas that maintained a suitable climate due to local geography. These areas are believed to have been primarily in southern regions, but some genetic and paleontological evidence points to additional refugia in the sheltered areas of the north.

Wherever these areas were found, they became source populations during interglacial periods. When the glaciers receded, plants and animals spread rapidly into the newly opened areas. Different taxa responded to these rapidly changing conditions in different ways. Tree species spread outward from refugia during interglacial periods, but in varied patterns, with different trees dominating in different periods. Insects, on the other hand, shifted their ranges with the climate, maintaining consistency in species for the most part throughout the period. Their high degree of mobility allowed them to move as the glaciers advanced or retreated, maintaining a constant habitat despite the climatic oscillations. Despite their apparent lack of mobility, plants managed to colonize new areas rapidly as well. Studies of fossil pollen indicate that trees recolonized these lands at an exponential rate. Mammals recolonized at varying rates. Brown bears, for instance, moved quickly from refugia with the receding glaciers, becoming one of the first large mammals to recolonize the land. The Last Glacial Period ended about 10,000 years ago, resulting in the present distribution of ecoregions.

Another factor contributing to the continuity of Holarctic ecosystems is the movement between continents allowed by the Bering land bridge, which was exposed by the lowering of sea level due to the expansion of the ice caps. The communities found in the Palearctic and the Nearctic are different, but have many species in common. This is the result of several faunal interchanges that took place across the Bering land bridge. However, these migrations were mostly limited to large, cold-tolerant species. Today it is mainly these species which are found throughout the realm.

== Threats ==
As the Holarctic is an enormous area, it is subject to environmental problems of international scale. The primary threats throughout the region result from global warming and habitat fragmentation. The former is of particular concern in the north, as these ecosystems are adapted to cold. The latter is more of a concern in the south, where development is prevalent.

Global warming is a threat to all the Earth's ecosystems, but it is a more immediate threat to those found in cold climates. The communities of species found at these latitudes are adapted to the cold, so any significant warming can upset the balance. For instance, insects struggle to survive the cold winters typical of the boreal forest. Many do not make it, especially in harsh winters. However, recently the winters have grown milder, which has had a drastic effect on the forest. Winter mortality of some insect species drastically decreased, allowing the population to build on itself in subsequent years. In some areas the effects have been severe. Spruce beetle outbreaks have wiped out up to ninety percent of the Kenai Peninsula's spruce trees; this is blamed primarily on a series of unusually warm years since 1987.

In this case a native species has caused massive disturbance of habitat as a result of climate change. Warming temperatures may also allow pest species to enlarge their range, moving into habitats that were previously unsuitable. Studies of potential areas for outbreaks of bark beetles indicate that as the climate shifts, these beetles will expand to the north and to higher elevations than they have previously affected. With warmer temperatures, insect infestation will become a greater problem throughout the northern parts of the Holarctic.

Another potential effect of global warming to northern ecosystems is the melting of permafrost. This can have significant effects on the plant communities that are adapted to the frozen soil, and may also have implications for further climate change. As permafrost melts, any trees growing above it may die, and the land shifts from forest to peatland. In the far north, shrubs may later take over what was formerly tundra. The precise effect depends on whether the water that was locked up is able to drain off. In either case, the habitat will undergo a shift. Melting permafrost may also accelerate climate change in the future. Within the permafrost, vast quantities of carbon are locked up. If this soil melts, the carbon may be released into the air as either carbon dioxide or methane. Both of these are greenhouse gases.

Habitat fragmentation threatens a wide variety of habitats throughout the world, and the Holarctic is no exception. Fragmentation has a variety of negative effects on populations. As populations become cut off, their genetic diversity suffers and they become susceptible to sudden disasters and extinction. While the northern parts of the Holarctic represent some of the largest areas of wilderness left on Earth, the southern parts are in some places extensively developed. This realm contains most of the world's developed countries, including the United States and the nations of Western Europe. Temperate forests were the primary ecosystem in many of the most developed areas today. These lands are now used for intensive agriculture or have become urbanized. As lands have been developed for agricultural uses and human occupation, natural habitat has for the most part become limited to areas considered unsuitable for human use, such as slopes or rocky areas. This pattern of development limits the ability of animals, especially large ones, to migrate from place to place.

Large carnivores are particularly affected by habitat fragmentation. These mammals, such as brown bears and wolves, require large areas of land with relatively intact habitat to survive as individuals. Much larger areas are required to maintain a sustainable population. They may also serve as keystone species, regulating the populations of the species they prey on. Thus, their conservation has direct implications for a wide range of species, and is difficult to accomplish politically due to the large size of the areas they need. With increasing development, these species in particular are at risk, which could have effects that carry down throughout the ecosystem.

== Conservation actions ==
The threats to the Holarctic realm are not going unrecognized. Many efforts are being made to mitigate these threats, with the hope of preserving the biodiversity of the region. International agreements to combat global warming may help to lessen the effects of climate change on this region. Efforts are also underway to fight habitat fragmentation, both on local and regional scales.

The most comprehensive effort to combat global warming to date is the Kyoto Protocol. Developed countries who sign this protocol agree to cut their collective greenhouse gas emissions by five percent since 1990 by sometime between 2008 and 2012. The vast majority of these nations are found within the Holarctic. Each country is given a target for emission levels, and they may trade emissions credits in a market-based system that includes developing countries as well. Once this period is ended, a new agreement will be written to further mitigate the effects of climate change. The process of drafting a new agreement has already begun. In late 2007, an international meeting in Bali was held to begin planning for the successor to the Kyoto Protocol. This agreement will aim to build on the successes and failures of Kyoto to produce a more effective method of cutting greenhouse gas emissions (UNFCCC). If these efforts are successful, the biodiversity of the Holarctic and the rest of the world will see fewer effects of climate change.

Fighting habitat fragmentation is a major challenge in conserving the wide-ranging species of the Holarctic. Some efforts are limited to a local scale of protection, while others are regional in scope. Local efforts include creating reserves and establishing safe routes for animals to cross roads and other human-made barriers. Regional efforts to combat habitat fragmentation take a broader scope.

One major such effort in the Holarctic is the Yellowstone to Yukon Conservation Initiative. This organization was started in 1997 to help establish a contiguous network of protection for the northern Rocky Mountains, from mid Wyoming to the border between Alaska and Canada's Yukon. It brings together a wide variety of environmental organizations for a shared purpose. The goal of the Initiative is to create a core of protected areas, connected by corridors and surrounded by buffer zones. This will build on the many existing protected areas in this region, with a focus on integrating existing and future human activities into the conservation plan rather than seeking to exclude them (Yellowstone to Yukon). If these efforts are successful, they will be especially beneficial to wide-ranging species such as grizzly bears. If these species can survive, other members of the communities they live in will survive as well.
