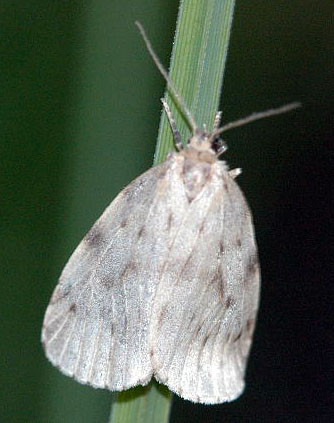

Scientific classification
- Kingdom: Animalia
- Phylum: Arthropoda
- Clade: Pancrustacea
- Class: Insecta
- Order: Lepidoptera
- Superfamily: Noctuoidea
- Family: Erebidae
- Subfamily: Arctiinae
- Genus: Nudaria
- Species: N. mundana

Binomial name
- Nudaria mundana (Linnaeus, 1761)

Synonyms
- Phalaena mundana Linnaeus, 1761; Phalaena pallium transparens Retzius, 1783; Phalaena munda Fabricius, 1793; Bombyx nuda Hübner, [1803]; Bombyx hemerobia Hübner, [1803]; Nudaria mundana var. alpina Uffeln, 1912

= Nudaria mundana =

Muslin footman

Species of moth

Nudaria mundana, the muslin footman, is a moth of the subfamily Arctiinae. The species was first described by Carl Linnaeus in 1761. It is found in Europe and Anatolia.

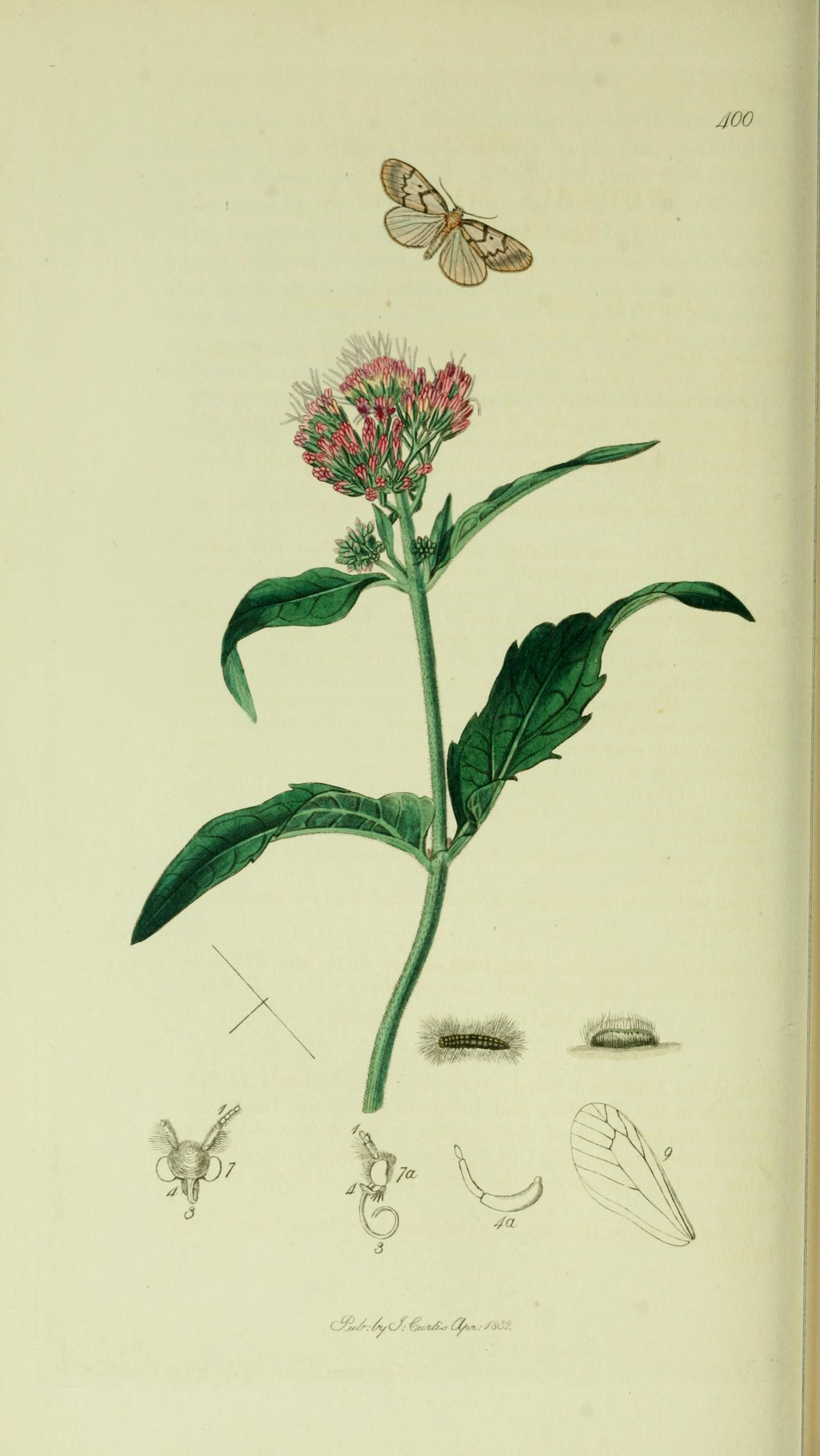
Illustration from John Curtis's British Entomology Volume 5

== Technical description and variation ==
The wingspan is 19–23 mm. The length of the forewings 10–12 mm. Body and wings dull smoky brown, wings semidiaphanous. Forewing with dark dot at the base, and two dark dentate lines before and beyond the centre, between which there is a dark central spot in the cell. Especially transparent specimens, which occur everywhere together with true mundana, are called ab. dilucida Spul.

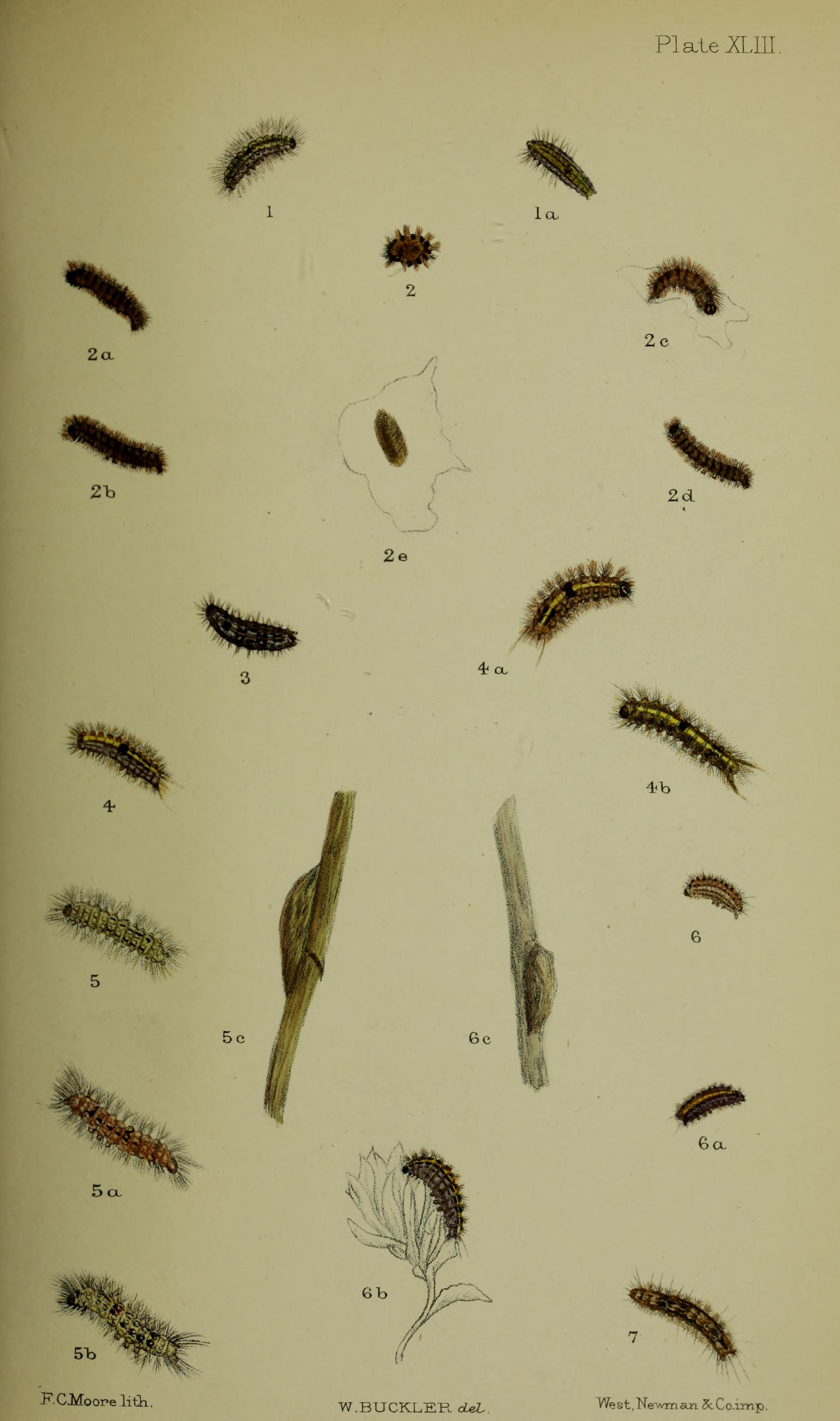
Fig.1a, 1b larvae after last moult

== Biology ==
The moth flies from June to August depending on the location. The moths on the wings strongly resemble neuropterids of the chrysopid genus Hemerobius.

The egg is yellow. The larva is transparent glossy lead grey or greenish, with fine hairs, which are longer and arranged in tufts anteriorly and posteriorly: the head black. Dorsally there are light spots, before and below which stand black markings. The larvae feed on lichen and other mosses. The pupa is transparent greenish white, later yellowish, with deep black eyes and small minute dark dots on the back, in a loose cocoon which is protected by the hairs woven into it and is attached under rocks and flat stones.
