= Nudaria margaritacea =

Scientific classification
- Kingdom: Animalia
- Phylum: Arthropoda
- Class: Insecta
- Order: Lepidoptera
- Superfamily: Noctuoidea
- Family: Erebidae
- Subfamily: Arctiinae
- Genus: Nudaria
- Species: N. margaritacea

Binomial name
- Nudaria margaritacea Walker, [1865]

Synonyms
- Nudaria margaritaria Walker, [1865]

Species of moth

Nudaria margaritacea is a moth of the subfamily Arctiinae first described by Francis Walker in 1865. It is found in Tibet and Sikkim, India.
