= Nudaria mollis =

Scientific classification
- Domain: Eukaryota
- Kingdom: Animalia
- Phylum: Arthropoda
- Class: Insecta
- Order: Lepidoptera
- Superfamily: Noctuoidea
- Family: Erebidae
- Subfamily: Arctiinae
- Genus: Nudaria
- Species: N. mollis

Binomial name
- Nudaria mollis T. P. Lucas, 1894

Synonyms
- Psilopepla mollis

Species of moth

Nudaria mollis is a moth of the subfamily Arctiinae first described by Thomas Pennington Lucas in 1894. It is found in Queensland, Australia.
