= Nudaria fumidisca =

Scientific classification
- Kingdom: Animalia
- Phylum: Arthropoda
- Class: Insecta
- Order: Lepidoptera
- Superfamily: Noctuoidea
- Family: Erebidae
- Subfamily: Arctiinae
- Genus: Nudaria
- Species: N. fumidisca

Binomial name
- Nudaria fumidisca Hampson, 1896

Species of moth

Nudaria fumidisca is a moth of the subfamily Arctiinae first described by George Hampson in 1896. It is found in the Indian states of Sikkim and Assam.
