= Hemerobius bistrigatus =

Scientific classification
- Domain: Eukaryota
- Kingdom: Animalia
- Phylum: Arthropoda
- Class: Insecta
- Order: Neuroptera
- Family: Hemerobiidae
- Genus: Hemerobius
- Species: H. bistrigatus

Binomial name
- Hemerobius bistrigatus Currie, 1904

Species of lacewing

Hemerobius bistrigatus is a species of brown lacewing in the family Hemerobiidae. It is found in North America.
