= Nudaria idalis =

Scientific classification
- Domain: Eukaryota
- Kingdom: Animalia
- Phylum: Arthropoda
- Class: Insecta
- Order: Lepidoptera
- Superfamily: Noctuoidea
- Family: Erebidae
- Subfamily: Arctiinae
- Genus: Nudaria
- Species: N. idalis

Binomial name
- Nudaria idalis Semper, 1899

Species of moth

Nudaria idalis is a moth of the subfamily Arctiinae. It is found in the Philippines (Luzon).
