= Nudaria discipuncta =

Scientific classification
- Kingdom: Animalia
- Phylum: Arthropoda
- Class: Insecta
- Order: Lepidoptera
- Superfamily: Noctuoidea
- Family: Erebidae
- Subfamily: Arctiinae
- Genus: Nudaria
- Species: N. discipuncta

Binomial name
- Nudaria discipuncta Hampson, 1898

Species of moth

Nudaria discipuncta is a moth of the subfamily Arctiinae first described by George Hampson in 1898. It is found in Bhutan and Assam, India.
