= Nudaria fasciata =

Scientific classification
- Domain: Eukaryota
- Kingdom: Animalia
- Phylum: Arthropoda
- Class: Insecta
- Order: Lepidoptera
- Superfamily: Noctuoidea
- Family: Erebidae
- Subfamily: Arctiinae
- Genus: Nudaria
- Species: N. fasciata

Binomial name
- Nudaria fasciata Moore, 1878

Synonyms
- Nudaria promelaena Hampson, 1896

Species of moth

Nudaria fasciata is a moth of the subfamily Arctiinae first described by Frederic Moore in 1878. It is found in Tibet and the Indian states of Sikkim and Assam.
