= Nudaria unifascia =

Scientific classification
- Kingdom: Animalia
- Phylum: Arthropoda
- Class: Insecta
- Order: Lepidoptera
- Superfamily: Noctuoidea
- Family: Erebidae
- Subfamily: Arctiinae
- Genus: Nudaria
- Species: N. unifascia

Binomial name
- Nudaria unifascia (Inoue, 1980)

Synonyms
- Palaeopsis unifascia Inoue, 1980

Species of moth

Nudaria unifascia is a moth of the subfamily Arctiinae first described by Hiroshi Inoue in 1980. It is found in Japan.
