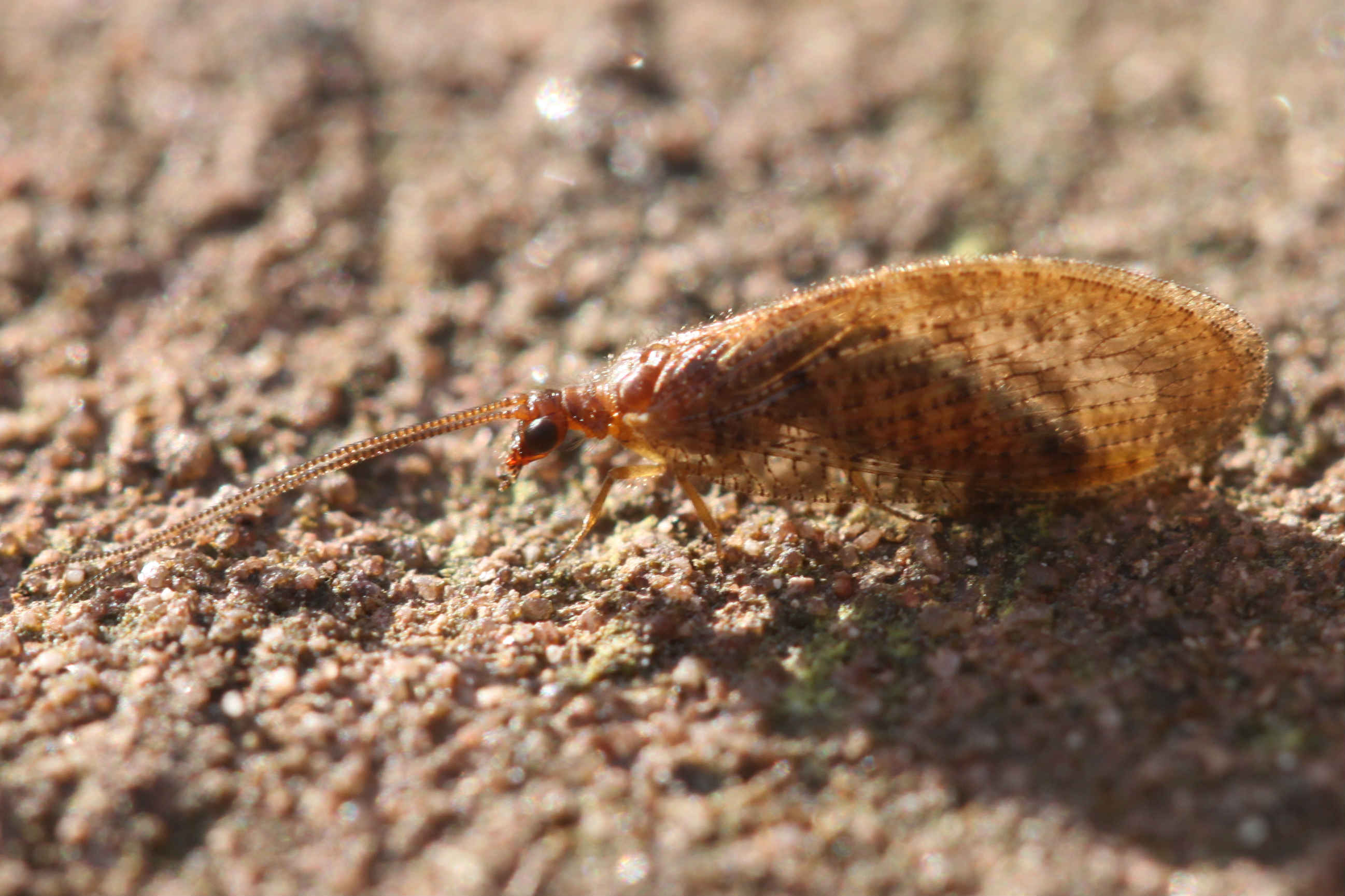

Scientific classification
- Domain: Eukaryota
- Kingdom: Animalia
- Phylum: Arthropoda
- Class: Insecta
- Order: Neuroptera
- Family: Hemerobiidae
- Genus: Hemerobius
- Species: H. stigma

Binomial name
- Hemerobius stigma Stephens, 1836

= Hemerobius stigma =

Species of lacewing

Hemerobius stigma is a species of brown lacewing in the family Hemerobiidae. It is found in Europe and Northern Asia (excluding China) and North America. The species was introduced to New Zealand to prey on adelgidae growing on pine plantations, and was first noted as being present in the country in 1935, however was not able to be established.
