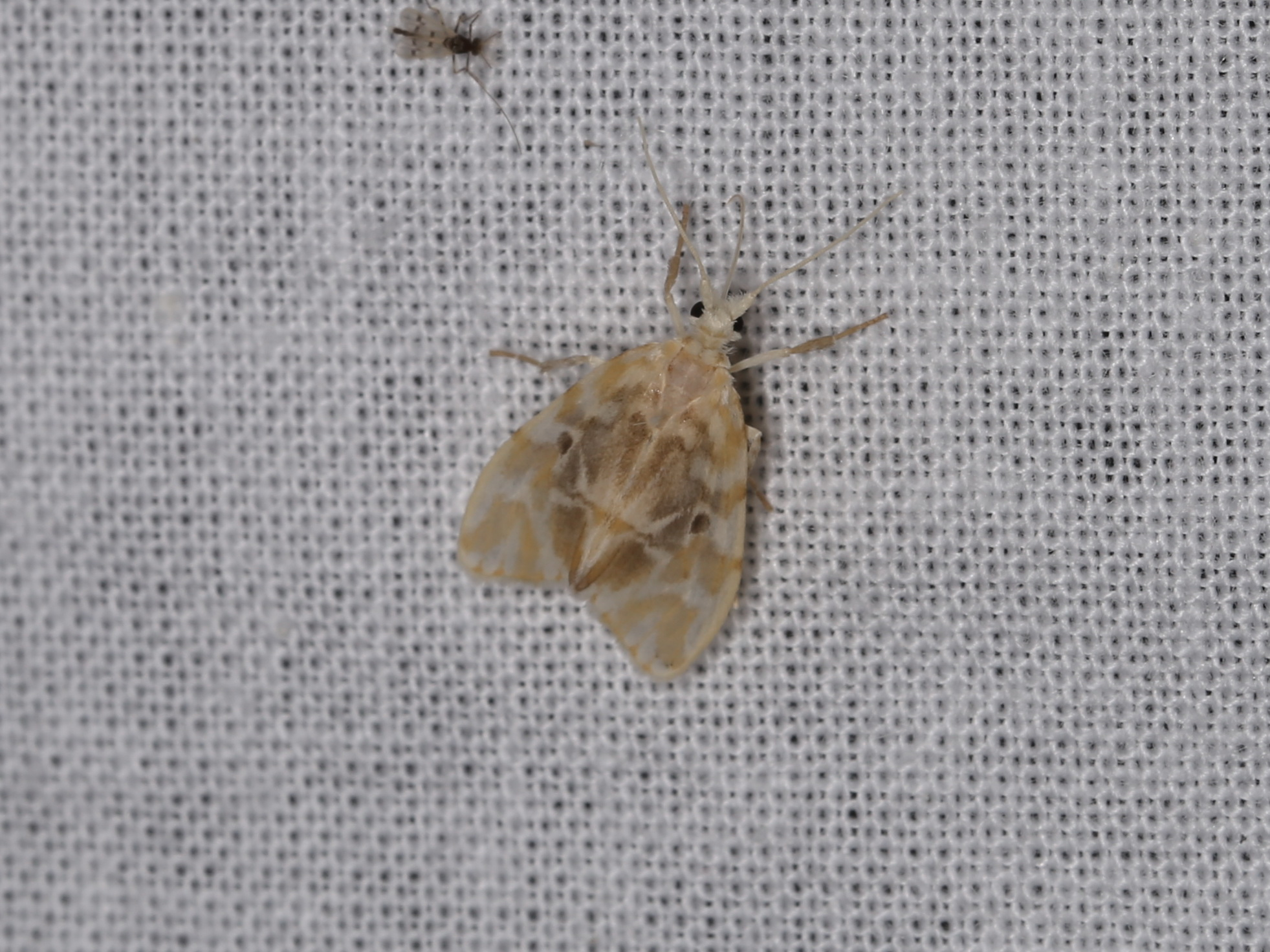

Scientific classification
- Kingdom: Animalia
- Phylum: Arthropoda
- Clade: Pancrustacea
- Class: Insecta
- Order: Lepidoptera
- Superfamily: Noctuoidea
- Family: Erebidae
- Subfamily: Arctiinae
- Genus: Nudaria
- Species: N. phallustortens

Binomial name
- Nudaria phallustortens Holloway, 2001

= Nudaria phallustortens =

Species of moth

Nudaria phallustortens is a moth of the subfamily Arctiinae first described by Jeremy Daniel Holloway in 2001. It is found on Borneo, Peninsular Malaysia and possibly Java.

The length of the forewings is 8–10 mm.
