= Nudaria fulvipicta =

Scientific classification
- Kingdom: Animalia
- Phylum: Arthropoda
- Class: Insecta
- Order: Lepidoptera
- Superfamily: Noctuoidea
- Family: Erebidae
- Subfamily: Arctiinae
- Genus: Nudaria
- Species: N. fulvipicta

Binomial name
- Nudaria fulvipicta Hampson, 1896

Synonyms
- Gymnochroma fulvipicta

Species of moth

Nudaria fulvipicta is a moth of the subfamily Arctiinae. It was described by George Hampson in 1896. It is found in Assam, India.
