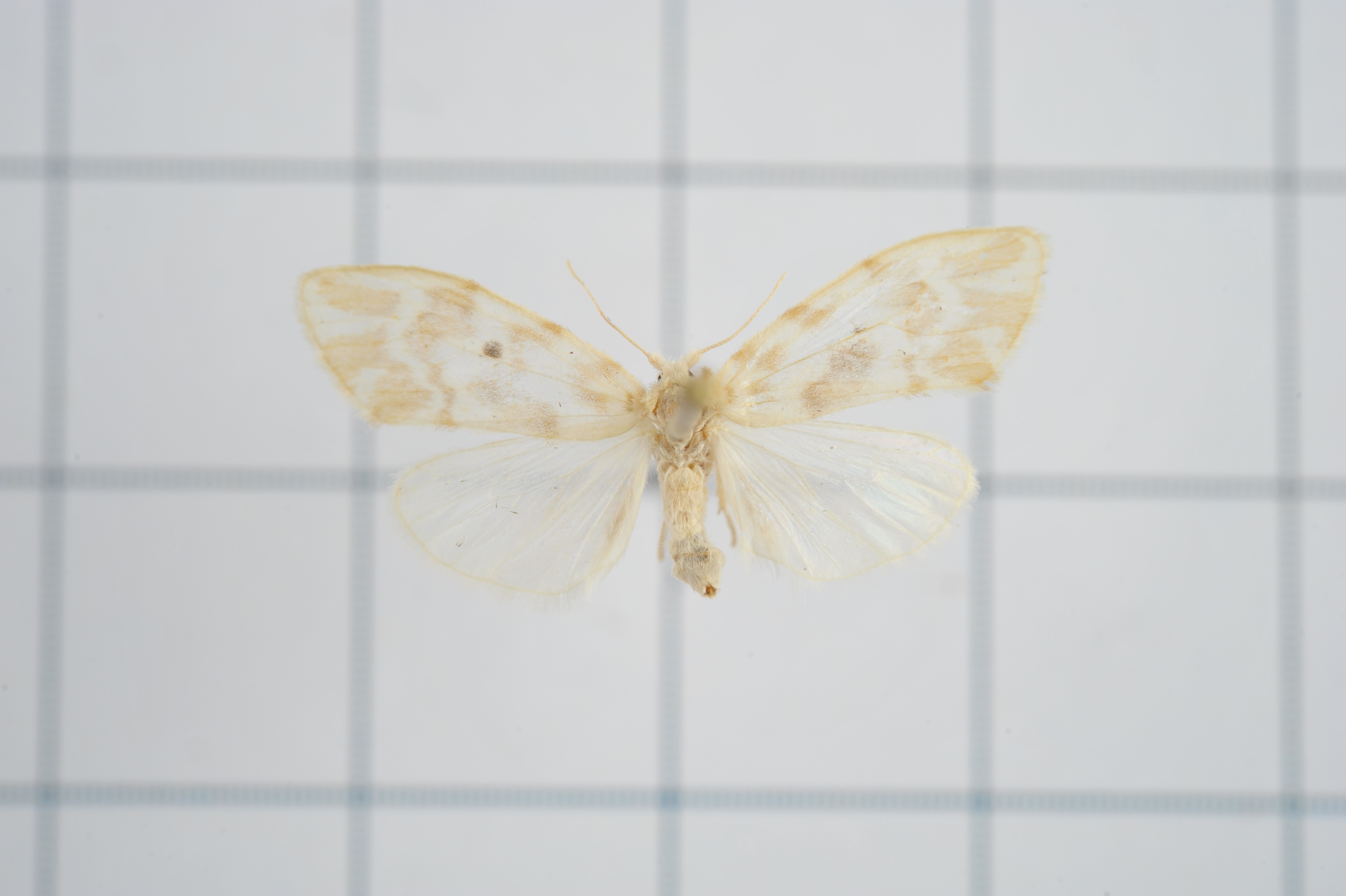

Scientific classification
- Kingdom: Animalia
- Phylum: Arthropoda
- Clade: Pancrustacea
- Class: Insecta
- Order: Lepidoptera
- Superfamily: Noctuoidea
- Family: Erebidae
- Subfamily: Arctiinae
- Genus: Nudaria
- Species: N. ranruna

Binomial name
- Nudaria ranruna Matsumura, 1927

= Nudaria ranruna =

Species of moth

Nudaria ranruna is a moth of the subfamily Arctiinae first described by Shōnen Matsumura in 1927. It is found in Taiwan.
