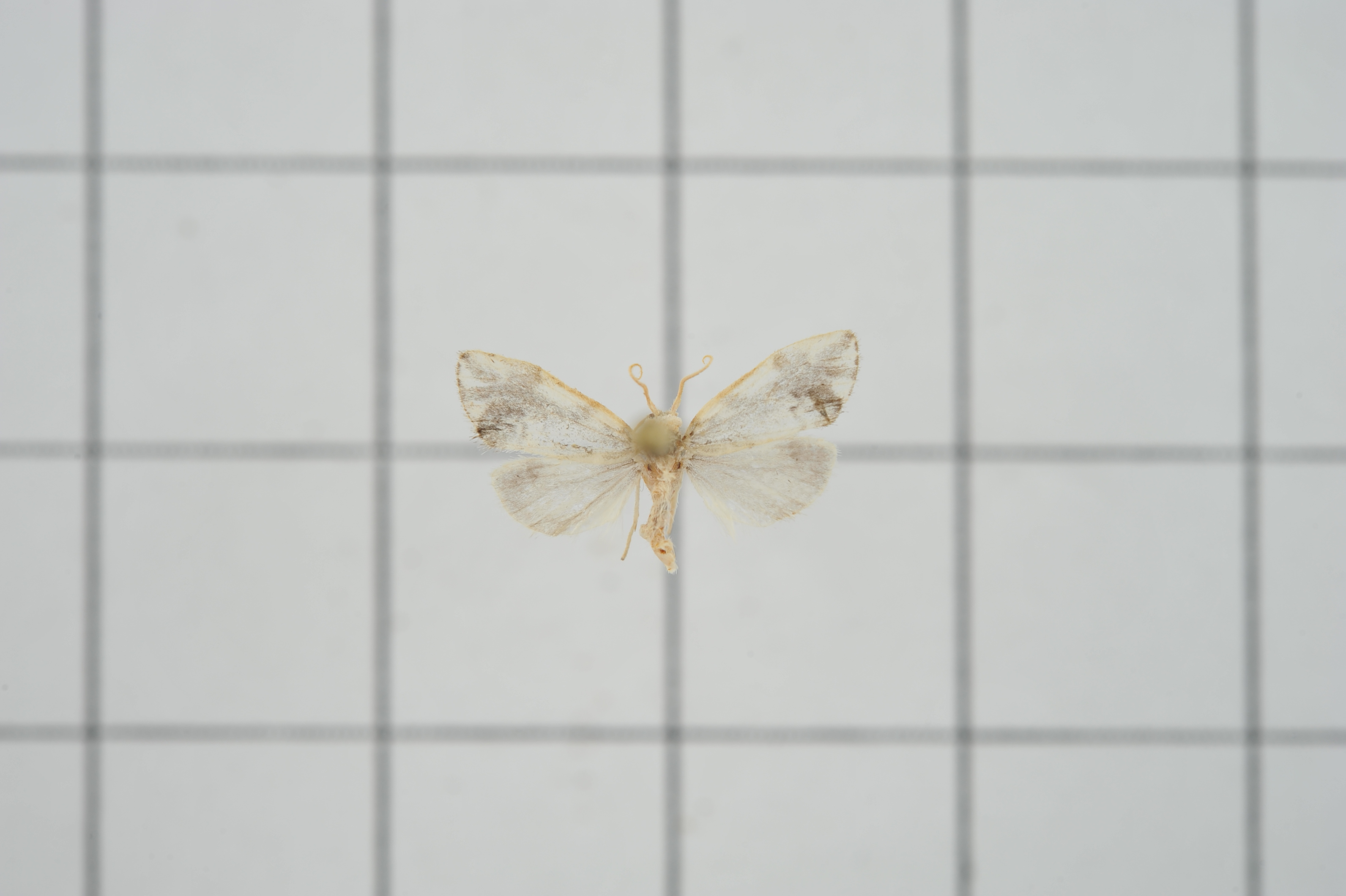

Scientific classification
- Kingdom: Animalia
- Phylum: Arthropoda
- Class: Insecta
- Order: Lepidoptera
- Superfamily: Noctuoidea
- Family: Erebidae
- Subfamily: Arctiinae
- Genus: Nudaria
- Species: N. squamifera

Binomial name
- Nudaria squamifera (Hampson, 1914)

Synonyms
- Palaeopsis squamifera Hampson, 1914

= Nudaria squamifera =

Species of moth

Nudaria squamifera is a moth of the subfamily Arctiinae first described by George Hampson in 1914. It is found in Taiwan.
