= Nudaria mesombra =

Scientific classification
- Kingdom: Animalia
- Phylum: Arthropoda
- Class: Insecta
- Order: Lepidoptera
- Superfamily: Noctuoidea
- Family: Erebidae
- Subfamily: Arctiinae
- Genus: Nudaria
- Species: N. mesombra

Binomial name
- Nudaria mesombra Hampson, 1918

Species of moth

Nudaria mesombra is a moth of the subfamily Arctiinae. It is found in the Philippines.
