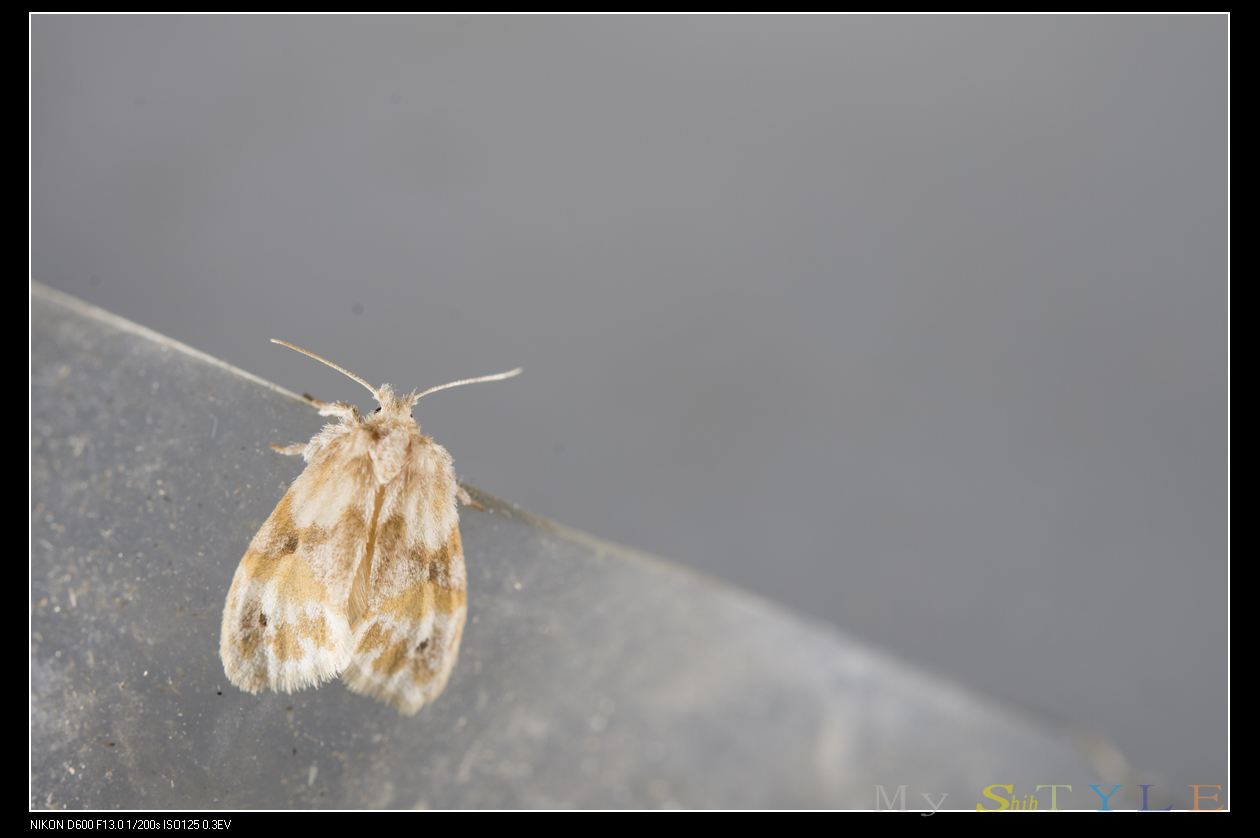

Scientific classification
- Kingdom: Animalia
- Phylum: Arthropoda
- Class: Insecta
- Order: Lepidoptera
- Superfamily: Noctuoidea
- Family: Erebidae
- Subfamily: Arctiinae
- Genus: Nudaria
- Species: N. diaphanella

Binomial name
- Nudaria diaphanella (Hampson, 1893)

Synonyms
- Palaeopsis diaphanella Hampson, 1893

= Nudaria diaphanella =

Species of moth

Nudaria diaphanella is a moth of the subfamily Arctiinae first described by George Hampson in 1893. It is found in Sri Lanka.

== Description ==
Its wingspan is 14 mm. The male has a white body with semi-diaphanous wings. Forewings with subbasal and antemedial brown spots on the costa. A postmedial spot runs a waved line to inner margin. There is an indistinct patch found beyond the cell and three large submarginal spots.
