= Nudaria sundamollis =

Scientific classification
- Kingdom: Animalia
- Phylum: Arthropoda
- Clade: Pancrustacea
- Class: Insecta
- Order: Lepidoptera
- Superfamily: Noctuoidea
- Family: Erebidae
- Subfamily: Arctiinae
- Genus: Nudaria
- Species: N. sundamollis

Binomial name
- Nudaria sundamollis Holloway, 2001

Species of moth

Nudaria sundamollis is a moth of the subfamily Arctiinae first described by Jeremy Daniel Holloway in 2001. It is found on Borneo and Java.

The length of the forewings is 5–6 mm.
