= Nudaria albipunctella =

Scientific classification
- Kingdom: Animalia
- Phylum: Arthropoda
- Class: Insecta
- Order: Lepidoptera
- Superfamily: Noctuoidea
- Family: Erebidae
- Subfamily: Arctiinae
- Genus: Nudaria
- Species: N. albipunctella

Binomial name
- Nudaria albipunctella (Hampson, 1914)

Synonyms
- Palaeopsis albipunctella Hampson, 1914; Palaeopsis sialinella van Eecke, 1926

Species of moth

Nudaria albipunctella is a moth of the family Erebidae first described by George Hampson in 1914. It is found on Borneo, Sumatra and Peninsular Malaysia.
