= Nudaria vernalis =

Scientific classification
- Kingdom: Animalia
- Phylum: Arthropoda
- Clade: Pancrustacea
- Class: Insecta
- Order: Lepidoptera
- Superfamily: Noctuoidea
- Family: Erebidae
- Subfamily: Arctiinae
- Genus: Nudaria
- Species: N. vernalis

Binomial name
- Nudaria vernalis Dubatolov, Kishida & M. Wang, 2012

Species of moth

Nudaria vernalis is a moth of the subfamily Arctiinae. It is found in Guangdong, China.
