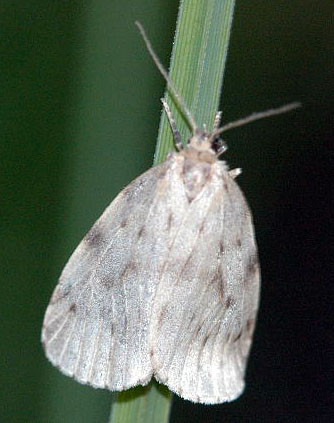
- Nudaria mundana

Scientific classification
- Kingdom: Animalia
- Phylum: Arthropoda
- Clade: Pancrustacea
- Class: Insecta
- Order: Lepidoptera
- Superfamily: Noctuoidea
- Family: Erebidae
- Subfamily: Arctiinae
- Subtribe: Nudariina
- Genus: Nudaria; Haworth, 1809

Synonyms
- Nelopa Billberg, 1820; Amalea Herrich-Schäffer, [1855]; Derrhis Wallengren, 1885; Trichota Rambur, [1866]; Palaeopsis Hampson, 1893; Psilopepla Turner, 1899; Gymnochroma Hampson, 1900

= Nudaria =

Genus of moths

Nudaria is a genus of moths in the subfamily Arctiinae, erected by Adrian Hardy Haworth in 1809.

== Description ==
Palpi are minute and porrect (extending forward). Antennae have a large, swollen basal joint. Tibiae bear short spurs. Forewings possess a long cell; veins 9 and 11 are present. In males, vein 5 often arises from the middle of the discocellulars but is curved if present. Hindwings feature vein 3 arising from before the angle of the cell, vein 5 from above the angle, veins 6 and 7 on a long stalk, and vein 8 from near the end of the cell.

== Species ==
- Nudaria albipunctella (Hampson, 1914) (South-East Asia)
- Nudaria diaphanella (Hampson, 1893) (from Sri Lanka)
- Nudaria discipuncta Hampson, 1898
- Nudaria fasciata Moore, 1878 (from India and Tibet)
- Nudaria fulvipicta Hampson, 1896
- Nudaria fumidisca Hampson, 1896
- Nudaria hirta Haworth, 1809
- Nudaria idalis Semper, 1899
- Nudaria margaritacea Walker, [1865] (from Tibet)
- Nudaria mesombra Hampson, 1918
- Nudaria mollis Lucas, 1894 (from Australia)
- Nudaria mundana (Linnaeus, 1761) – muslin footman
- Nudaria nanlingica Dubatolov, Kishida & M. Wang, 2012
- Nudaria phallustortens Holloway, 2001
- Nudaria punctata (Semper, 1899) (from the Philippines)
- Nudaria quilimanensis Strand, 1922 (from Mozambique)
- Nudaria quilimanicola Strand, 1922 (from Mozambique)
- Nudaria ranruna Matsumura, 1927 (from Taiwan)
- Nudaria squamifera (Hampson, 1914)
- Nudaria suffusa Hampson, 1894 (from India)
- Nudaria sundamollis Holloway, 2001 (from Borneo and Java)
- Nudaria unifascia (Inoue, 1980)
- Nudaria vernalis Dubatolov, Kishida & M. Wang, 2012
