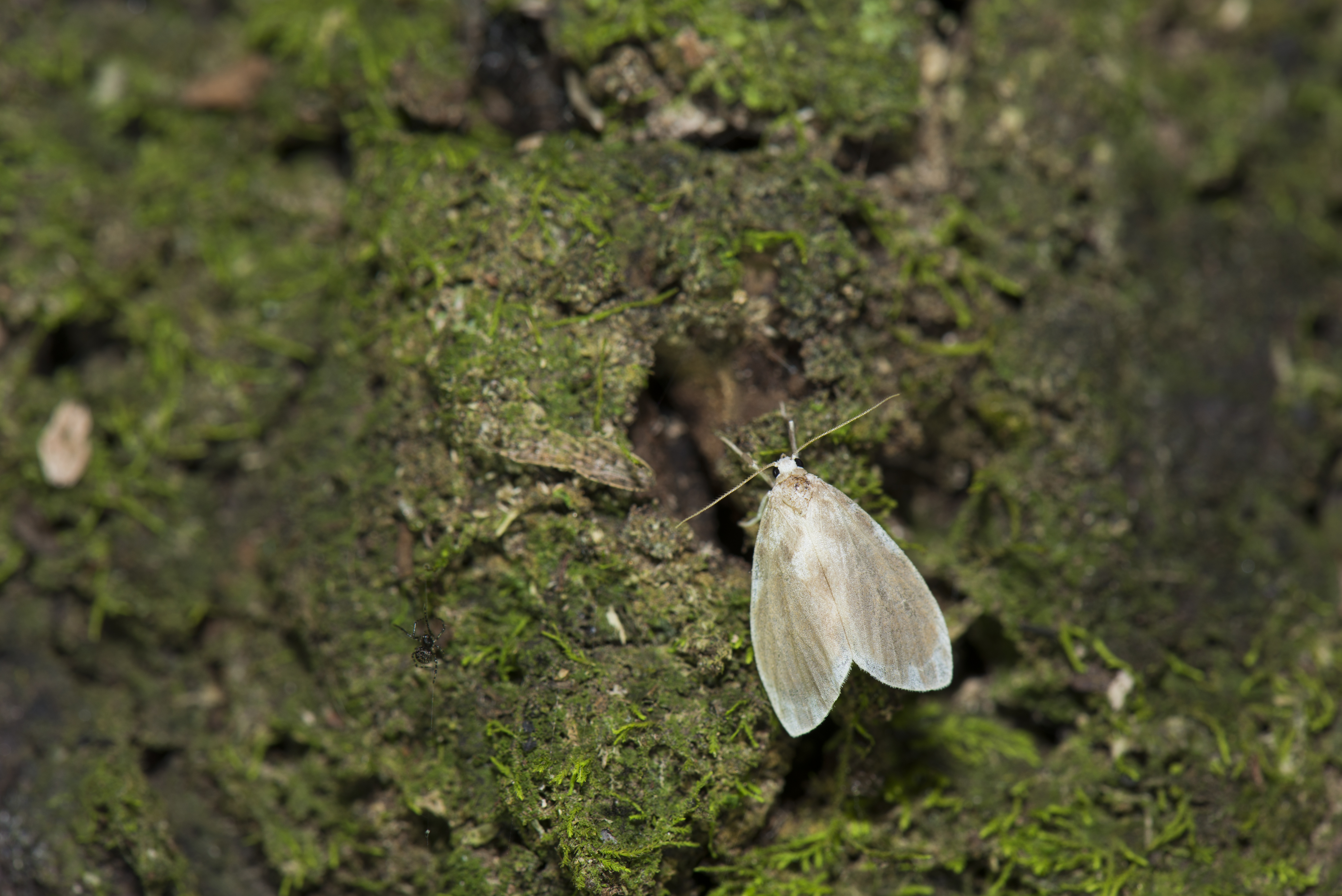
- Nudaria suffusa

Scientific classification
- Kingdom: Animalia
- Phylum: Arthropoda
- Class: Insecta
- Order: Lepidoptera
- Superfamily: Noctuoidea
- Family: Erebidae
- Subfamily: Arctiinae
- Genus: Nudaria
- Species: N. suffusa

Binomial name
- Nudaria suffusa (Hampson, 1894)

Synonyms
- Psilopepla suffusa Hampson, 1894; Palaeopsis suffusa; Nudaria shirakii Matsumura, 1927

= Nudaria suffusa =

Species of moth

Nudaria suffusa is a moth of the subfamily Arctiinae first described by George Hampson in 1894. It is found in the Indian states of Sikkim and Assam.
