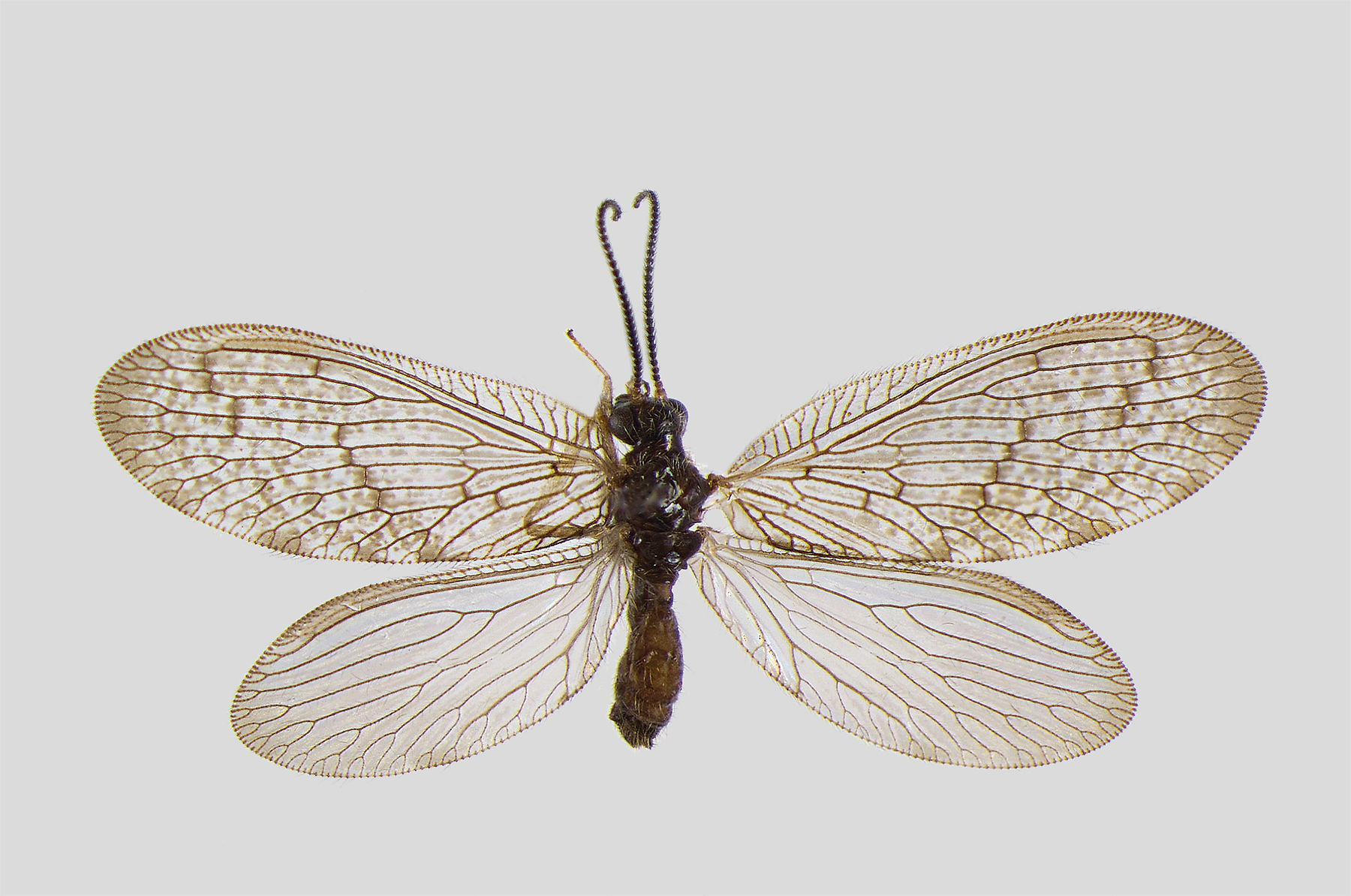

Scientific classification
- Domain: Eukaryota
- Kingdom: Animalia
- Phylum: Arthropoda
- Class: Insecta
- Order: Neuroptera
- Family: Hemerobiidae
- Genus: Sympherobius
- Species: S. elegans

Binomial name
- Sympherobius elegans (Stephens, 1836)

Synonyms
- Hemerobius elegans Stephens, 1836

= Sympherobius elegans =

Species of lacewing

Sympherobius elegans is a species of lacewings.
