= Nudaria punctata =

Scientific classification
- Domain: Eukaryota
- Kingdom: Animalia
- Phylum: Arthropoda
- Class: Insecta
- Order: Lepidoptera
- Superfamily: Noctuoidea
- Family: Erebidae
- Subfamily: Arctiinae
- Genus: Nudaria
- Species: N. punctata

Binomial name
- Nudaria punctata (Semper, 1899)

Synonyms
- Gampola punctata Semper, 1899

Species of moth

Nudaria punctata is a moth of the subfamily Arctiinae first described by Georg Semper in 1899. It is found in the Philippines.
