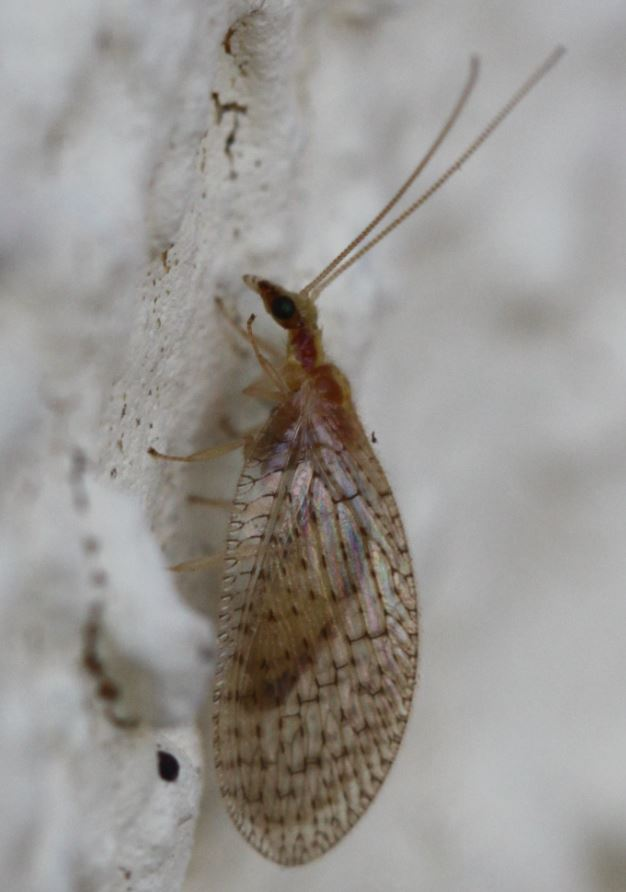

Scientific classification
- Kingdom: Animalia
- Phylum: Arthropoda
- Class: Insecta
- Order: Neuroptera
- Family: Hemerobiidae
- Genus: Hemerobius
- Species: H. humulinus

Binomial name
- Hemerobius humulinus Linnaeus, 1758

= Hemerobius humulinus =

Species of lacewing

Hemerobius humulinus is a species of brown lacewing in the family Hemerobiidae. It is found in Europe and Northern Asia (excluding China), North America, and Southern Asia.

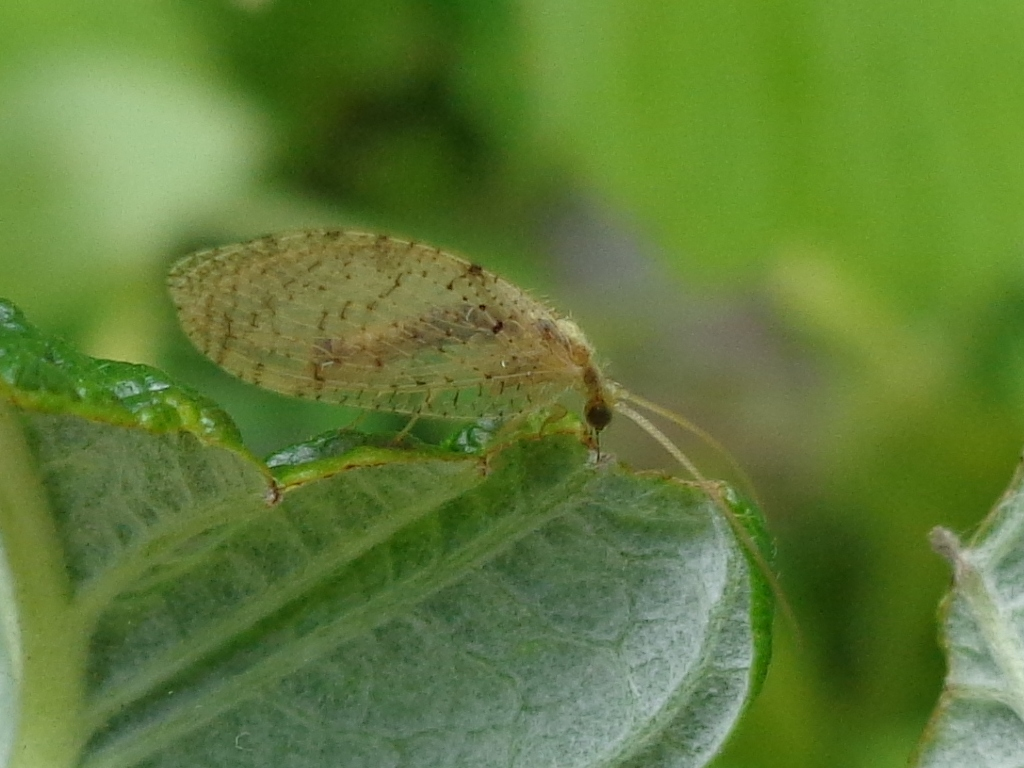

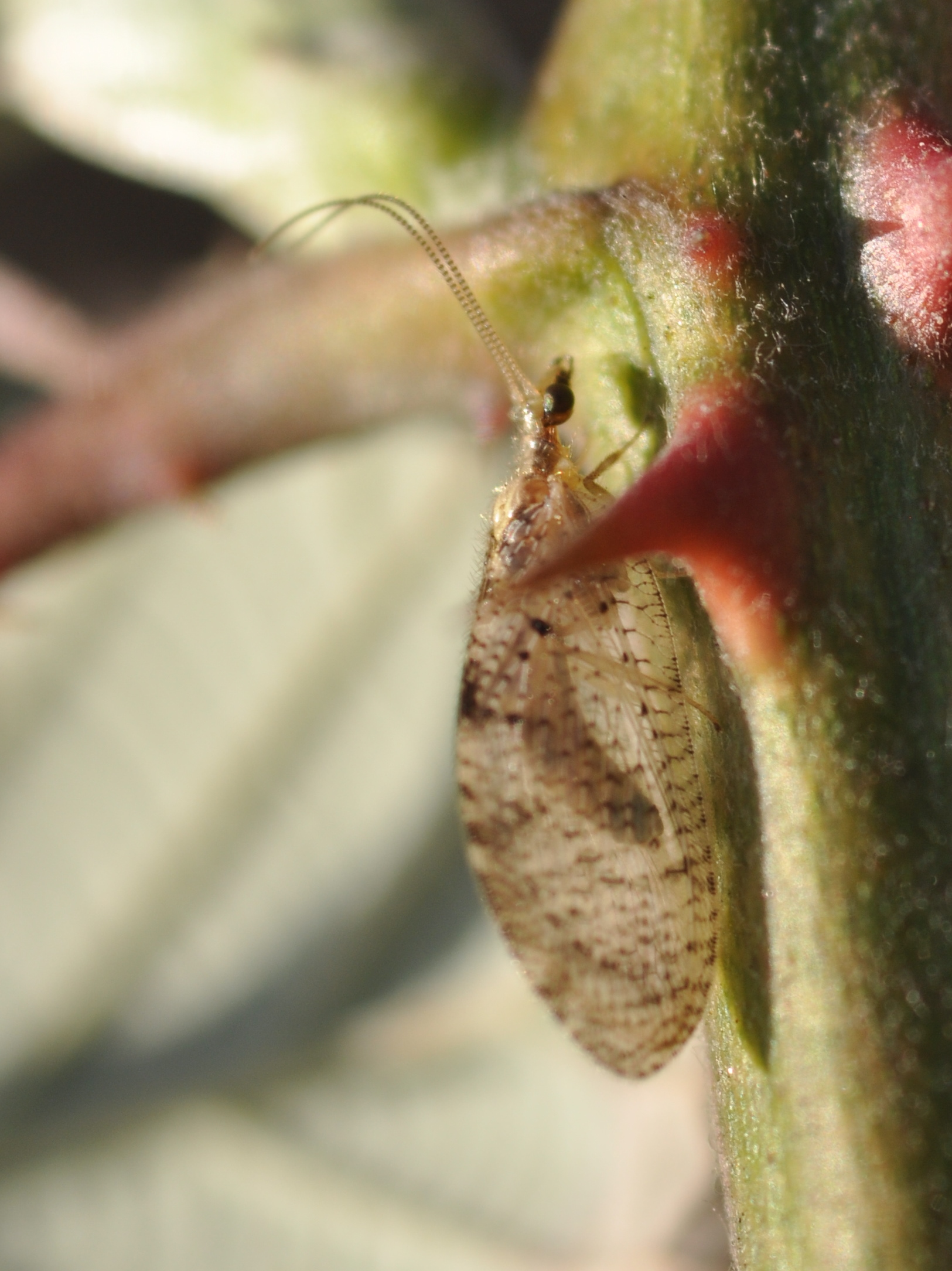
