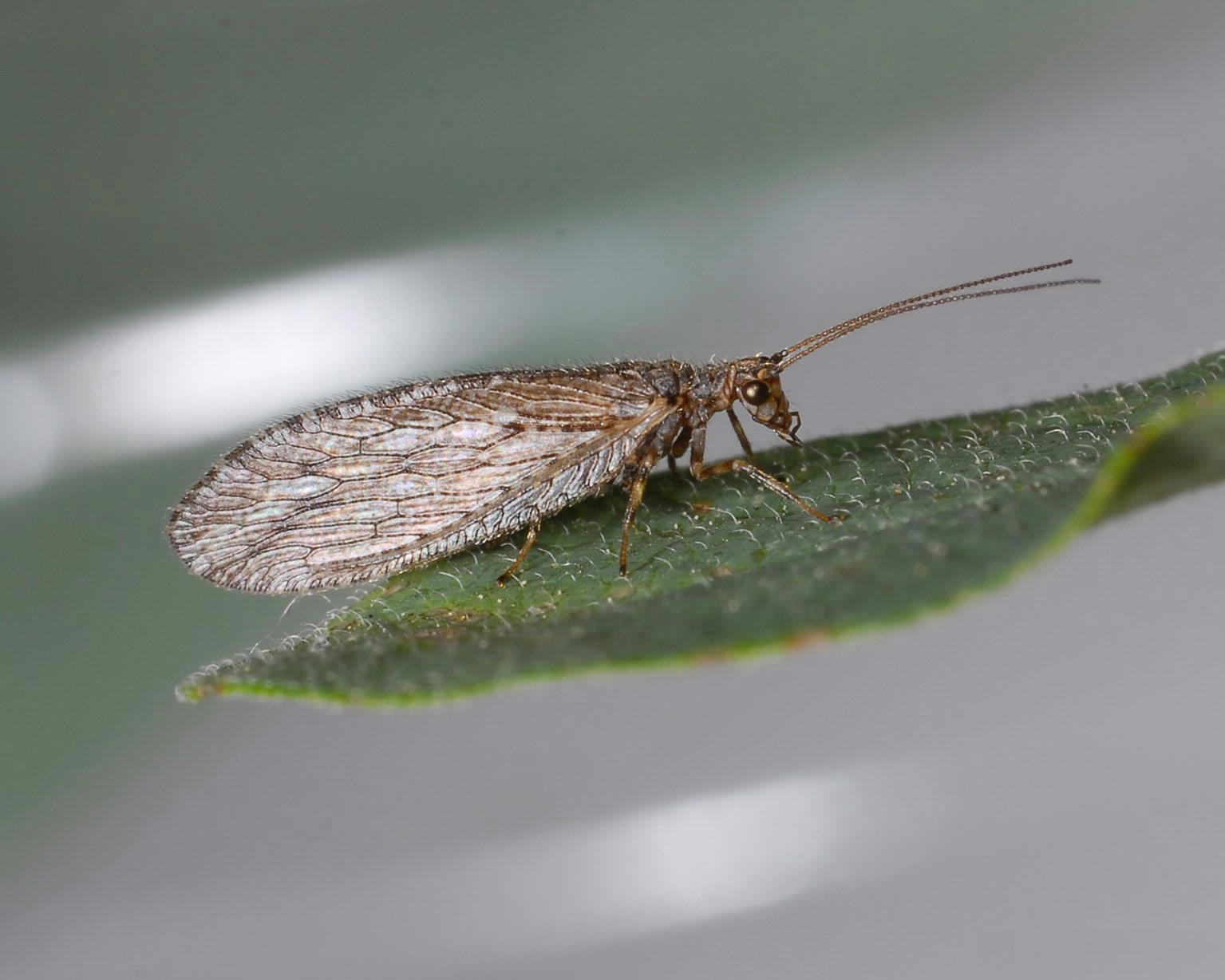
- Hemerobius stigma

Scientific classification
- Kingdom: Animalia
- Phylum: Arthropoda
- Clade: Pancrustacea
- Class: Insecta
- Order: Neuroptera
- Family: Hemerobiidae
- Subfamily: Hemerobiinae
- Genus: Hemerobius; Linnaeus, 1758

Species
- See List of Hemerobius species

= Hemerobius =

Genus of lacewings

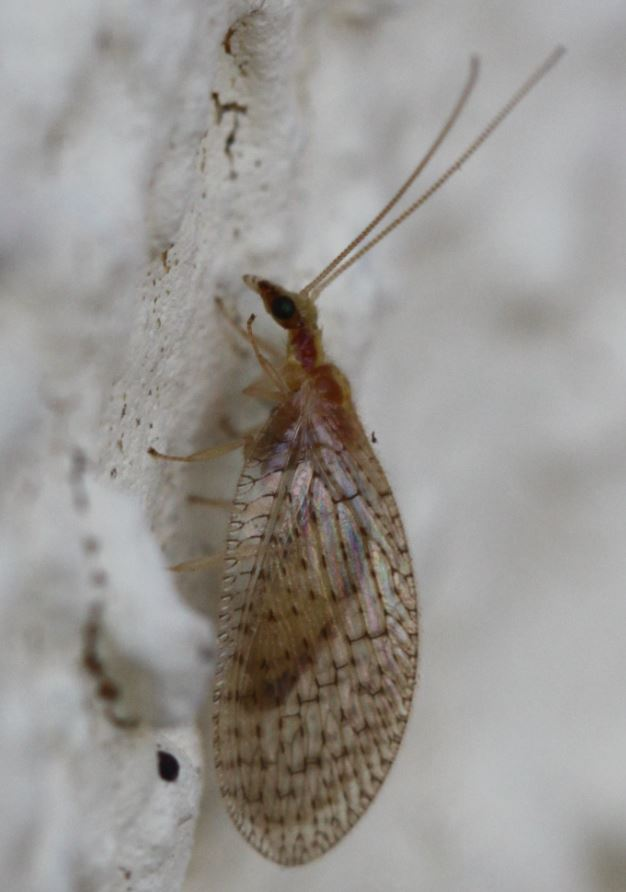
Hemerobius humulinus

Hemerobius is a genus of lacewings in the family Hemerobiidae. It is found throughout Europe and North America. Like most lacewings, both the larvae and adults are predatory, primarily eating acarines, scale insects, psyllids, aphids, thrips, and the eggs of lepidopterans and whiteflies.

Names brought to synonymy

- Hemerobius elegans Stephens, 1836 (currently Sympherobius elegans)
- Hemerobius elegans Guérin-Méneville, 1844 (currently Vieira elegans)

== See also ==
- List of Hemerobius species
