= William Tietz =

American veterinarian (1927–2020)

9th President of Montana State University
- In office August 1977 – December 1990
- Preceded by: Carl W. McIntosh
- Succeeded by: Michael P. Malone

Personal details
- Born: William John Tietz Jr. March 6, 1927 Chicago, Illinois, United States
- Died: June 10, 2020 (aged 93)
- Spouse(s): Patricia Wells; Gwen Massey Tietz
- Children: William John Tietz III ("John"), Karyn, Julia
- Education: Swarthmore College (BA); University of Wisconsin (MS); Colorado State University (DVM); Purdue University (Ph.D.)
- Profession: Professor of Veterinary Medicine
- Website: www.montana.edu

William John Tietz Jr. (pronounced TEE-tz; March 6, 1927 – June 10, 2020) was an American veterinarian who was Dean of the College of Veterinary Medicine and Biomedical Sciences at Colorado State University from 1971 to 1977 and president of Montana State University from 1977 to 1990. A group of historians named Tietz one of Montana State's four most important presidents in 2011.

== Early life and education ==
William Tietz was born in 1927 in Chicago, Illinois, the son of Irma Helen (Neuman) and William John Tietz. He grew up in nearby Hinsdale, and graduated from Hinsdale Central High School in 1945.

After 6 years in the United States Navy, he enrolled at Swarthmore College in Pennsylvania, where he ran track and was on the social committee. He graduated with a bachelor's degree in zoology in 1950. He immediately enrolled at the University of Wisconsin and graduated with a master's degree in zoology in 1952. He briefly studied the metabolism of small animals in arctic conditions in Alaska, and was employed for a short time by Baxter Laboratories in Illinois. He then entered the College of Veterinary Medicine at Colorado State University, and earned his doctor of veterinary medicine in 1957. He immediately pursued a doctorate in physiology and pathology at the Purdue University School of Veterinary Science and Medicine, graduating in 1961.

== Academic career ==
After receiving his doctorate, Tietz was appointed assistant professor of veterinary physiology at Purdue. He left in 1964 to take a position as an associate professor of radiobiology and physiology at Colorado State University (CSU). He was appointed Chair of the Department of Physiology and Biophysics on March 15, 1967. He later also was named the associate director of the CSU Agricultural Experiment Station. He was appointed CSU's Vice President for Student-University Relations in 1970. He served in the position for a year, during which time he acted as liaison between students and the university in an attempt to keep student unrest low. On September 1, 1971, he was appointed Dean of the CSU College of Veterinary Medicine and Biomedical Sciences. While dean, he helped found a program whereby Montana State University students could begin their veterinary medical education at Bozeman, and then transfer to Colorado State.

Tietz was appointed the ninth president of Montana State University by unanimous vote of the Board of Regents on August 1, 1977.

=== Montana State University ===
Tietz had an "aggressive, cocky, out-spoken, and dynamic" personal style. His governance of the university was very top-down, and controlled by a small, close-knit team of decision-makers. Tietz fought challenges to his authority vigorously. When the state commissioner of higher education told him to do something, he once replied, "Don't you tell me how to run Montana State University." This decision-making style was eagerly embraced by MSU administrators, faculty, and staff, who saw it as the kind of aggressive leadership lacking under the more soft-spoken, behind-the-scenes leadership of the previous president, Carl W. McIntosh.

Tietz believed that Montana State University (MSU) should be far more research-oriented. He encouraged faculty to engage in research, encouraged them to apply for federal research grant money, and required university administrators to seek out federal research funds to expand, renovate, and build new research buildings on campus. Research funding during his tenure rose to $18 million in 1990 from $7 million in 1977. As part of his emphasis on research, he began fully funding the university's teacher development, research development, and sabbatical leave programs. Under Tietz, faculty received full pay for sabbaticals.

Tietz arrived at MSU just as a severe, seven-year recession in the state was ending. Economic growth led to higher tax revenues, and this allowed the state legislature to revised the university's funding formula for the first time since the 1950s. Now funding would be based on a wide range of factors that included enrollment, faculty size, and school mission, and be adjusted based on a comparison with 15 other similarly situated colleges and universities in the Rocky Mountain region. When Tietz arrived at MSU, faculty salaries had declined 23 percent over the past decade and were in the bottom 10 percent nationally. In 1981, under the new formula, Tietz won a 16 percent university-wide budget increase and faculty received a 15 percent pay hike. The 1981 budget boost was followed by several more years of increases. This allowed for a major revamp of the undergraduate core curriculum for the first time in more than a decade. Under Tietz, MSU also expanded its international studies and university honors programs, started the Writing Center, rapidly expanded financial aid (primarily through scholarships), founded the Shakespeare in the Parks program, and founded an Office of Academic Affairs, an Alumni Association, and the Bobcat Boosters alumni network to support sports. Tietz also greatly expanded Native American programs at MSU (which he believes was one of his most important achievements).

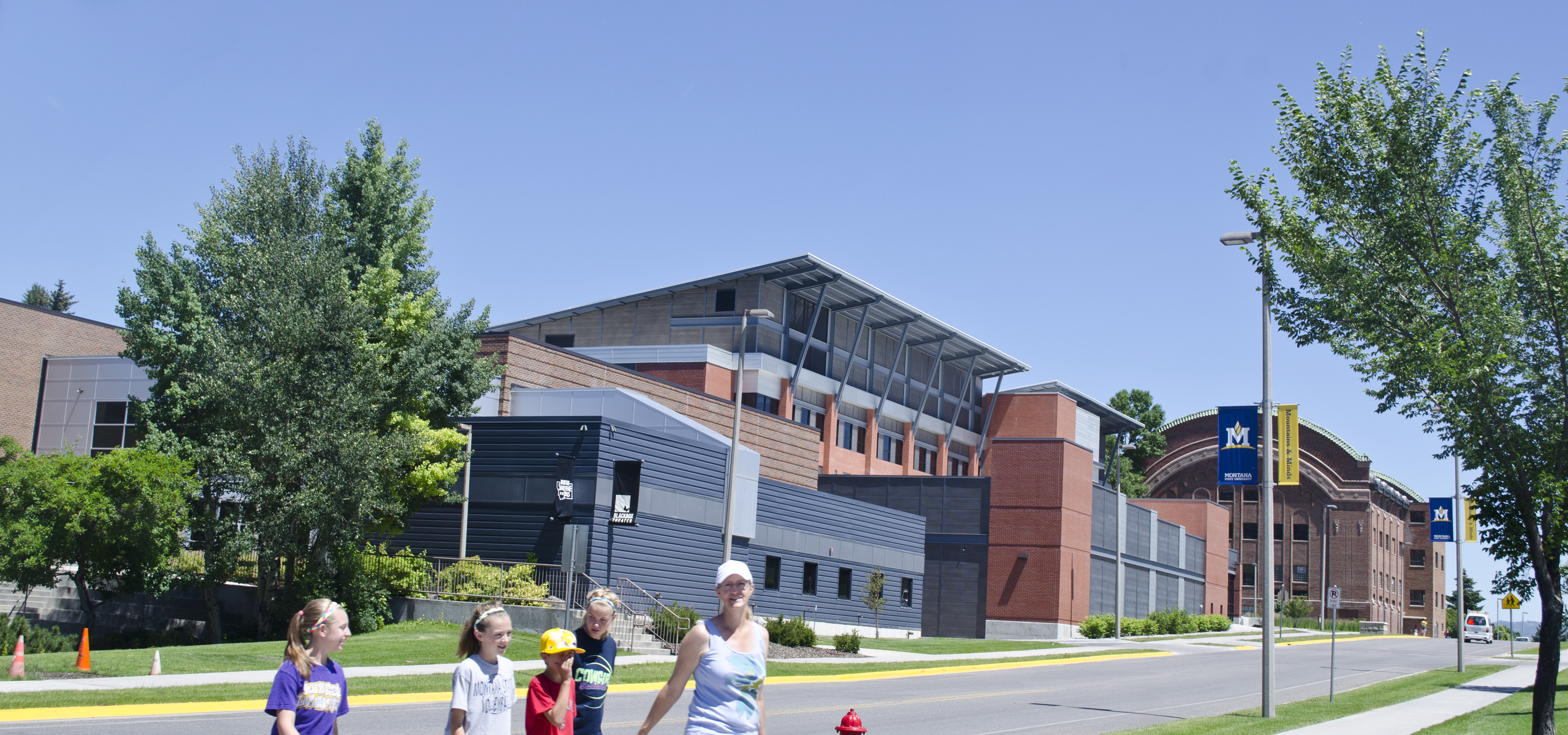
The Visual Communications Building, constructed during Tietz's presidency in 1983.

Few buildings were constructed under Tietz. However, the state legislature did fund the Visual Communications Building (completed in 1983), the Animal Resources Center (completed in 1984), and the Plant Growth Center (completed in 1987). A third building, the modern home of the Museum of the Rockies, opened in 1989, but this structure was paid for by bonds and not state legislative appropriations. By the end of his tenure, however, planning for a new engineering building had begun. (This structure, the Engineering and Physical Science Building, would not be completed until 1999.) Despite the lack of building, enrollment continued to rise. It hit a then-historic high of 11,311 in 1982. (During the same period, the University of Montana lost 2,000 students in enrollment, despite seeing the number of out-of-state students rise to more than 30 percent of its student body.)

During his tenure at Montana State, Teitz also established the Advanced Technology Park. The goal was for MSU to act as a high technology development incubator, and then transfer the discoveries made to the private sector. Not only would MSU benefit from licensing and royalty income, but the state economy would grow and jobs would be created. Tietz won a six-month sabbatical in 1984 that allowed him to travel the nation to learn about these tech incubators. (Stanford University, for example, used its tech incubator to spark the creation of Silicon Valley.) But Governor Ted Schwinden believed MSU should continue to focus strongly on agronomy, animal husbandry, and agricultural economics rather than high technology or research. In 1987, the US West telecommunications company asked seven Western states to submit proposals for the location of its new technology development center (which would bring 1,500 jobs and a critical high technology company to whichever area was chosen). Tietz offered 45 acres (180,000 m^{2}) of Advanced Technology Park land and buildings to the company. But a new recession hit the state the same year, leading to deep cut-backs at MSU. Tietz worked hard to reverse the cuts, and failed. Schwinden, meanwhile, accused Tietz of "duplicity" in telling US West that Montana offered a superb location for the new technology center while telling the legislature that MSU was suffering from the budget cuts. Tietz was outraged, calling it an incredible accusation and later saying he had never been so mad in his entire life. The Advanced Technology Park struggled for the remainder of Tietz's tenure at MSU. (It later succeeded in luring a number of small companies to locate there, and as of 2007 had generated 350 new jobs. That same year, Business Week said MSU ranked in the top 10 universities encouraging and making technology transfer.)

The final three years of Tietz's presidency were marked by budgetary retrenchment. Tietz said he and his administrators spent 18 hours a day for two weeks to try to meet the cuts required by the legislature (which totalled more than 10 percent). Among the programs cut were membership in the Center for Research Libraries; sports like skiing, women's gymnastics, and wrestling; undergraduate degree programs like business education, engineering science, and industrial arts; and the Office of Institutional Research. The five departments of the College of Education were merged into two. The departments of home economics and physical education were merged, as were the departments of agricultural engineering and civil engineering. Two programs slated for closure were international studies and the School of Architecture. But after bitter battles with the public, students, faculty, professional associations, and the legislature, Tietz was forced to keep them both open. Architecture was saved only because students in the program agreed to tax themselves an extra $190 a semester to pay for faculty salaries.

In March 1989, Tietz decided to resign, worn out by the legislative cutbacks and lack of support from the governor. An auditor's report, released in April 1989, showed that researchers had overspent their federal grants by hundreds of thousands of dollars and Tietz had done nothing to rein in costs or stop the spending. (The report might possibly have forced his resignation, but he had already made the decision to retire.)

== Other roles ==
While serving as dean of the veterinary college at CSU, Tietz was a member of the Council of Deans of the Association of American Veterinary Medical Colleges (AAVMC), and served as AAVMC president for a year.

While serving as president of MSU, Tietz also held a number of other positions. He was a member of the board of directors of the Montana Energy Research and Development Institute from 1977 to 1985, and served as its chair for two years. He served on the Council of Presidents of the National Association of State Universities and Land-Grant Colleges (now known as the Association of Public and Land-grant Universities) from 1977 to 1990, on the board of directors of the Greater Montana Foundation from 1977 to 2004, and on the board of trustees of the Yellowstone Association from 1981 to 1993 (serving as chair from 1987 to 1992).

Even though retired, William Tietz remained active in his local community. As of 2007, he served as chair of the Board of Directors of MSU's Burton K. Wheeler Center, and was a member of Gallatin County Detention Center Planning Committee. From 1958 to 2006, he also served on the Conference of Research Workers in Animal Disease. Tietz was made a life member of the group in 2003.

== Personal life ==
Tietz was married twice. He and his first wife, Patricia Lane Wells Tietz, were married in 1953 and divorced in 1983. They had three children: Karyn, William John Tietz III (known as John), and Julia. A fourth child, Katherine Johanna Tietz, died in infancy.

He dated Montana politician Dorothy Bradley for a time until her run for governor in 1992. The two remained friends after their romantic relationship ended.

His second wife, the former Gwen Massey, was 25 years younger than Tietz. They lived in Bozeman, Montana, and raised horses.

For many years after his retirement, William Tietz got together every few weeks with his MSU VP Stu Knapp, and Carl McIntosh, to discuss current events, Montana State University, the state of Montana, Bozeman, and other topics. The meetings continued until McIntosh and Knapp's deaths. Tietz died on June 10, 2020.

== Legacy ==
In 2011, three historians who wrote a history of MSU were asked to name Montana State University's most important presidents. Pierce Mullen, Robert Rydell, and Jeffrey Safford named Tietz one of the four top presidents in the university's history. The others were James M. Hamilton, Roland Renne, and Leon H. Johnson. (Safford said Tietz was even more important than Renne.) Tietz "set MSU on the path it still follows today", and the group agreed that presidents Michael P. Malone, Geoffrey Gamble, and Waded Cruzado have only built on what Tietz accomplished.

William Tietz has won numerous honors throughout his life. Among the more important are the Distinguished Service Award bestowed by the Colorado Veterinary Medical Association in 1976, and the Distinguished Alumni Award bestowed by the Colorado State University School of Veterinary and Biomedical Sciences in 1977.

Upon his retirement in 1990, Tietz endowed MSU with funds to create the President's Native American Excellence Scholarships for American Indian Students. This scholarship goes to a Native American student who has been accepted into the Master of Arts program in Native American Studies.

On November 2, 2007, MSU renamed its Animal Resources Center the William J. Tietz Hall in honor of Tietz.

== Bibliography ==
- Hansen, James E. Democracy's University: A History of Colorado State University, 1970-2003. Ft. Collins, Colo.: Colorado State University, 2007.
- Rydell, Robert; Safford, Jeffrey; and Mullen, Pierce. In the People's Interest: A Centennial History of Montana State University. Bozeman, Mont.: Montana State University Foundation, 1993.
- Student Chapter of the AVMA. Anamnesis 1964. West Lafayette, Ind: Purdue University School of Veterinary Science and Medicine, 1964
