= James M. Hamilton =

American historian and economist

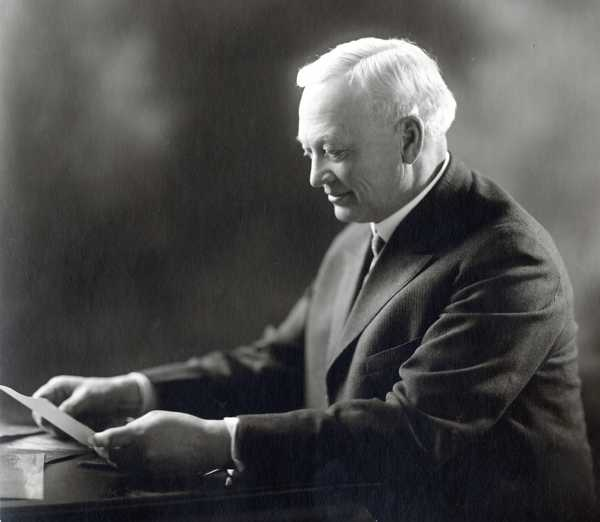
- James M. Hamilton, 1915

3rd President of Montana State University
- In office 1904–1919
- Preceded by: James R. Reid
- Succeeded by: Alfred Atkinson

Personal details
- Born: October 1, 1861 Crawford County, Illinois, United States
- Died: September 23, 1940 (aged 78) Bozeman, Montana, United States
- Spouses: Emma Shideler Hamilton (died 1909); Florence Ballinger Hamilton
- Education: Union Christian College
- Profession: Professor of History and Economics
- Website: www.montana.edu

James McClellan Hamilton (October 1, 1861 – September 23, 1940) was an American historian and economist who was the third president of Montana State University. He served from 1904 to 1919. A group of historians named Hamilton one of Montana State's four most important presidents in 2011.

== Early life and career ==
James M. Hamilton was born on a farm on October 1, 1861, in Crawford County, Illinois, to James and Mary (Burner) Hamilton. He was the ninth of 10 children. His Presbyterian paternal grandparents emigrated to the United States from Belfast, Ireland, shortly after the American Revolutionary War. His Lutheran maternal grandparents came from what is now Germany at about the same time. Although his paternal grandparents settled in Beaver Falls, Pennsylvania and his maternal grandparents in northern Virginia, they both settled in Licking County, Ohio, in the 1820s. James' parents met there, and married in 1838.

About 1850, a large migration of Licking County residents began into the Wabash Valley of Illinois, and his parents were among them. James grew up near Licking Township and attended local public school. His father died when he was 14 years old, and James began working during the spring, summer, and fall in order to support his family. He attended school only in the winter, which prevented him from graduating from school until he was 18 years old. (Most children graduated from high school at about age 16 at the time.)

After graduation, James worked as a public school teacher in rural Illinois public schools from 1879 to 1882.

Hamilton enrolled at Union Christian College in Merom, Indiana. The date of his entry is not clear. He worked at a number of jobs to pay for his education, and he graduated with a bachelor's degree in 1887. He then entered the graduate program at Union Christian, receiving either a Master of Arts or a Master of Science degree in 1890. While in the graduate program, he married Emma Shideler of Merom on June 6, 1888.

=== Role in Montana's educational system ===
Hamilton obtained a position as superintendent of the public school system in Sumner, Illinois, in 1887. He worked there until 1889, when he moved to take a similar position in Missoula, Montana. Montana became a state on November 8, 1889. In 1893, the state legislature began considering legislation to establish a state college system. The Montana State Teacher's Association (now MEA-MFT) advocated that a single college be created rather than several. Hamilton was elected president of the teachers' association in December 1892. Hamilton traveled to the new state capital, Helena, to lobby for a single college. But listening to the debates there convinced him that multiple campuses would be more likely to win legislative approval in Montana's bitter political climate (in which towns and cities lobbied hard to undercut one another in an attempt to reap state largesse).

The legislature subsequently passed legislation establishing two colleges. It also established a State Board of Education in 1893, and Hamilton was appointed a member. While serving on the board, Hamilton chose the sites (Missoula and Bozeman) for the two state colleges, their first presidents, and their first faculty members.

After eight years of service, Hamilton resigned from the State Board of education and took an appointment as a professor of history and economics at Montana State University (Missoula) (now known as the University of Montana). He was promoted to vice-president of the school a short time later. In 1901, the same year that he began teaching at the University of Montana, he began a five-year term as a member of the Montana State Textbook Commission, which chose textbooks for public schools in the state.

== Montana State University ==
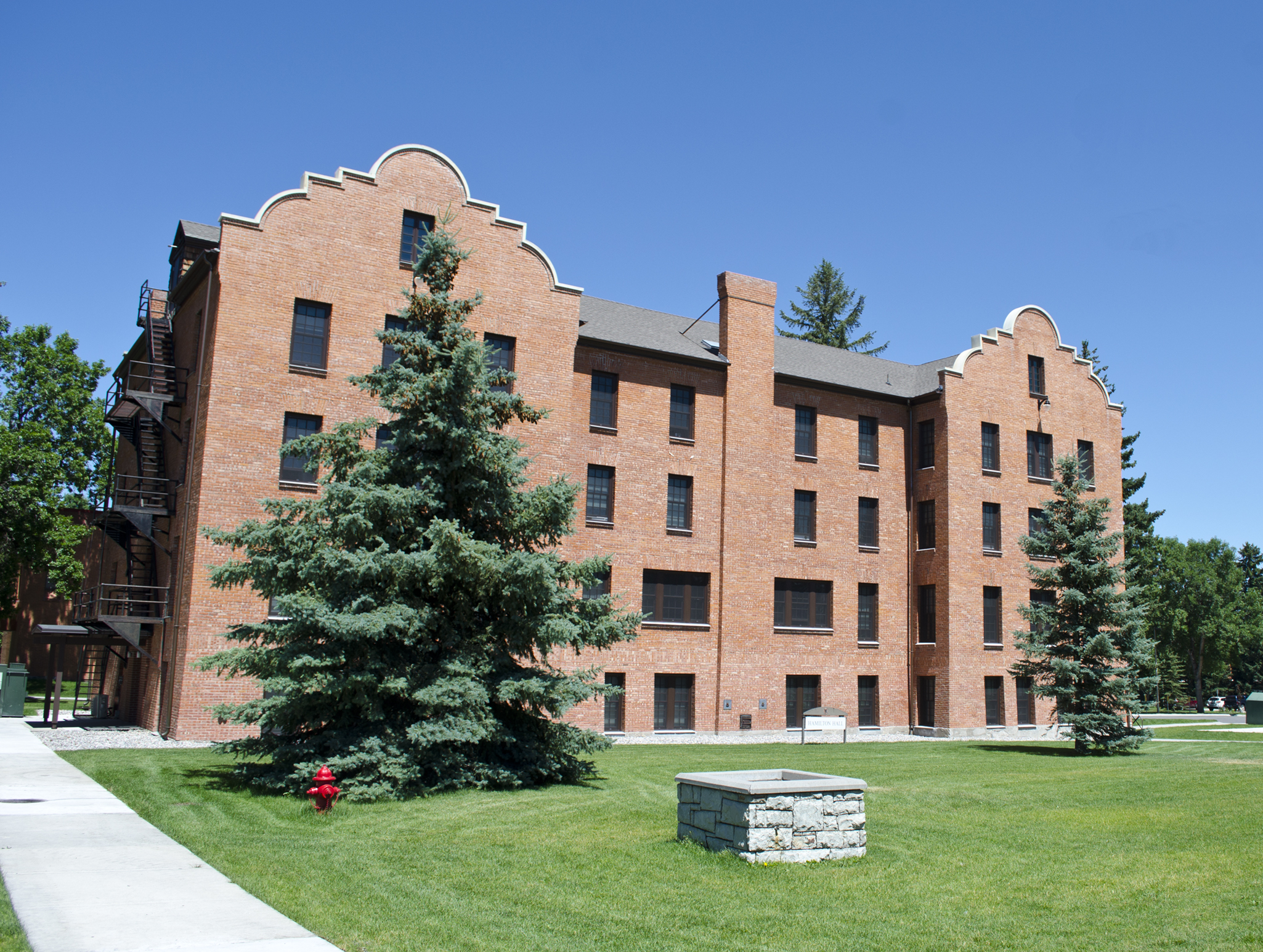
Hamilton Hall on the MSU Campus, named for Emma Hamilton, wife of MSU President James Hamilton

The Montana State Board of Education appointed Hamilton to be President of what was then known as the Agricultural College of the State of Montana (now Montana State University). The first president, Augustus M. Ryon, had only served for a year before coming into significant conflict with faculty and local businesspeople who disagreed with his intent to build a technology-oriented engineering school. His successor, the Rev. Dr. James R. Reid, was a Presbyterian minister and educator who rapidly expanded enrollment, obtained a campus, and oversaw the construction of the college's first two buildings—the Agricultural Experiment Station (now known as Taylor Hall) and the Main Building (now known as Montana Hall). Reid was determined, however, to stop students from dancing, drinking, gambling, playing cards, and soliciting prostitutes (common distractions in a frontier town like Bozeman), and his constant anti-vice campaign took a significant toll on his health. He resigned in 1904.

Hamilton's governance style was unlike the authoritarian Reid. He was friendly and outgoing, which made him popular among state legislators, local Bozemanites, and students, but he was also a decisive leader who rarely deviated from a course of action (once decided upon). He was also interested in ensuring that Montana State adopted the most modern educational models available, and he traveled widely in Europe in 1912 in order to keep abreast of ongoing changes in European institutions of higher education.

Determined to make the college into a school of technology, Hamilton rapidly expanded the curriculum in areas such as biology, chemistry, engineering, geology, and physics. He also devised the school motto, "Education for Efficiency", which the college continued to use until the 1990s. Further marking this change in direction, the school was officially renamed the Montana College of Agriculture and Mechanic Arts in 1913 (although that name was in widespread use as early as 1894). The college's first great rapid expansion of physical plant also began under Hamilton. Constructed during this time were Linfield Hall (1908), Hamilton Hall (1910), and Traphagen Hall (1919). Hamilton Hall was named for Mrs. Emma Hamilton, the popular and vivacious president's wife who died on August 12, 1909. The giant whitewashed "M" on the side of the Mount Baldy in the foothills of the Bridger Range was first built in 1916, and in 1917 ROTC came to campus for the first time.

Hamilton married Florence Ballinger, an instructor in the Department of Home Economics, on August 21, 1918.

When World War I ended in 1919, Hamilton resigned as president of the college. He argued that a younger man (he was 58 years old by now) should take over. Hamilton accepted the position of Dean of Men in addition to resuming his teaching duties in the Department of Economics.

=== Retirement ===
While continuing to teach, Hamilton also continued to attend school. He enrolled in classes at Cornell University, Harvard University, the University of California, and the University of Chicago. He wrote a "Montana Supplement" in 1921 for the civics textbook used in Montana high schools.

Hamilton continued to take on a number of professional roles as well. He was elected President of the Montana State Teacher's Association in 1922 and 1923, and as of the 1970s remained the only person to hold the office three times. He was also elected president of the Inland Empire Teachers Association in 1923, and remains the only person to hold both the Montana and Inland Empire presidencies concurrently.

=== Death ===
Hamilton cut back his teaching load in 1935 to write. He completed two manuscripts during this time. One was History of Yellowstone National Park (Previous to 1895), and the other was From Wilderness to Statehood: A History of Montana, 1805-1900. Neither was published in his lifetime. In 1957, Florence Hamilton asked Dr. Merrill G. Burlingame, a professor of history at Montana State College, to edit the latter manuscript into a book. This book was published in 1957, and a revised edition (with a new chapter by Burlingame) issued in 1970.

In the spring of 1940, Hamilton suffered a stroke. Although it was not considered serious, his health failed rapidly during the summer. He died at his home in Bozeman on September 23, 1940. His funeral was held in what is now Romney Gym, attended by all the faculty and students of Montana State College as well as many members of the public.

== Legacy, other roles, and honors ==
Hamilton was a member of the Unitarian Church. He was an active Freemason, becoming a Master Mason in Bozeman Lodge No. 18. He was also a member of St. John's Commandery of the Knights Templar, the Algeria Temple of the Ancient Arabic Order of the Nobles of the Mystic Shrine, and the Benevolent and Protective Order of Elks. He was a founding member of the Bozeman Rotary Club.

Hamilton also maintained memberships in Phi Kappa Phi and Sigma Chi.

Three times, Montana State honored him. The first was on October 18, 1929, which was proclaimed "Dean Hamilton Day" in honor of his 25th year of service to the college. That same day, he was elected the first president of the newly formed "Quarter Century Club" (an association of college faculty and staff with twenty-five years or more of service). In June 1930, Montana State University conferred upon him an honorary Doctor of Laws degree.

In 2011, three historians who wrote a history of MSU were asked to name Montana State University's most important presidents. Pierce Mullen, Robert Rydell, and Jeffrey Safford named Hamilton one of the four top presidents in the university's history. The others were Roland Renne, Leon H. Johnson, and William Tietz. Hamilton, the scholars said, turned Montana State from an ill-defined, small school into a large agricultural college with a strong but narrow focus. His stamp on the university would remain well into the 1950s. Montana State University Archives and Special Collections holds two collections related to Hamilton: Collection 0172 and Collection 0918.

== Bibliography ==
- Burlingame, Merrill G., ed. "Introduction." In From Wilderness to Statehood. By James M. Hamilton. Portland, Ore.: Binfords & Mort, 1957.
- Cattell, James McKeen. School and Society. New York: Society for the Advancement of Education, 1923.
- National Education Association. Yearbook and List of Active Members. Winona, Minn.: National Education Association, 1910.
