= Leon H. Johnson =

American chemist and university president

7th President of Montana State University
- In office February 14, 1964 – June 18, 1969
- Preceded by: Roland Renne
- Succeeded by: Carl W. McIntosh

Personal details
- Born: March 6, 1908 Hawley, Minnesota, United States
- Died: June 18, 1969 (aged 61) Bozeman, Montana, United States
- Spouse: Esther Pauline Evenson Johnson
- Children: Vance (daughter) and Linda (daughter)
- Education: Concordia College; University of Minnesota
- Profession: Professor of Chemistry
- Website: www.montana.edu

Leon H. Johnson (March 6, 1908 – June 18, 1969) was an American chemist and mathematician who served as President of Montana State University from 1964 to 1969. A group of historians named him one of Montana State's four most important presidents in 2011.

== Early life and education ==
Leon Johnson was born March 6, 1908, in Hawley, Minnesota, to Hans L. and Petra (Solum) J. Johnson. He had four siblings: Brothers Harvey, Burtrum and Hans, and sister Orpha. His parents were both of Norwegian descent, and he grew up speaking perfect Norwegian.

He enrolled at Concordia College in Moorhead, Minnesota, and graduated with a bachelor's degree in chemistry and mathematics in 1932.

== Career ==
After graduating, he taught chemistry, music, and physics at high schools in Killdeer and Mandan, North Dakota. He also filled administrative roles in these schools. He left teaching high school in 1939, and took a position as an instructor in agricultural biochemistry at the University of Minnesota. He enrolled the same year in the university's doctoral program, and graduated in 1943 with a Ph.D. in biochemistry. From 1940 to 1943, he was a Frasch Foundation Research Fellow.

Johnson won an appointment as an assistant professor of chemistry and a research biochemist at what was then known as Montana State College (MSC) on September 1, 1943. He was promoted to full professor in 1948. In 1947, MSC President Roland Renne appointed him director of the MSC Endowment and Research Foundation. This nonprofit organization, newly established by Renne, was incorporated to allow the college to accept federal and private research grants. He continued in this position until 1967, partway into his presidency.

In 1955, Johnson was appointed Dean of the Graduate Division.

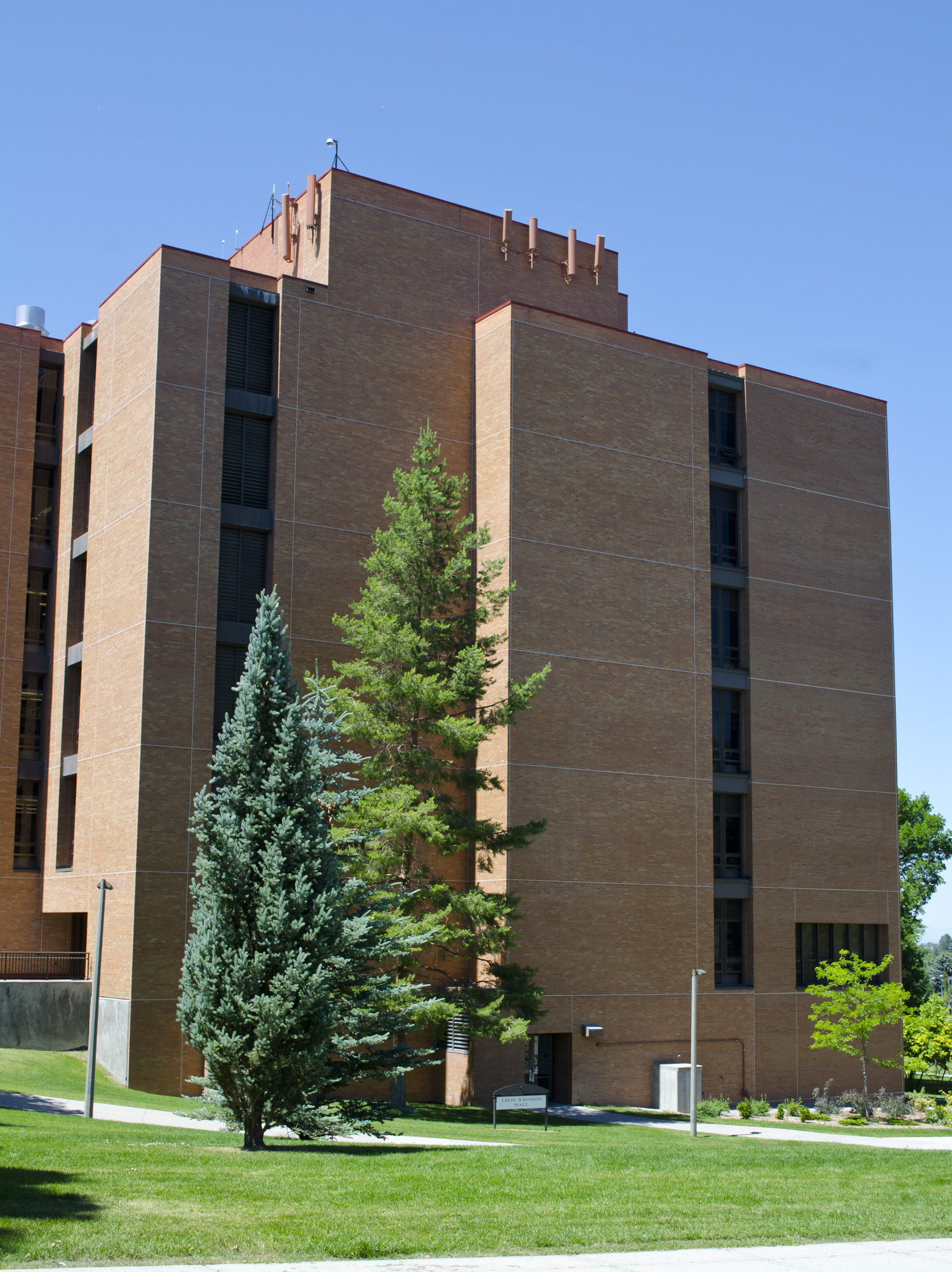
Leon Johnson Hall at Montana State University.

In 1963, Johnson was appointed Acting President of the college. MSC President Roland Renne had taken leaves of absence in order to take various positions with the U.S. federal government. Dr. Paschal Clay Gaines, a professor of chemistry, was named Acting President during Renne's absences. But Gaines fell ill in 1963, and the MSC Board of Regents asked Renne to return to duty. Renne demurred, noting that he'd been granted leave through early 1964 and to abandon his government position would show a lack of good faith. Montana Attorney General Forrest H. Anderson agreed that Renne had the right to the full amount of his leave of absence. The Board of Regents appointed Johnson the Acting President of MSC.

On February 10, 1964, Johnson was appointed president of MSC. His appointment was effective either February 14 or February 16 (sources differ), and his salary set at $22,000 a year.

Deeply committed to the college's research function, he pushed for MSC to be named a university—a change Renne had advocated since the early 1950s, and which the Montana state legislature approved on July 1, 1965. At that time, the school received its new name, Montana State University (MSU). Bachelor's degree programs in economics, English, history, music, political science, and other disciplines were quickly established, as was the first university honors program. Johnson was a devoted admirer of the arts, and MSU's art and music programs blossomed. Johnson quickly worked to end the acrimonious relationship with the University of Montana, and the two schools began to present a united front to the state legislature.

Johnson was a strong conservative—fiscally, socially, and politically. He was committed to continuing Renne's educational plan, but declined to spend money on new buildings (preferring to consolidate and renovate rather than expand). He also continued Renne's policies largely barring from campus speakers who were not clearly in the political mainstream. Johnson's policies were largely supported by the student body and the taxpaying public. MSU practiced a policy known as in loco parentis, in which it acted as a "parent" toward the "children" attending school there. Students themselves accepted these restrictions, which included dress codes, older adult chaperones at dances, a ban on alcohol, and mandatory military training for freshmen and sophomores. Although many American college campuses were engulfed by student radicalism, MSU's student body was as conservative as Johnson was, however, and for many years the biggest issues on campus were ending Saturday morning classes, building student parking lots, and saving an old barn on campus.

There were some campus protests, however. The first protest against the Vietnam War occurred in 1966 (drawing about 100 students), two underground student newspapers briefly appeared, and some students organized clubs to debate issues of the day. There were minor faculty and student protests when Johnson attempted to prevent English professor James Myers from assigning students to read James Baldwin's novel Another Country, and in the summer of 1968 a few faculty organized a symposium on the war. When about 150 students rallied in front of Montana Hall in 1969 to ask for co-ed and "open visitation" dorms (e.g., to allow men into women's dorm rooms, and vice versa), Johnson threatened to call out the city police.

MSU's Bobcat Stadium saw its genesis during the Johnson years. Growing student unrest over the football team's use of decrepit Gatton Field (while the basketball team used modern Brick Breeden Fieldhouse) led to a proposal by Johnson in April 1968 to build a 16,000-seat stadium funded by student fees. The proposal failed in December 1968 after students argued that the university should concurrently build a new fitness center as well. (The stadium funding issue would pass in December 1969 after the university made repeated assurances it would build a fitness center first.)

== Personal life ==
Leon Johnson married Esther Pauline Evenson on June 6, 1936. They had two daughters, Linda and Vance.

On October 22, 1968, Johnson had a severe heart attack, shortly after delivering his "State of the University" address to the student body. On about May 7, 1969, he underwent coronary bypass surgery in Minneapolis, Minnesota, to repair a blocked artery in his heart. During this period, William Johnstone, a professor of education and Vice President for Administration at MSU, handled most of the governance matters concerning the university. Johnstone acted as an "interim president" in all but name, although he frequently referred matters to Johnson for his input.

Johnson returned to Bozeman on May 22, and attended the university commencement on June 8. On June 18, he saw his physician at about 10:00 A.M. He returned home, and ate lunch at about 1:00 P.M. He had another heart attack at 1:30 P.M., and died immediately in the presence of his wife and a neighbor.

After his death, William Johnstone was named Acting President.

== Legacy, honors, and memberships ==
Johnson's alma mater, Concordia College, bestowed a Doctor of Humane Letters on Johnson in 1966.

In 1971, Montana State University named its new $3.75 million Life Science Building "Leon Johnson Hall" in his honor. The eight-story structure was completed in 1976.

Johnson was a member of the American Association for the Advancement of Science, American Chemical Society, Sigma Xi, and Phi Kappa Phi. He was also a member of the Benevolent and Protective Order of Elks and the Rotary Club. He was president of the Bozeman Rotary in 1950.

In 2011, three historians who wrote a history of MSU were asked to name Montana State University's most important presidents. Pierce Mullen, Robert Rydell, and Jeffrey Safford named Johnson one of the four top presidents in the university's history. The others were James M. Hamilton, Roland Renne, and William Tietz. The three cited Johnson for his excellent relationships with state legislators, and for turning the school from a college to a university. Although Renne was the main force behind winning university designation (which occurred under Johnson), Johnson established bachelor's degree programs in economics, English, history, music, philosophy, political science, psychology, and sociology; started the MSU undergraduate honors program; expanded MSU's doctoral programs; and won federal research grants totalling $2 million. "Leon Johnson, he basically made us the university," Mullen said.

== Bibliography ==
- Rydell, Robert; Safford, Jeffrey; and Mullen, Pierce. In the People's Interest: A Centennial History of Montana State University. Bozeman, Mont.: Montana State University Foundation, 1993.
- Who Was Who in American History, Science and Technology. Chicago: Marquis Who's Who, 1976.
