= Michael P. Malone =

American historian (1940–1999)

10th President of Montana State University
- In office January 1, 1991 (acting); March 1991 (permanent) – December 21, 1999
- Preceded by: William Tietz
- Succeeded by: Geoffrey Gamble

Personal details
- Born: April 18, 1940 Pomeroy, Washington, U.S.
- Died: December 21, 1999 (aged 59) Bozeman, Montana, U.S.
- Spouse: Kathleen Campbell Malone
- Children: Molly, Thomas; Clint, Molly, Wendy (stepchildren)
- Education: Gonzaga University; Washington State University
- Profession: Professor of History
- Website: www.montana.edu

Michael Peter Malone (April 18, 1940 – December 21, 1999) was an American historian who served from 1991 to 1999 as the 10th president of Montana State University. One of Montana's preeminent historians and writers, he was named by both The Missoulian and the Great Falls Tribune newspapers as one of the 100 most influential Montanans of the 20th century. His Montana: A History of Two Centuries (co-written with Richard B. Roeder) was called the "definitive history of the state" by the Bozeman Daily Chronicle.

== Early life ==
Malone was born on April 18, 1940, in Pomeroy, Washington, to John and Delores (Cheyne) Malone. His father was the son of a farmer who (with his brothers) owned several farms in Garfield, Walla Walla, and Whitman counties. The Malones were of Irish descent, and Michael was deeply proud of his heritage. His mother, Delores, was born in Zillah, Washington, and his parents married on November 14, 1936. Malone's father managed McKeirnan Hardware and Implement in Pomeroy, and attended Holy Rosary Catholic Church.

Michael was the Malone's only child. However, in 1954, the Malones' close friends, Jack and Kathryn Bowman, died in an automobile accident. The Malones then raised the Bowmans' four children, Ray, Wynn, Kevin, and Jennie. Michael Malone considered them his half-siblings. As a teenager, he worked harvesting peas for the Green Giant vegetable company. Michael "had an especially close relationship with his father", and he had a significant influence on Michael. Michael Malone later said his father was the "finest man he ever knew". John Malone suffered from severe cardiac problems in the 1960s, which worried Michael a great deal. John Malone died in 1972, and Michael believed that he lost a great deal from losing his father at an early age.

Malone's mother married Ronald L. Chard of Pomeroy in 1974. She died at the age of 84 in May 1998, just 18 months before her son.

Malone enrolled at Gonzaga University in Spokane, Washington. His initially had a pre-law major, but changed his major to history during his sophomore year. "I just liked the subject," he said. "I thought it would be fun to make a career of doing for others what (historians) were doing for me." He graduated magna cum laude with a bachelor's degree. He then enrolled in the doctorate program in American studies at Washington State University in Pullman, Washington, graduating with a Ph.D. in 1966.

=== Academic career ===
Malone sought and won a teaching position at Texas A&M University for the 1966–1967 school year.

He left Texas A&M and took a position as an assistant history professor at Montana State University in the fall of 1967. He was promoted to associate professor in 1970 and professor in 1973. He was named head of the Department of History and Philosophy in 1976. Three years later, he was appointed dean of graduate studies for the entire university. He was appointed director of the Burton K. Wheeler Center at MSU in 1987, and served in that position until 1990. He resigned as dean of graduate studies in 1988 after being named interim vice president for academic affairs. He was reappointed interim vice president twice more, in 1989 and 1990.

During his academic career at MSU, Malone wrote seven books. His 1989 book, The American West (co-authored with Richard W. Etulain) was nominated for a Pulitzer Prize. By 1990, he was working on a biography of James J. Hill, the late 19th and early 20th century railroad executive whose Great Northern Railway played a critical role in the economic expansion of Montana.

He also traveled widely across Montana, lecturing in many of the state's small towns on Montana history. In 1972 and 1973, he and fellow MSU professor of history Richard Roeder traveled across the state to educate citizens about the newly created Montana Committee for the Humanities (now known as Humanities Montana), which greatly enhanced public participation in the agency's programs. He also lectured extensively throughout the West on a variety of topics in the history of the American West.

As dean of graduate studies, Malone was critical of what he perceived as the state's lack of foresight regarding higher education. He told the Los Angeles Times that the state legislature was unwilling to invest in academic disciplines that would help build the technology sector, and generally failed to invest in higher education as a whole. He also criticized the state for failing to teach business skills and entrepreneurship. "We're victims of the old mind-set, that any corporation heading for Montana must be bent on rape. Montana is the last of the Old West and we're in crisis and we're not doing the most obvious things that have to be done," he said. "We're trying to preserve a unique life style and trying to put our feet into the future at the same time. So far we really haven't come to terms with the conflict this creates."

In 1987, Malone pressed the United States Congress to make "tuition-remission" scholarships tax-exempt, so that more students would be encouraged to seek graduate education.

== Montana State University presidency ==
=== Appointment ===
Montana State University president William Tietz announced his retirement at the end of 1990.

Malone was unanimously named MSU's acting president on January 1, 1991, at a salary of $86,000 per year. After a nationwide search, the board of regents of the Montana University System narrowed the list of finalists to three: Malone; Dr. Harold Allen, vice president for graduate studies, research and economic development at the University of Toledo; and Dr. Rex Cottle, dean of the School of Business at the University of Mississippi (and later president of Lamar University in Texas). In March 1991, Malone was named MSU's 10th president.

=== Presidential achievements ===
Malone was the first MSU president to preside over the Billings, Great Falls, and Havre campuses. He subsequently appointed the first chancellors of the three major campuses in 1995: Ron Sexton at Montana State University Billings, Will Weaver at Great Falls College Montana State University, and William Daehling at Montana State University–Northern. He also appointed the second chancellor at MSU-Northern, Michael Rao.

Malone's governance style was democratic and personal. Faculty, employee, and student leaders agreed that he sought input and consensus on decisions. Malone was personable and friendly to faculty, workers, and students alike. His willingness to talk one-on-one with clerical staff was "unusual", according to university registrar Chuck Nelson.

Malone's friendly style extended to his relationship with the state legislature as well. Tom Stump, MSU's vice president for finances, said Malone was personally quite popular with legislators and their staff. MSU's chief lobbyist, Cathy Conover, also noted that Malone sought to provide the legislature with the right information and an honest assessment, which earned him a great deal of personal respect.

During Malone's presidency, Montana State University witnessed "one of the greatest expansions in campus history", as a large number of new buildings were constructed. These included the $1 million Centennial Mall (1993), the $22 million Engineering and Physical Sciences Building (1997), the $10 million Bobcat Stadium renovation, the $13.5 million renovation of Brick Breeden Fieldhouse, the $12 million Agricultural Biosciences Building (1999), and the $7.5 million Renne Library renovation (1999).

The refurbishment of the two athletics buildings was especially important. Bruce Parker, MSU's associated athletics director, said funding for these projects was directly attributable to the president: "None of the athletics renovations would have happened without Mike Malone". The stadium renovation included new public-area seating, three tiers of skyboxes, and a camera deck to permit televising of games. Inside the stadium were a new second-floor banquet room, third-floor bar and concessions area, and handicapped-accessible seating, doors, restrooms, and other areas throughout the structure. Every skybox contained indoor seating for 12, outdoor seating for 12 (with overhead radiant heating elements), and blue-and-gold floor tiled wet bars, and cost $7,000 to construct. Two-thirds of the skyboxes had been rented by the time the renovations were complete.

In 1999, Malone fired Bobcats football head coach Cliff Hysell after eight losing seasons. Malone hired Mike Kramer, the winning coach at Eastern Washington University.

Research and enrollment were other areas where Malone achieved success. He pushed hard for faculty and the university to seek and win federal funding for scientific research. The success here was significant: Federal research funding grew from just $13 million in the late 1980s to more than $50 million in 1999. The undergraduate curriculum was revamped, and he pushed a program to "guarantee" that each student could graduate within four years. Under Malone's leadership, enrollment at Montana State University hit a historic high of 11,746 students in 1999. Consistent with his earlier focus on technology development and education, he also established the Burns Telecommunications Center.

Financial pressures were heavy during Malone's tenure. He reenergized and expanded alumni fund-raising programs and worked to have alumni become more active in campus life, and pushed the MSU Foundation to redouble its fund-raising efforts. But the state legislature kept funding for salaries stagnant. At the start of his presidency, faculty salaries were 25 percent lower than those at comparable universities. Clerical and administrative support staff represented by MEA-MFT struck for higher pay in 1992, and Malone lobbied the state legislature for higher clerical/administrative pay in 1998.

=== Scandals ===
Two minor scandals hit Montana State University during Malone's tenure: The College National Finals Rodeo declined to return to MSU, and two women's basketball coaches were fired for violating NCAA rules. Malone's consensus-building governance style was apparent in both cases, according to vice president for student affairs Allen Yarnell.

College National Finals Rodeo
From 1971 to 1996, the College National Finals Rodeo was held every year at the MSU campus in Bozeman. For years, the U.S. Smokeless Tobacco Company had distributed free samples of Skoal and Copenhagen dipping tobacco to students at the event. The event moved away from MSU in 1997 after 1996 attendance fell 3,000 short of the 25,000-attendee goal. During that year, Malone held meetings during which it was decided that, should the rodeo finals return, smokeless tobacco products could no longer be distributed on campus. The consensus was that this was not a controversial issue. But in late August 1998, the National Intercollegiate Rodeo Association (NIRA) voted unanimously to not return to Bozeman due to the no-tobacco-handouts rule. MSU rodeo coach John Larick public voiced his opposition to Malone's decision, which he called "disgusting". The Bozeman Area Chamber of Commerce also expressed its unhappiness, as the event brought about $1.2 million a year to the local economy.

MSU and Bozeman business leaders attempted to compromise with the NIRA by offering to permit distribution of coupons for free or discounted tobacco products. Malone expressed his willingness to compromise, so long as tobacco was not distributed free. Despite local business opposition to the university's decision, Malone said he had received 20 positive and 13 negative comments from the public, and would stand firm. But on October 2, 1998, NIRA reaffirmed its decision not to return to Bozeman. The association said U.S. Smokeless Tobacco donated $200,000 in rodeo scholarships each year, and it would not alienate this sponsor. MSU vice president Glenn Lewis expressed his view that NIRA never seriously considered the coupon alternative.

Women's basketball
On October 31, 1999, Malone fired MSU women's basketball head coach Tracey Sheehan and assistant coach Jeff Malby. Complaints by student-athletes, athletics department personnel, students' doctors, and team trainers led to an NCAA investigation into charges that the two coaches were overworking their team. The NCAA found that athletes were required to engage in pre-season practice longer than the eight hours per week allowed by the NCAA. (In some cases, athletes were required to practice 16 hours a week or more.) Coaches demanded that athletes return to practice before injuries were fully healed, an excessive number of "overuse injuries" were occurring, and coaches disregarded the welfare of the athletes in their care. (NCAA rules forbid excessive practice that results in stress injuries or overuse injuries, and require coaches to follow doctors' advice when seeking to return an athlete to active status.) As many as 15 athletes on the Lady Bobcats team had overuse injuries such as stress fractures and tendonitis. The NCAA also found that the two coaches regularly exceeded the number of allowable hours for "athletically related activities" and failed to provide the mandatory "positive relationship between student athletes and coach...by engaging in activities which are [...] conducive to the welfare of student athletes".

The NCAA permitted Montana State to impose its own sanctions on the women's basketball program.

=== Criticisms ===
Although widely considered a successful president and very well-liked, Malone received criticism in several areas.

In 2009, MSU chief legislative lobbyist Cathy Conover said that relations with the state legislature had been somewhat poor under Malone (although she did not name him explicitly). She expressed her opinion that MSU officials talked too much about how little money they had, and criticized the legislature too much for not investing in higher education. She believed that Malone's successor, Geoffrey Gamble, had a far more positive style that was "a sea change" and which led the Republican-dominated state legislature to rave about him.

Gamble himself implicitly criticized some of Malone's financial decisions. The football stadium renovations, he noted, had gone ahead even though MSU did not have the money in-hand to pay for them. That, he noted, was a common budgetary tactic at MSU. One of the first financial rules Gamble laid down when his presidency began was to pledge that the university would not initiate projects without having the money to complete them.

Others also questions Malone's financial priorities. Tuition doubled during his time in office, angering students. Some faculty criticized his willingness to construct new buildings while declining to pay for teaching equipment (copiers and projectors) and maintenance (such as fixing broken or defective thermostats). According to the Bozeman Daily Chronicle, Malone tried to respond to these criticisms by rescinding some budget cuts, and by creating a new faculty/student/worker budget committee to make recommendations about spending priorities.

=== Death ===
Malone was diagnosed with cardiomyopathy in 1995. According to physicians, his heart was damaged by an undetected viral infection some years earlier, and was greatly enlarged and weakened.

Michael P. Malone died at 1:15 a.m. at Bozeman Yellowstone International Airport. He had traveled to Washington State University, where officials were trying to recruit him for the open university presidency there. Malone, however, had expressed his desire to remain at MSU. He exited the airport parking lot in his own vehicle, and suffered sudden cardiac death after driving just a few yards. His vehicle struck a street light and came to a stop. Other passengers on the flight stopped and rendered first aid. The Belgrade Fire Department, Montana Highway Patrol, and a local ambulance crew all responded to the scene. Cardiopulmonary resuscitation (CPR) was administered, and paramedics attempted to defibrillate him with electric shocks. These efforts failed, and he was pronounced dead of a heart attack at 1:15 A.M.

His funeral was a private Catholic funeral Mass, and he was buried in the Catholic section of Sunset Hills Cemetery.

== Other roles ==
Malone was active in history, professional, and other organizations throughout his life.

He was a member of the board of directors of the National Association of State Universities and Land-grant Colleges (now known as the Association of Public and Land-grant Universities), and was chair of its International Commission. He was also a board member of the Commission on Colleges of the Northwest Commission on Colleges and Universities and the Western Association of Graduate Schools.

In addition to his many roles at Montana State University, he also served on the board of directors of the Montana State University Foundation and the board of trustees of the Museum of the Rockies.

Malone served his profession in a wide range of ways. he was a member of the board of directors of the Montana Historical Society, the executive council of the Western History Association, the Montana Committee for the Humanities, and the Montana Bicentennial Commission. He was also a member of the editorial board of Montana, The Magazine of Western History, Pacific Northwest Quarterly, and the Pacific Historical Review.

== Legacy ==
Michael P. Malone was widely respected as a historian of Montana and the American West. The Great Falls Tribune and The Missoulian, two large Montana newspapers, each named him one of the 100 most influential Montanans of the 20th century. He was regularly interviewed in print and on television on various history subjects, including a lengthy segment for the PBS documentary series, The Irish in America.

His popularity at MSU led to several awards and honors from the college. In 1999, the university established the Michael P. Malone Professor of History endowed chair in his honor. Nearly $50,000 was raised for the endowment in the first week after his death. Dr. Billy G. Smith was named the first Malone Professor of History in 2002. (The title is awarded for three years, and the incumbent may not seek an immediate second term.) In 1988, a bronze cast was made of the "Wankel Rex", a nearly-complete fossil skeleton of a Tyrannosaurus rex held by the Museum of the Rockies. It was the first full-scale bronze skeleton of a dinosaur in the world, and was erected at the entrance of the museum. It was named "Big Mike" in his honor in 2002. In 2010, MSU renamed the Centennial Mall the Michael Malone Centennial Mall to recognize his efforts which led to its construction. In 2011, Malone was named as one of Montana State's most important presidents—following in the footsteps of William Tietz—by MSU historians Jeffrey Safford, Pierce Mullen, and Robert Rydell in an interview with the Bozeman Daily Chronicle. Montana State University Archives and Special Collections holds the Michael P. Malone Papers, which consists of correspondence and research materials.

Other organizations have also honored Malone. In 2000, the National Association of State Universities and Land-grant Colleges established the Michael P. Malone International Leadership Award to recognize individuals who make outstanding contributions in international education. The same year, the Montana Ambassadors organization named its Educator of the Year award for Malone. In 2002, the Western History Association established the Michael P. Malone Award for the best published article, commentary, or essay on state, provincial, or territorial history in North America. Journalist Rick Allen won the first $500 Malone Award in 2002 for his article on the Montana Vigilantes.

== Publications ==
At the time of his death, Malone had written nine books and 20 articles.

Among these were Montana: A History of Two Centuries, co-written with Richard B. Roeder. It was first published in 1976 and a revised edition (co-written with William L. Lang) issued in 1992. One Montana newspaper called it "the standard text on state history". Malone published The Battle for Butte in 1981. Lang, professor of history at Portland State University, called it "[o]ne of Malone's most important books" because it focused less on biography and parochially on Butte and analyzed the broader trends and pressures being exerted by emerging national corporations and economic consolidation. His last work was Montana Century, a richly photographed coffee table book public in October 1999. It sold 13,000 copies in its first three months and by December 1999 was in its third printing. In 1989, Malone and co-author Richard W. Etulain finished The American West. It was nominated for a Pulitzer Prize. When he died, Malone had a contract with Yale University Press to write a new book re-conceptualizing the history of the American West.

Malone had a reputation as an excellent scholar and writer. Retired MSU professor of history Jeffrey Safford noted that Malone tended to synthesize the work of others with his own research, and was much more interested in the exercise of power than mere "who" and "where". Journalist and author Timothy Egan, writing for the New York Times in 1993, argued that Malone avoided both the traditional cowboys-and-Indians view of the American West as well as the historical revisionism of "New West" historians. Malone argued for a return to source materials such as diaries and memoirs of the time, which neither treated settlers and Native Americans as if they were in a John Wayne movie nor made them out to be homogeneous outcasts. Original source materials, he argued, showed the West to be diverse and much more interesting than the more common depiction of white hard-scrabble farmers made it out to be. According to Lang, Malone's emphasis on national and global factors in the history of the American West was controversial. Yet, it also had a significant impact at larger, reputable university history departments at Yale and Harvard.

Malone did not stop practicing his profession once he became a university administrator. Although he did not have as much time to conduct research and write as he was promoted, Safford characterized Malone's professional output as a university president as "absolutely extraordinary."

=== Published books ===
- The Search for Paradigm in Western American History, 1930-2000 (in progress, 1999; unfinished)
- Montana Century: 100 Years in Pictures and Words (1999); editor
- Montana: A Contemporary Profile (1997)
- James J. Hill: Empire Builder of the Northwest (1996)
- The American West: A Twentieth Century History (1989) with Richard W. Etulain
- Historians and the American West (1983) with Rodman W. Paul
- The Battle for Butte: Mining and Politics on the Northern Frontier (1981)
- Montana: A History of Two Centuries (1976) with Richard B. Roeder (1st ed.); with Roeder and William L. Lang (2d ed.)
- Montana As It Was, 1876: A Centennial Overview (1975) with Richard B. Roeder
- C. Ben Ross and the New Deal in Idaho (1970); editor
- The Montana Past: An Anthology (1969); editor with Richard B. Roeder

== Personal life ==
Michael P. Michael married Kathleen Campbell on April 18, 1983. He already had two children, Molly and Thomas. He became a stepfather to Kathy's children Clint, Molly, and Wendy.

He was survived in death by his wife, Kathy; his two children and three stepchildren, his stepfather, and his four foster siblings.
