= James R. Reid =

Canadian-American Presbyterian minister

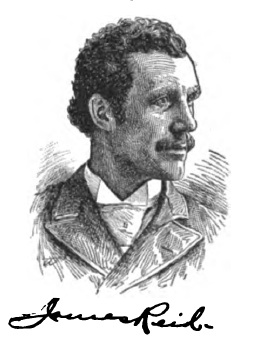
- James R. Reid in 1896

2nd President of Montana State University
- In office 1894–1904
- Preceded by: Augustus M. Ryon
- Succeeded by: James M. Hamilton

Personal details
- Born: 1849 Dundas County, Ontario, Canada
- Died: December 12, 1937 (about 88 years) Riverside, California, United States
- Spouse: Ella Holden Reid
- Children: Two
- Education: McGill University
- Profession: Teacher, college president
- Website: www.montana.edu

James R. Reid (1849 – December 12, 1937) was a Canadian American who was a Presbyterian minister. He served as the second president of Montana State University from 1894 to 1904.

== Life and career ==
James R. Reid was born in 1849 in Dundas County, Ontario, Canada, to Samuel and Nancy (Marlin) Reid. His father was an Ulster Scot born in County Londonderry, Ireland, and his mother was an Ulster Scot born in County Antrim, Ireland. His mother was born in 1812, and emigrated to Canada in 1828. Samuel and Nancy married in 1835, and Samuel died in 1860. Reid was one of 11 children, only seven of which survived into adulthood. Nancy Reid lived, never remarrying, until 1908.

Reid spent his childhood working on his father's farm, and attended local public school. After graduation from junior high school at the age of 16, he taught public school in a neighboring public school system. He later attended high school in Metcalfe, Ontario, although it is not clear if he graduated. After leaving high school, Reid worked in the lumber business for five years, then emigrated to the United States and spent two years working at various jobs in New York City.

Deciding to continue his education, Reid enrolled at the University of Toronto and then transferred to the Collegiate Institute in Hamilton, Ontario. He then transferred to McGill University, where he graduated with a bachelor's degree in 1881. Reid decided to enter the ministry, and studied theology for two years at Union Theological Seminary in New York city. This was followed by two more years of theological study at The Presbyterian College of Montreal, where he graduated with a Master of Divinity degree. He spent another year in theological study at the University of Edinburgh in Scotland.

About 1886, the First Presbyterian Church in Bay City, Michigan, called Reid to be their minister. He spent three years there, also acting as principal of the local high school and engaged in business. He moved back to New York City in 1889, where he spent a few months in graduate study again at Union Theological Seminary.

In the spring of 1889, Reid was appointed president of the College of Montana, a Presbyterian college in Deer Lodge, Montana. He also served as the pastor of the Prebysterian Church in the town. He was appointed to and was the first president of the Montana State Council of Education, serving from 1891 to 1894. He was elected president of the Montana State Teachers' Association (now MEA-MFT) in 1894, and served on the Montana State Board of Education for three years.

=== Montana State University ===
The Agricultural College of the State of Montana (now known as Montana State University) was founded in Bozeman, Montana, in February 1893. Its first president, Augustus M. Ryon, was a mining engineer who clashed with the college's Board of Regents and local businessmen about the direction of the college. Ryon wanted the school to focus on technical, mechanical, industrial, and engineering arts, while the regents and others wanted an agricultural focus. Ryon was forced out in 1894 and Reid named his successor.

The college grew quickly under Reid, who provided the campus with 10 years of stability and relative harmony. The school's first classes were held in rooms in the Gallatin County high school, and later that year in the shuttered Bozeman Academy (a private preparatory school). By the time Reid assumed the presidency of the college, the student body had grown so quickly that the college completely occupied the high school building. A vacant store on Main Street was also rented to provide additional classroom space. The college had long been promised 200 acres (810,000 m^{2}) of land on the south side of Bozeman, and the donation of land finally occurred in 1895. Under Reid, both the Agricultural Experiment Station (now known as Taylor Hall) and the Main Building (now known as Montana Hall) began construction in 1896. The agricultural building was the first to open, and both structures were occupied in 1898. To accommodate the rapid rise in enrollment, Reid also hired a large number of faculty. The university football team was established in 1897, and the college graduated its first four students that same year. The curriculum expanded into civil and electrical engineering in 1898.

According to Montana historians Pierce Mullen, Robert Rydell, and Jeffrey Safford, Reid ensured the college's survival. The state legislature had not clearly defined roles for either the Bozeman campus or its rival in Missoula (now the University of Montana). The lack of mission and the internecine battles with Ryon undermined support for the college, but Reid's moral authority, his popularity as a speaker, and his steady leadership made the Agricultural College a "viable shadow" to the Missoula school. "He put [Montana State University] on the right path," Mullen said.

Reid's vision for the college was practical and moral. He believed the curriculum at the school should emphasize skills students would need once they left campus. Thus, his focus was on agricultural architecture and engineering, agronomy, animal husbandry, and farming methods.

Reid also firmly believed the college should offer a moral education as well. The first three decades of the 20th century were rowdy ones on the college campus. Bozeman had a large red-light district by 1900, alcohol was plentiful and cheap, and there was little in the way of organized entertainment such as theaters to occupy the student body. President Reid spent much of his presidency cracking down on dancing, drinking, gambling, and prostitution by students.

Reid resigned for health reasons in 1904, and was succeeded as president by Dr. James M. Hamilton, an economist.

Montana State University Archives and Special Collections holds a collection of Reid's letters and photographs.

== Personal life, retirement, and death ==
Reid met Ella Holden while traveling in Montreal, Quebec, Canada, in 1902. He moved to Montreal in 1904 and married her. The couple had two children. The Reids moved to Riverside, California, in 1919. Reid died in Riverside on December 6, 1937.

== Bibliography ==
- National Cyclopedia of American Biography. New York: James T. White Co., 1896.
- Progressive Men of the State of Montana. Chicago: A.W. Bowen & Co., 1886.
- Smith, Phyllis. Bozeman and the Gallatin Valley: A History. Helena, Mont.: Falcon Press, 1996.
