= Geoff Gamble =

Geoff Gamble may refer to:

- Geoffrey Gamble (born 1942), American linguist
- Geoff Gamble (referee) (born 1977), Canadian soccer referee
