= Carl McIntosh =

Carl McIntosh may refer to:

- Carl McIntosh (musician), vocalist and guitarist in Loose Ends
- Carl W. McIntosh (1914–2009), American professor of forensics and acting
