= Geoffrey Gamble =

American linguist

11th President of Montana State University
- In office December 1, 2000 – December 22, 2009
- Preceded by: Michael P. Malone
- Succeeded by: Waded Cruzado

Personal details
- Born: 1942 (age 83–84) Fresno, California, United States
- Spouse: Patricia Moneyhan Gamble
- Education: California State University, Fresno; University of California, Berkeley
- Profession: Professor of Linguistics
- Salary: $133,000 a year (in 2000)
- Website: www.montana.edu

Geoffrey Gamble (born 1942) is an American linguist who served from 2000 to 2009 as the 11th president of Montana State University.

== Early life ==
Gamble was born in 1942 and raised on a farm near Fresno, California. His father was a cotton farmer with a seventh grade education who was dismissive of educational achievement. A veteran of World War II, Gamble's father wanted his son to become a boxer. His mother was a high school dropout (although she received her GED diploma later in life). The Gamble family was somewhat poor, and both boys and girls in the family were taught to cook, sew, and repair automobiles in order to be self-sufficient.

Gamble, however, valued education. He graduated from Fresno High School and attended Fresno State College (now California State University, Fresno), where he played football for a year. He quit playing after receiving such poor grades that he was nearly forced to leave school. He graduated with a bachelor's degree in English language and literature in 1965. He was the first and only person in his family to earn a college degree.

After college, Gamble took up a lucrative career selling insurance. During his seven years in the insurance industry, he was promoted to manager. He was in his early 30s when he started teaching a night class to aspiring insurance agents, and realized that he really wanted to teach.

Gamble enrolled again at Fresno State, and began to pursue a degree in law. But he switched to linguistics, and received a master's degree in 1971. By this time, Gamble had married and had children. He continued with his education and obtained a Ph.D. in linguistics from the University of California, Berkeley, in 1975. His specialty was Native American languages.

== Early academic career ==
After receiving his doctorate, Gamble served as a Fellow at the Smithsonian Institution in Washington, D.C., for a year. He then obtained a full-time teaching position in 1976 at Washington State University (WSU) in Pullman, Washington. He taught in the anthropology department for the next 12 years. Gamble was appointed interim vice provost for academic affairs at WSU in 1987. He was appointed to the job permanently in 1988, where he oversaw budgetary and personnel matters, planning, and implementation. One of his achievements as vice provost was to integrate WSU's satellite campuses more closely with the main campus.

Gamble left WSU in 1998 to accept a position as provost and senior vice president at the University of Vermont in Burlington, Vermont. In this role, Gamble oversaw the university's budget and all academic operations. His pay at the time was about $163,000 a year.

== Montana State University ==
=== Appointment ===
In December 1999, Montana State University president Michael P. Malone died suddenly of a heart attack. A nationwide search for a successor began immediately. Gamble says that he was not sought out for the job. Rather, he applied for the position after friends and colleagues urged him to do so.

Gamble was named the 11th president of Montana State University on October 5, 2000. More than 60 applicants sought the position. Gamble won the job over two other finalists — Dr. Larry Branen, Dean of the School of Agriculture at the University of Idaho, and Dr. Ann Weaver Hart, provost and vice president at Claremont Graduate University. (Dr. Hart was subsequently named the president of Temple University and is currently the president of the University of Arizona.) The vote to select Gamble was unanimous. Gamble's starting salary was $133,000 a year, and he assumed his position as president on December 1, 2000.

=== Achievements ===
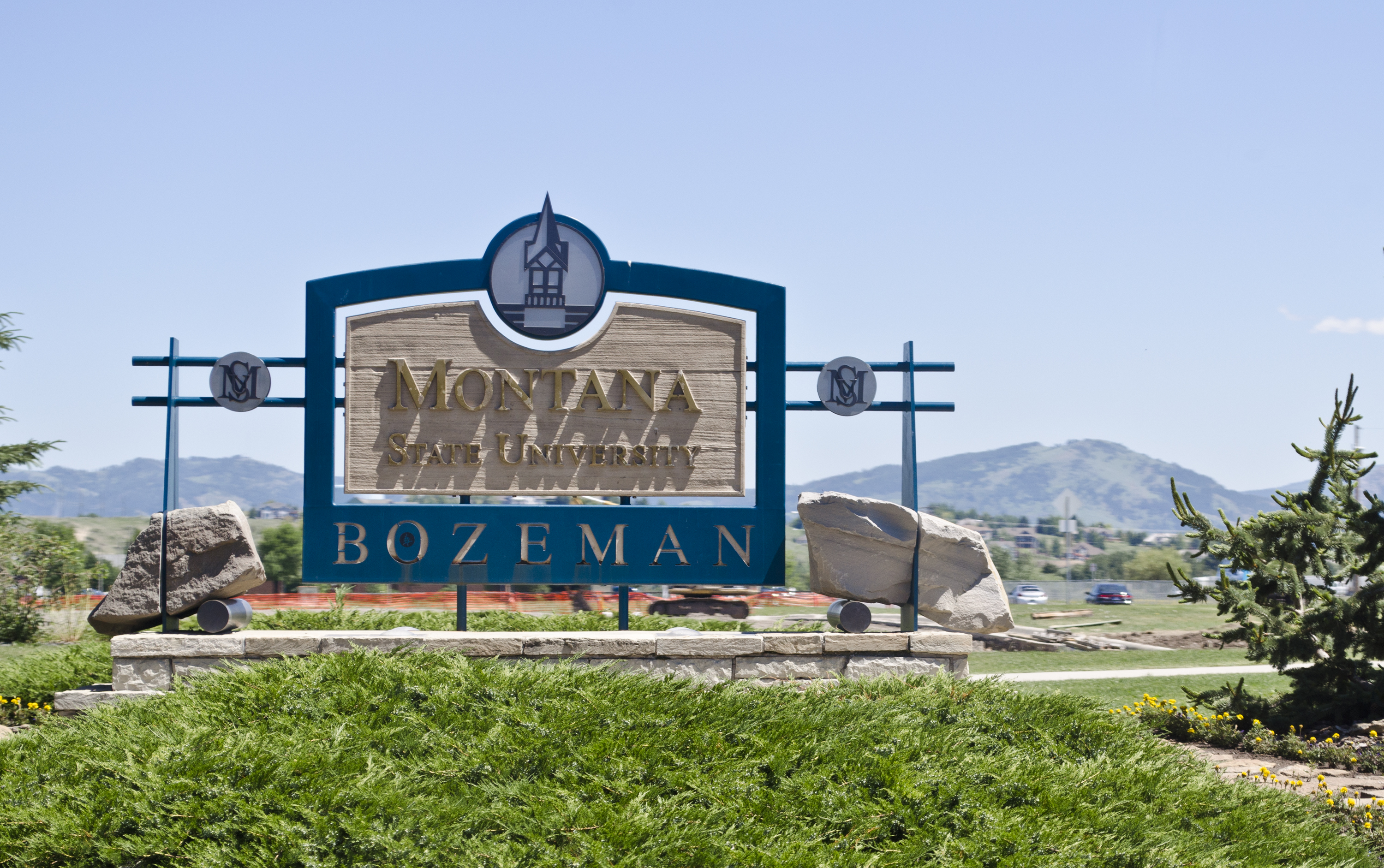
Gamble was president of MSU from 2000 to 2009.

Gamble's presidency was marked by openness and a consultative style of governance. He made it a goal to interact with faculty, staff, workers, and students as much as possible, and maintained an "open door" policy that permitted almost anyone to make an appointment to see him. He also doubled the size of the president's executive council to make it more representative. He assigned the university provost to attend the weekly Faculty Senate meetings , and met privately with faculty and administrative leaders about governance issues on a weekly basis. He established a new 25-member University Planning, Budget and Analysis Committee to establish the university budget, and made its deliberations and decisions accessible to the media. Gamble laid down one budgetary rule, however: The university would not initiate projects without having the money in-hand to complete them.

Gamble also sought to turn Montana State University into a research university. He encouraged faculty to conduct research and to apply for federal research grants, and the school actively sought out federal research money to renovate campus buildings. This effort was largely successful: Between 2000 and 2009, federal research funding at MSU grew by 61 percent to $98.4 million. In 2006, 2007, 2008, and 2009, MSU was the only university in Idaho, Montana, North Dakota, South Dakota, and Wyoming to be classified by the Carnegie Foundation for the Advancement of Teaching as having "very high research activity." Gamble also pressed for the university to be designated the "University of the Yellowstone" to reflect the high level of research MSU conducted in the greater Yellowstone National Park ecosystem. The university applied for a trademark on the name, and Gamble worked to establish and enlarge the Big Sky Institute in Big Sky, Montana (an interdisciplinary research and public outreach institute).

Gamble made enhancement of diversity a major effort of his presidency. The university lost a 1974 gender discrimination lawsuit brought by female faculty members. Gamble sought out women for leadership training activities, and encouraged their promotion within the university hierarchy. He appointed Cathy Conover to be vice president for communications and public affairs — making her the university's first permanent female vice president. By the time of his retirement, women outnumbered men among MSU's deans by five to four. Gamble also sought to integrate tribal colleges into MSU's teaching and governance structure as well. He appointed Dr. Henrietta Mann (chair of the MSU Department of Native American Studies) as a special assistant to the president's office. He also made Dr. Mann (one of the most prominent Indian educators in the United States) his personal representative to the seven tribal colleges which participate in the Montana University System. Gamble also created a Council of Elders to bring leaders of the tribal colleges together twice a year at MSU to discuss governance, academics, funding, and integration issues. Native American enrollment at MSU rose 79 percent (to a historic high of 377 students) during Gamble's time in office.

Legislatively, Gamble adopted an approach whereby university officials promoted MSU's accomplishments, praised legislators for their financial support (even when it was not forthcoming), and spoke of state funding for the university in terms of investment that led to economic and job growth. According to Conover, MSU's chief legislative lobbyist, Gamble's style was "a sea change" that led the Republican-dominated state legislature to rave about him.

Montana State University also implemented the "Core 2.0 curriculum" during Gamble's tenure as president. This program encourages undergraduate students to engage in research or practice their art prior to graduation.

Gamble also started a new tradition for the university president. Known as "Move-In Day", the president and other volunteers spend the first day of school helping students move into their dorm rooms. In 2011, Gamble was named in an interview with the Bozeman Daily Chronicle by three Montana State history professors--Jeffrey Safford, Pierce Mullen, and Robert Rydell—as one of the key MSU presidents who have built on the legacy of previous school presidents like William Tietz.

=== Sports scandal ===
In 2006, a major sports scandal engulfed Montana State University. MSU hired successful football coach Mike Kramer away from Eastern Washington University in 2000. By 2002, Kramer's Bobcats football squad was tied for first in its league and made it to the NCAA Division I-AA first round playoffs. Kramer's team succeeded in tying again for first in its league and making the playoffs in 2003, tied for first in its league again in 2005, and tied for second place in its league and made it to the NCAA Division I quarterfinal playoffs in 2006. By most measures, Kramer was a highly successful football coach.

On June 23, 2006, however, the body of local Bozeman man Jason Wright was discovered lying in an MSU experimental agricultural field on the edge of the MSU campus. He'd been kidnapped, beaten with a blunt object, and shot 10 times. Seven days later, former MSU basketball player Branden Miller and former MSU football player John LeBrum were charged with Wright's murder. Wright, a known cocaine dealer, was believed to have been murdered for drug-related reasons. After an 18-month investigation, six additional current and former MSU athletes — including former basketball player Aaron Rich, former football cornerback Andre Fuller, and former football wide receiver Rick Gatewood — were charged with buying and selling cocaine. Three of the six were charged with running a cocaine smuggling ring that sold 26 pounds (12 kg) of cocaine in Bozeman between June 2005 to May 2007.

Court records later revealed that the murder weapon was stashed in a locker in an MSU gymnasium, leading investigators to question whether the killers had help from current MSU staff or students. As the investigation deepened, a former MSU assistant basketball coach admitted that he knew Miller had carried handguns in his athletic bag at school, that Miller was using Wright's identity card, and that Miller had secreted the murder weapon and other handguns in Brick Breeden Fieldhouse. In August 2007, Sports Illustrated ran a front-page article, "Trouble in Paradise", that recounted drug use, violence, theft, intimidation, and illegal activities by current and former MSU student athletes and the complicity of low-level coaching staff. />

The crimes committed by the student-athletes led to an automatic, routine investigation by the NCAA. The NCAA found no recruiting violations by the school, although it cautioned that many recruiting practices were lax. However, the investigation revealed significantly lower graduation rates for MSU football and basketball players under football coach Mike Kramer as well as men's basketball coach Mick Durham, and a large number of athletes on or flirting with academic probation. Gamble quickly fired Kramer, who then sued MSU for unlawful dismissal.

Branden Miller was found guilty of murder in 2008 and sentence to 125 years in prison. Lebrum entered into a plea bargain agreement, and was sentenced to 50 years in prison. Kramer and MSU settled out of court, and Kramer received a payment of $240,000.

In 2009, Gamble said his hardest time as president was dealing with the sports scandal.

=== Criticisms ===
Gamble's tenure as president was not without criticism.

Faculty members Ed Mooney and Gary Harkin argue that Gamble's focus on research led to increased costs for undergraduates and less focus on high-quality undergraduate teaching. An internal university "report card", created by Gamble, showed that faculty and administrative fell under Gamble fell to just 78 and 73 percent, respectively, of the national average for like-sized universities.

When he retired, Gamble admitted that he failed to achieve some goals. These included launching the MSU Foundation's $100 million capital fundraising campaign, and raising $8 million to build a Native American Student Center.

== Post-MSU activities ==
Geoff Gamble was 58 years old when he was appointed president of Montana State University. Gamble and his wife, the former Patricia Moneyhan, decided before accepting the position that Gamble would retire in 2009 at the age of 67. Other events reinforced Gamble's decision to retire: Patricia Gamble was diagnosed with breast cancer in 2008, Gamble's mother was in frail health, and Gamble's daughter had given birth to a child.

Gamble announced his retirement on March 22, 2009. Gamble stayed on as an adjunct professor in the Department of Sociology and Anthropology, teaching one or two courses a semester.

Gamble was appointed interim senior provost at the University of North Texas (UNT) in August 2011. UNT president V. Lane Rawlins (WSU vice provost from 1982 to 1986, and a good friend of Gamble's) asked Gamble to take the job for a year as UNT searched for an individual to permanently take the position.

On May 15, 2012, Gamble was appointed UNT's vice president for research and economic development at UNT. In May 2013, he hired Dr. Thomas McCoy away from Montana State University. McCoy had been MSU vice president for research, creativity and technology transfer since 1998. McCoy took over at UNT's vice president for research and economic development, and Gamble took on a new position, vice president for strategy and operations.

=== Endowments ===
In October 2009, the Gambles bequeathed much of their wealth to Montana State University. Two endowments were made. One was the Florence and Monty Moneyhan Scholarship Endowment, created in honor of Patricia Gamble's parents. The other was an endowment for the Geoff and Patricia Gamble Center for Student Success. The center will assist students in learning habits and skills that will keep them in school as well as provide training to faculty to improve the quality of teaching. The two endowments totaled more than $2 million, and were called "unprecedented" for an MSU president. The Gambles attributed their wealth to the highly successful insurance career Geoff Gamble had in the 1970s, a lifetime of saving, and prudent investments.

In October 2010, the Gambles announced a $1 million gift to California State University, Fresno. One part of the gift will endow the Dr. Geoffrey and Patricia Gamble Professorship in Linguistics/Endangered Languages. The other part will establish the Dr. Geoffrey and Patricia Gamble Endangered Languages Program Endowment, which will provide financial support to scholars studying languages in danger of disappearing.

== Publications ==
- Wikchamni Grammar. University of California Press, 1978.
- Yokuts Texts. Mouton de Gruyter, 1994.
