= Steve Horn =

American politician (1931–2011)

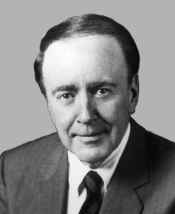

Member of the U.S. House of Representatives from California's 38th district
- In office January 3, 1993 – January 3, 2003
- Preceded by: Bob Dornan
- Succeeded by: Grace Napolitano

3rd President of California State University, Long Beach
- In office August 1, 1970 – February 13, 1988
- Preceded by: Carl W. McIntosh
- Succeeded by: Curtis McCray

Personal details
- Born: John Stephen Horn; May 31, 1931 San Juan Bautista, California, U.S.
- Died: February 17, 2011 (aged 79) Long Beach, California, U.S.
- Party: Republican
- Spouse: Nini Moore Horn
- Children: 2
- Education: Stanford University (AB); Harvard University (MPA); Stanford University (PhD)
- Profession: Professor

John Stephen Horn (May 31, 1931 – February 17, 2011) was President of California State University, Long Beach and later a five-term Republican United States Congressman from California from 1993 to 2003.

== Early life ==
Horn was born on May 31, 1931, in San Juan Bautista, California, Horn served in the United States Army Reserves from 1954 until 1962.

Horn earned his bachelor's degree from Stanford University in 1953 and went on to earn a Master of Public Administration from Harvard's Graduate School of Public Administration in 1955. In 1958 he earned his Ph.D. at Stanford University.

== Government service ==
In 1959, Horn became administrative assistant to Secretary of Labor James P. Mitchell. In 1960, he went to work for then U.S. Senator Thomas Kuchel (R-CA) as a legislative assistant and served in that capacity until 1966, when he left to become a Senior fellow at the Brookings Institution. Horn played a major role in the 1964 presidential campaign of Nelson Rockefeller in California. He also served as Vice Chairman of the U.S. Civil Rights Commission from 1969 to 1980 and as a member of the National Institute of Corrections from 1972 until 1988 (serving as chairman from 1984 until 1987).

== University president ==
Horn was President of California State University Long Beach from 1970 until 1988 when he stepped down to run for Congress.

As President of CSULB, Horn reformed the university's graduation and general education requirements to emphasize learning skills, cultural literacy, and interdisciplinary education, as well as creating the first university and human resource opportunities course requirement in the United States. Horn also gained passage of legislation allowing California's senior citizens to take courses for reduced fees on all 23 campuses of the California State University. Horn established one of America's first programs for women returning to college. He also created the CSULB Disabled Resources Center, which served as a model to institutions across the United States. Horn led the university through 11 major construction projects, including the North Campus Center and buildings for Engineering/Computer Science, Social Science/Public Affairs, and Student Services Administration.

== Congressional service ==
Horn first ran for Congress in 1988 in a race to succeed Republican Dan Lungren but lost the primary to conservative Dana Rohrabacher.

After the 1991 reapportionment, his home in Long Beach was drawn into the neighboring 38th district, then held by veteran Democratic incumbent Glenn M. Anderson. When Anderson announced his retirement in 1992, Horn jumped into the race to succeed him. He narrowly won an 8-way Republican primary before beating Anderson's stepson, then Long Beach city councilman Evan Anderson Braude, in the general election.

A moderate Republican, Horn won his Democratic-leaning district with relative ease four more times. In 1994 he rode the Republican tide to an easy victory over a weak opponent. In 1996, his reelection was eased when he became the only Republican west of the Mississippi River to be endorsed by the Sierra Club; In 1998 he once again bested his 1994 foe despite a strong year for Democrats statewide in California. Only in 2000 did he have a close race, beating Democrat Gerrie Schipske by less than 1 percent.

After the 2001 reapportionment, Democrats in the California legislature made this already Democratic-leaning district even more so. Horn subsequently announced his retirement and did not seek reelection in 2002. He did, however, give a surprise endorsement to Democrat Hector De La Torre, who ran to succeed Horn in the re-drawn seat (now numbered 39) and finished second to Linda T. Sánchez in the Democratic primary.

In 2003, Project on Government Oversight, a government watchdog group, awarded Horn with its first ever Good Government Award for his contributions to government transparency and oversight, particularly his advocacy for public access to government information.

== Death ==
Horn died on February 17, 2011, at the age of 79, of complications from Alzheimer's disease.

== Electoral history ==
Member, U.S. House of Representatives: 1993–2003
Year	Office	Democrat	Votes	Pct	Republican	Votes	Pct
1988	U.S. House of Representatives; District 42	Guy Kimbrough	78,772	33%	Steve Horn 20% Dana Rohrabacher 35% Harriet Wieder 22%	153,280	64%
1992	U.S. House of Representatives; District 38	Evan Anderson Braude 41% Bill Glazewski 11% Peter Mathews 27% Ray O'Neil 12%	82,108	43%	Dennis Brown 29% Steve Horn 30% Ted Poe 13%	92,038	49%
1994	U.S. House of Representatives; District 38	Peter Mathews	53,681	37%	Steve Horn	85,225	59%
1996	U.S. House of Representatives; District 38	Peter Mathews 49% Rick Zbur 51%	71,627	43%	Steve Horn	88,136	53%
1998	U.S. House of Representatives; District 38	Peter Mathews	59,767	43%	Steve Horn	71,386	52%
2000	U.S. House of Representatives; District 38	Erin Gruwell 29% Peter Mathews 26% Gerrie Schipske 32%	85,498	48%	Steve Horn	87,266	48%

Academic offices
Preceded by Carl W. McIntosh	President of California State University, Long Beach; August 1, 1970 – February 13, 1988	Succeeded by Curtis McCray
U.S. House of Representatives
Political offices
Preceded by Bob Dornan	Member of the U.S. House of Representatives from California's 38th congressional district January 3, 1993 – January 3, 2003	Succeeded by Grace Napolitano
Preceded by Theodore M. Hesburgh	Chairman of the United States Commission on Civil Rights (Acting); 1972–1974	Succeeded by Arthur Sherwood Flemming
