= Brock Tessman =

American academic

13th President of Montana State University
- Incumbent
- Assumed office 2025
- Preceded by: Waded Cruzado

Personal details
- Born: June 4, 1976 (age 49) Detroit, Michigan, USA
- Education: Brown University; University of Colorado Boulder

Brock Franklin Tessman (born 1976) is an American academic and academic administrator. In September 2022 Tessman was appointed the 17th president of Northern Michigan University; he assumed the office in February 2023. In April 2025 it was announced that he would step down from his position at NMU to become president of Montana State University.

Tessman was born at Henry Ford Hospital in Detroit, Michigan. He was raised in Plymouth, a western suburb of Detroit. Tessman later moved to California. He attended Brown University, where he graduated in 1998 with a Bachelor of Arts with honors in international relations. Tessman received a Master of Arts and Doctorate in international affairs and political science at the University of Colorado Boulder in 2001 and 2004, respectively. From 2006 to 2015 he taught at the University of Georgia as an assistant and later associate professor of international affairs. Tessman served as a professor of political science and Dean of the Davidson Honors College at the University of Montana from 2015 to 2018.

Brock Tessman is now the 13th president of Montana State University.
