= Waded Cruzado =

American university president

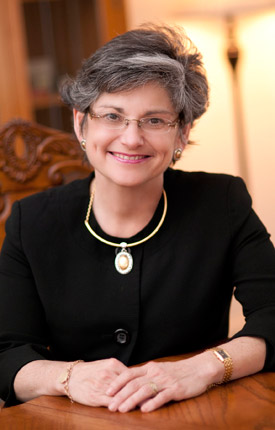
- Cruzado in 2012

12th President of Montana State University
- In office 2010–2025
- Preceded by: Geoffrey Gamble
- Succeeded by: Brock Tessman

Personal details
- Born: January 16, 1960 (age 66) Mayagüez, Puerto Rico
- Children: 2
- Education: University of Puerto Rico at Mayagüez (BA); University of Texas, Arlington (MA, PhD)

Academic background
- Thesis: El espejo. Arquetipo literario y estructura narrativa en la ficcion latinoamericana postmodernista: Carlos Fuentes y Manuel Puig (1990)
- Doctoral advisor: Jose G. Sanchez

Academic work
- Discipline: Spanish literature
- Institutions: University of Puerto Rico at Mayagüez; New Mexico State University; Montana State University

Waded Cruzado (born January 16, 1960) is a Puerto Rican professor of Spanish language and Spanish literature. She served as Interim President of New Mexico State University from 2008 to 2009, the 12th President of Montana State University from 2010 to 2025, and since 2025 has served as the 5th President of the Association of Public and Land-grant Universities.

== Early life ==
Waded Cruzado was born in 1960 in Mayaguez, Puerto Rico, to parents Morgan and Daisy. The oldest of four children, she had a brother and two sisters. She was raised in Mayaguez by her stepfather, Roberto, and her mother. Her grandparents were farmers, but her stepfather worked for a coffee as a trader for a company and her mother was a homemaker.

=== Education ===
When she was 10 years old, Cruzado's parents enrolled her in an all-girl parochial school in Mayaguez. Cruzado was the first person in her family to attend college, as she would later go on to enrolled at the University of Puerto Rico at Mayagüez. She graduated in 1982 magna cum laude with a bachelor's degree in comparative literature.

She immediately enrolled at the University of Texas at Arlington. She was the first person in her family to leave Puerto Rico and move to the mainland United States. She earned her master's degree in Spanish language and literature in 1984. She worked as a graduate teaching assistant in the school's Department of Foreign Languages and Linguistics from 1983 to 1986, and was appointed an Instructor there.

Cruzado next entered the doctoral program in the humanities from the University of Texas at Arlington. She received her Ph.D. in the humanities in 1990. While earning her doctorate, Cruzado was appointed an instructor in Spanish language at the Pontifical Catholic University of Puerto Rico in 1989.

== Academic career ==
Cruzado was appointed assistant professor in the Department of Humanities at the University of Puerto Rico at Mayagüez (UPRM) in 1990, and in 1999, became a full professor. Former students later described her as a good teacher, and one called her "charming, witty, outgoing and eloquent."

In 1993, just prior to her promotion to associate professor, Cruzado was named assistant dean for student affairs in the UPRM College of Arts and Sciences, a position she held until 1995. In 1997, she was elected and served a single term as the faculty representative on the UPRM Administrative Board. A year later, Cruzado was appointed the associate dean for academic affairs in the UPRM College of Arts and Sciences, but after serving only a few months she was appointed as dean. Cruzado left UPRM in 2003 to become dean of the College of Arts and Sciences at New Mexico State University (NMSU), where her fundraising secured donations to endow three professorships.

On September 1, 2007, Cruzado was named executive vice president and provost of NMSU. In 2008, the NMSU Board of Regents appointed Cruzado the interim president. She was the first woman and the second Hispanic president of the school.

== Presidency of Montana State University ==
Montana State University President Geoffrey Gamble announced his retirement on March 22, 2009. After a nationwide search, Cruzado was one of three finalists. Cruzado was offered the presidency of MSU on October 14, 2009. She accepted the following day. She became the 12th President of Montana State University, and her first day in office was January 4, 2010. Her official inauguration was held September 10, 2010.

In May 2013, Cruzado's salary was reported to be $289,466 a year. With other compensation and benefits, her total remuneration was $335,173 a year. According to the Chronicle of Higher Education, her salary was ranked 167th out of 212 public college presidents surveyed.

One of Cruzado's earliest announced goals was to more closely integrate the units of the MSU System of campuses in Billings, Havre, and Great Falls. Cruzado said she would place a much greater emphasis on integrating the two-year schools into MSU, a concept she called "one university."

In 2010, Cruzado began a push to create a full two-year community college at MSU. That resulted in the College of Technology–Great Falls programs, renamed Gallatin College MSU, moving to campus in August of that year and initially offering programs in aviation, design drafting, interior design, and welding.

In September 2012, MSU adopted a strategic plan at Cruzado's behest titled "Mountains and Minds, Learners and Leaders." Its top goals increasing enrollment, improving graduate rates, reducing student attrition, increasing the number of faculty members doing research, reducing greenhouse gas emissions, promoting student and faculty community service, increasing online course offerings and raising pay.

On January 15, 2013, approximately 100 MSU faculty met in an off-campus meeting and issued a press release that identified complaints pertaining to concerns that the rapid student enrollment meant a degeneration of quality education at MSU, as there would be an apparent lack in faculty, staff, and facilities. On January 17, 2013, Cruzado met face-to-face with three faculty members who facilitated the off-campus meeting, taking the concerns "very seriously".

On August 12, 2024, Cruzado announced her plans to retire from Montana State in June 2025. Several months later, the Association of Public and Land-Grant Universities announced that Cruzado would become its next president in July 2025.

== Other roles ==
In November 2012, President Barack Obama appointed Cruzado to the Board for International Food and Agricultural Development (BIFAD), a seven-member council that advises the United States Agency for International Development on agriculture, nutrition, and rural development issues related to global food insecurity. Cruzado served on the board until 2020, and while she was a member, she chaired the selection committee for the BIFAD Award for Scientific Excellence in a Feed the Future Innovation Lab and engaged with higher education partners in West Africa. In 2015, Cruzado hosted the board at Montana State University and brought tribal college leaders into dialogue with BIFAD about their role in addressing poverty, nutrition, and food security.

In the aftermath of the Boston Marathon bombing, the University of Massachusetts Dartmouth appointed Cruzado chair of a three-person task force on the recruitment and support of international students, and emergency planning. Also serving on the task force were Susan Herbst, president of the University of Connecticut, and James Bueermann, president of the Police Foundation. The task force was asked to complete its work by August 15, 2013.

== Honors ==
Cruzado was named the 2011 Michael P. Malone Educator of the Year by the Montana Ambassadors for demonstrating outstanding accomplishment, excellence and leadership in the field of education. She was also recognized as a Paul Harris Fellow by Rotary International and, in November 2012, the Association of Public and Land-grant Universities awarded her the Seaman A. Knapp Memorial Lectureship, in honor of the founder of the Cooperative Extension Service.

== Published works ==
Dr. Cruzado has published a number of professional articles and reports. Among these are:

- Cruzado, Waded. "Aire, Mar, Tierra: La Literature Infantile y la Education Ambiental." Atenea. 16:1-2 (1995).
- Cruzado, Waded. "El Agua, la Fuente, el Espejo: Las Obsesiones Duplicantes de Carlos Fuentes." Sea Grant College Program. 1:1 (1993).
- Cruzado, Waded. "La Huela Arabe en la Literature Medieval." Atenea. 11:1-2 (1992).
- Cruzado, Waded. "Prologue, Roasario Ramos Perea." Te Canta el Coqui. Mayaguez: Gallo Galente, 1997.
- Cruzado, Waded. "Taking Another Look at Bilingualism." Vista. 3:6 (1989).
- Frehill, Lisa M.; Serrano, Elba; and Cruzado, Waded. Effective Strategies to Diversify STEM Faculty: A Toolkit. Arlington, Va.: National Science Foundation, 2005.

== Personal life ==
Cruzado was married to Rodolfo Mazo, but the marriage ended in divorce. The couple had two children.

== Bibliography ==
- Who's Who in the West. 41st ed. Chicago: Marquis Who's Who, 2013. ISBN 978-0-8379-0945-5
