= College of Montana =

- Trask Hall
- U.S. National Register of Historic Places
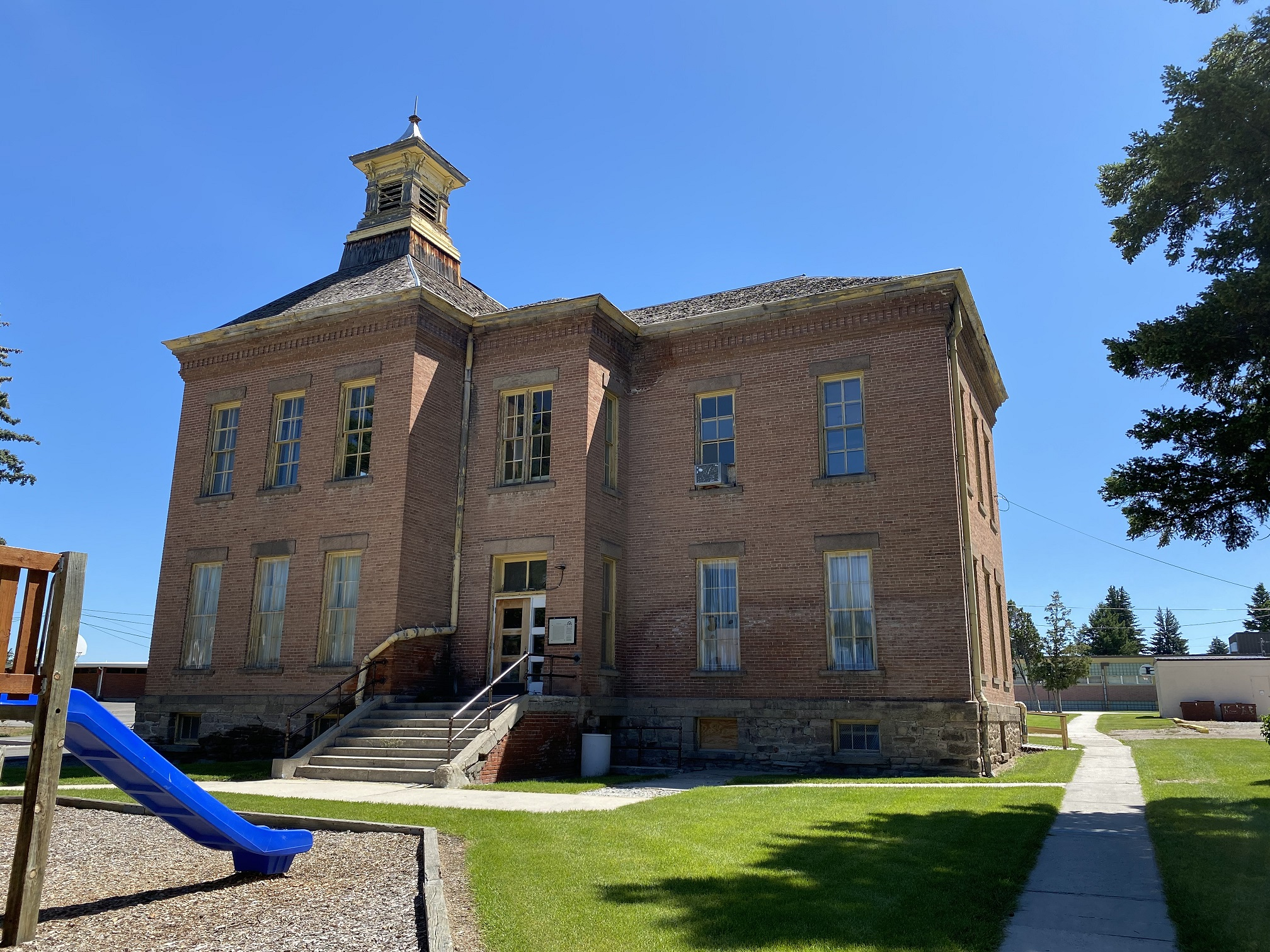
- Trask Hall

- Location within Montana Location within the United States
- Location: 703 5th Ave. Deer Lodge, Montana
- Coordinates: 46°23′40″N 112°43′52″W
- Area: less than one acre
- Built: 1878
- Architect: Henry Lord Gay
- NRHP reference No.: 82003178
- Added to NRHP: April 30, 1982

The College of Montana was a private liberal arts college that existed in Deer Lodge, Montana, in the late 19th and early 20th centuries. Founded in 1878 as the "Montana Collegiate Institute", the school was the first institution of higher learning in Montana. The College of Montana name was adopted in 1883. For much of its existence, the college was affiliated with the Presbyterian Church.

Strapped for funding and suffering from a limited enrollment, the school had an erratic existence and finally closed for good in 1916. Seven years later, the organization of the College of Montana merged with that of Montana Wesleyan College to form Intermountain Union College, located in Helena, Montana. Intermountain Union, in turn, later merged with the Billings Polytechnic Institute to form Rocky Mountain College.

Buildings from the former College of Montana campus still survive in Deer Lodge, including Trask Hall, which is listed on the National Register of Historic Places.

== Notable people ==
Probably the best-known person once associated with the College of Montana was literary critic Irving Babbitt, who taught at the school for a time. Theodore M. Brantley, later chief justice of the Montana Supreme Court, taught at the college for several years. Augustus M. Ryon founded the college's School of Mines in 1888, and was named the first president of Montana State University in 1893. James R. Reid, who served as the college's president from 1891 to 1893, became the second president of Montana State University.

== Gallery ==
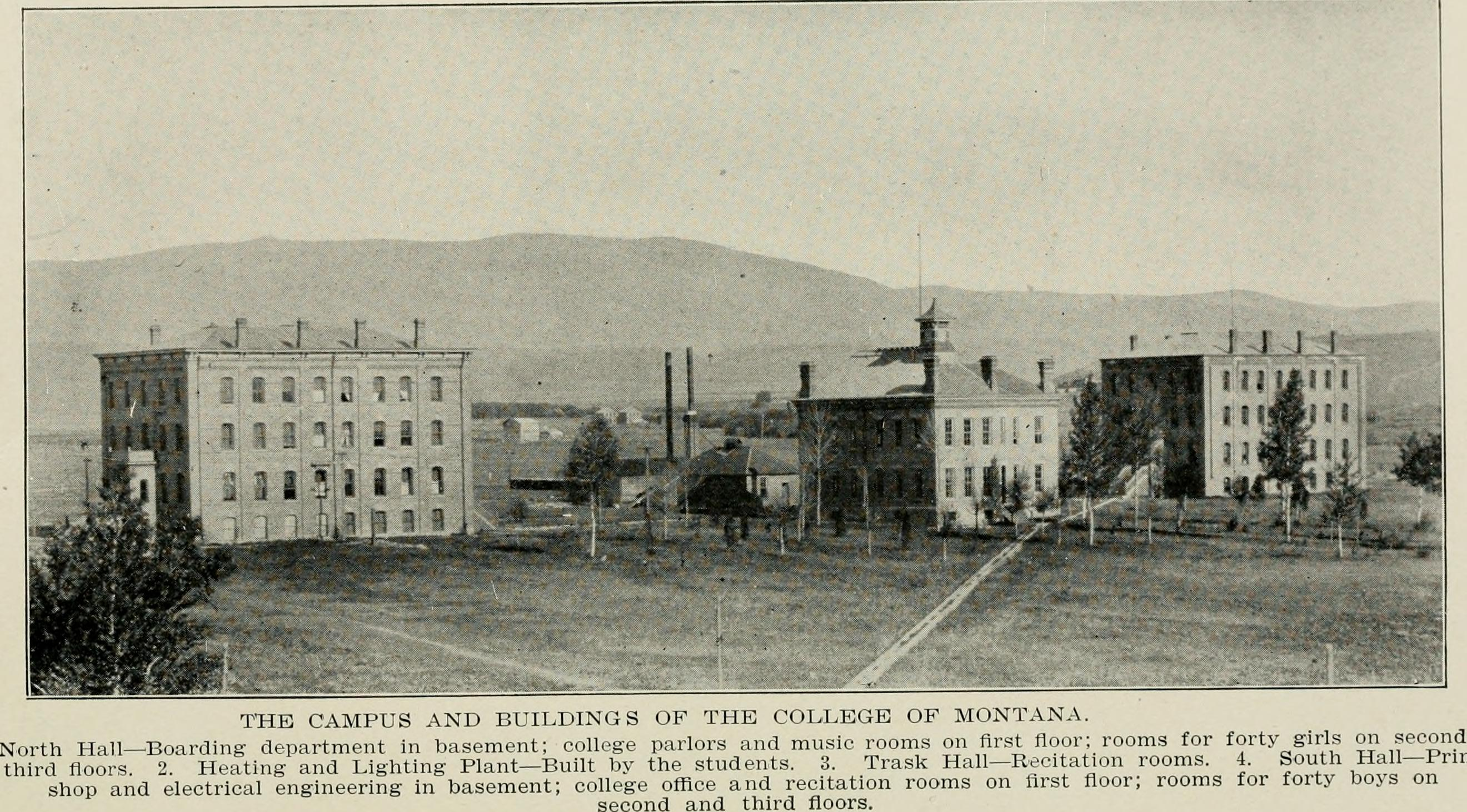
Campus and buildings of the College of Montana

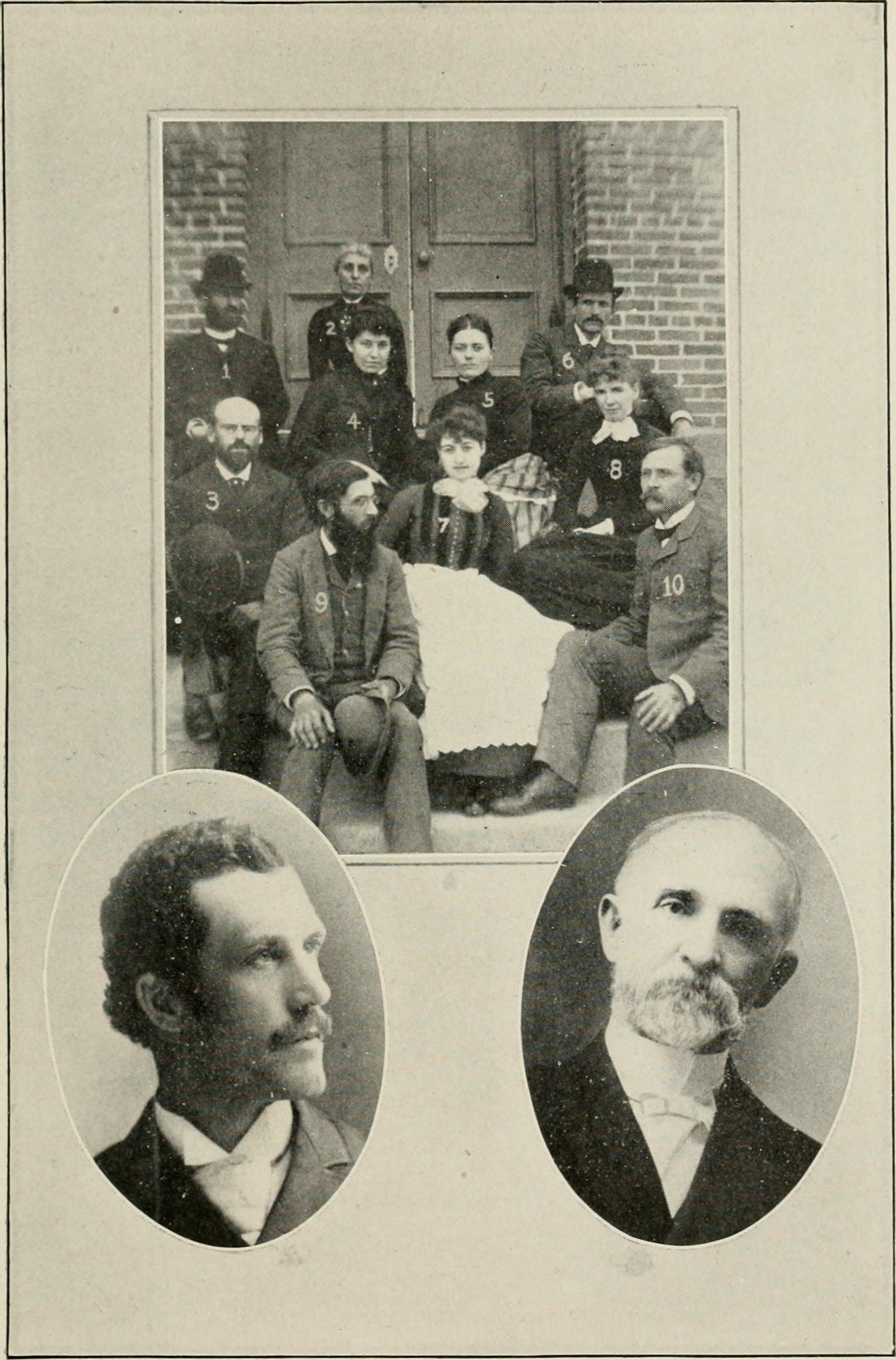
The faculty of 1887
