= Augustus M. Ryon =

American mining engineer (1862–1949)

1st President of Montana State University
- In office 1893–1894
- Succeeded by: James R. Reid

Personal details
- Born: 1862 New York City, New York, United States
- Died: 1949 (aged 86–87) Flushing, New York, United States
- Spouse: Hariet L. Alward Ryon
- Children: Frederick L., Winnifred M.
- Education: Columbia University
- Profession: Teacher, mining engineer
- Website: www.montana.edu

Augustus Meader Ryon (1862–1949) was an American mining engineer who served as the founding president of Montana State University. He also has the distinction of having the shortest tenure of any president of the university, only a single year.

== Life and career ==
Ryon was born in New York City, New York, in 1862 to John R. and Mary (Chappell) Ryon. He was the second of four children, preceded by his brother Frederick in 1860, and followed by Willie in 1864 and John in 1868. He was raised in Connecticut, where his father was born, and in Brooklyn, New York.

He enrolled in the School of Mines at Columbia University, and graduated in 1886 with a Bachelor of Science in mining engineering. He was engaged as an assistant engineer on the drinking water supply system in New London, Connecticut, from 1886 to 1887, then worked from 1887 to 1888 as an assistant to F. N. Owen, the chief engineer for the city of New York.

In 1888, Ryon traveled to Montana where he founded the School of Mines at the College of Montana, a Presbyterian college in Deer Lodge, Montana. He was elected second vice-president of the Montana Society of Civil Engineers in 1894, and first vice-president in 1895.

The Agricultural College of the State of Montana (now known as Montana State University) was authorized by the Montana state legislature in 1892, and opened on February 16, 1893. Luther Foster, a horticulturalist and one of two faculty members, was named Acting President. Short on funds, lacking a campus, and with Montana still mostly wilderness without many professionals, the Agricultural College found it difficult to hire faculty. So it began poaching faculty from the College of Montana.

=== Montana State University ===
Ryon, too, was poached from the College of Montana. He was named the first president of the college on April 17, 1893. Ryon immediately clashed with the board of trustees and faculty. Where the trustees (mostly businessmen from Bozeman, Montana) wanted the college to focus on agriculture, Ryon pointed out that few of its students intended to go back to farming. While the rapidly expanding faculty wanted to establish a remedial education program to assist unprepared undergraduates (Montana's elementary and secondary public education system was in dire shape at the time), Ryon refused. Ryon was forced out in 1895 and replaced by the Rev. Dr. James R. Reid, a Presbyterian minister who had been president of the Montana College at Deer Lodge since 1890.

Ryon returned to the faculty at the Agricultural College. He'd spent much of 1894 working on new irrigation systems and methods, and he continued to teach agricultural and mining engineering at the college. But in 1897, the Board of Regents was again growing frustrated with the focus of the college, and demanded the resignation of all faculty. Only those of Ryon, Luther Foster, and Benjamin Maiden (an English professor) were accepted.

=== Post-academic career ===
Ryon returned to New York City in 1897. He became a merchant, opening a home coal delivery business in 1898 and a cement business some time before 1906.

Ryon died at his home in Flushing, New York, in the spring of 1949.

== College legacy ==
In 1911, the college began construction on a massive engineering laboratory building. Completed in 1923, the structure was named the A.M. Ryon Engineering Laboratories in 1939 in Ryon's honor. The huge structure, which had a monitor roof, contained the electrical engineering facilities and materials testing facilities. Two wings were added in 1952. For many years, the wings of the structure was leased by the engineering laboratory of the Montana State Department of Highways, while the older part of the building was turned into a gas and steam engineering laboratory. The structure was demolished in the late 1990s to make way for the new Engineering and Physical Sciences Building.

== Personal life ==
Ryon married Harriet L. Alward on August 5, 1895. She was born in Wathena, Kansas, in 1869 to Ephriam and Mary W. (Morris) Alward. The Ryons had four children. Frederick L. Ryon was born in 1889 in Montana. Their other children were born in New York City: Winifred Warder Ryon in 1897, Emily Morris Ryon in 1902, and Frances Chappell Ryon in 1905.

== Bibliography ==
- Brown, Charles Carroll, ed. Directory of American Cement Industries and Hand-Book for Cement Users. 4th ed., rev. and enl. Indianapolis, Ind.: Municipal Engineering Co., 1906.
- Columbia University. Annual Report of the President of Columbia College Made to the Board of Trustees, May 4, 1885. New York: Macgowan and Slipper, 1885.
- Columbia University. Catalogue of Officers and Graduates of Columbia University From the Foundation of King's College in 1754. 16th ed. New York: Columbia University, 1916.
- "Deaths." College & University Business. July 1949.
- Hull, Arthur M. and Hale, Sydney A. Coal Men of America: A Biographical and Historical Review of the World's Greatest Industry. Chicago: The Retail Coalman, 1918.
- Lists of the Alumni of the Schools of Science of Columbia University, 1899. New York: Columbia University, 1899.
- Office of Education. Report of the Commissioner of Education for the Year 1893-1894. Vol. 2. U.S. Department of the Interior. Washington, D.C.: Government Printing Office, 1896.
- Rydell, Robert; Safford, Jeffrey; and Mullen, Pierce. In the People's Interest: A Centennial History of Montana State University. Bozeman, Mont.: Montana State University Foundation, 1993.
- Smith, Phyllis. Bozeman and the Gallatin Valley: A History. Helena, Mont.: Falcon Press, 1996.
