= Association of Public and Land-grant Universities =

American research, policy, and advocacy organization

- Abbreviation: APLU
- Formation: October 1887
- Legal status: Active
- Headquarters: Washington, D.C.
- Members: 251 Colleges, Universities and Higher Education Organizations
- President: Waded Cruzado
- Staff: 70
- Website: www.aplu.org
- Formerly called: American Association of Agricultural Colleges and Experiment Stations (1887–1926) Association of Land-Grant Colleges and Universities (1926–1954); American Association of Land-grant Colleges and State Universities (1954–1963) National Association of State Universities and Land-grant Colleges (1963–2009)

The Association of Public and Land-grant Universities (APLU) is a research, policy, and advocacy organization of public research universities, land-grant institutions, state university systems, and higher education organizations. It has member campuses in all of the United States as well as the District of Columbia, four U.S. territories, Canada, and Mexico.

== History ==
The roots of APLU were established in October 1887 as the American Association of Agricultural Colleges and Experiment Stations, making it North America's oldest higher education association. The first annual convention was held that year in Washington, D.C. at the U.S. Department of Agriculture (USDA), and Pennsylvania State University president George W. Atherton was elected president of the Board of Directors. Through the years, APLU has undergone a number of name changes to reflect its growing public higher education mission. In 1919, the Land-Grant Colleges Engineering Association merged with the association. A few years later in 1926, the organization changed its name to the Association of Land-Grant Colleges and Universities. In 1963, the American Association of Land-Grant Colleges and Universities merged with the National Association of State Universities to form the National Association of State Universities and Land-Grant Colleges (NASULGC). On March 30, 2009, the association adopted its current name—Association of Public and Land-grant Universities.

Former names of the Association	Years active
American Association of Agricultural Colleges and Experiment Stations	1887-1926
Association of Land-Grant Colleges and Universities	1926 - 1954
American Association of Land-grant Colleges and State Universities	1954-1963
National Association of State Universities and Land-grant Colleges (NASULGC)	1963-2009
Association of Public and Land-grant Universities (APLU)	2009–present

== Organizational structure ==
=== Association leadership ===
In 2025, former Montana State University President Waded Cruzado became the fifth president of APLU.

Name	Title	Years served
Russell I. Thackery	Executive Secretary	1945-1969
Ralph K. Huitt	Executive Director	1969-1979
Robert L. Clodius	President	1979-1992
C. Peter Magrath	President	1992-2005
M. Peter McPherson	President	2005-2022
Mark P. Becker	President	2022-2025
Waded Cruzado	President	2025-Current

=== Board of directors ===
The 26-member Board of Directors is the governing body of the association.

== Membership ==
The association has more than 250 members including: all land-grant institutions; R1 and R2 public research universities; state university systems; and affiliated organizations. These institutions include 79 U.S. land-grant institutions, 19 of which are among the 23 historically black colleges and universities that are APLU members. There are also eight Canadian and five Mexican public research universities.

=== Membership involvement ===
APLU members serve on councils and commissions. APLU Councils are composed of university administrators with similar job functions who come together to address critical issues and expand their knowledge base within their professional area of expertise. APLU Commissions cut across job function to enable individuals from multiple disciplines across universities to address critical issues and expand their knowledge base in areas of common interest.

=== Membership criteria ===
Membership in APLU is automatically granted to land-grant institutions per the Morrill Land-Grant Acts of 1862, 1890, and 1994. Public universities classified among "R1: Doctoral Universities – Very high research activity" or "R2: Doctoral Universities – High research activity" are also eligible for membership.

=== Members ===
From:

==== University Systems ====
- California State University System
- City University of New York System
- Colorado State University System
- North Dakota University System
- Southern Illinois University System
- Southern University System
- State University of New York System
- State University System of Florida
- Texas A&M University System
- Texas Tech University System
- University of Alabama System
- University of Alaska System
- University of California
- University of Colorado System
- University of Hawai‘i System
- University of Illinois System
- University of Massachusetts System
- University of Missouri System
- University of Nebraska system
- University of North Carolina System
- University of Tennessee System
- University of Texas System
- University of Wisconsin System
- University System of Georgia
- University System of Maryland

==== Universities by Jurisdiction ====
Canada

- Dalhousie University
- University of Alberta
- The University of British Columbia
- University of Calgary
- University of Guelph
- University of Saskatchewan
- University of Western Ontario
- Queen's University at Kingston

Mexico

- Autonomous University of Nuevo León
- National Autonomous University of Mexico
- National Polytechnic Institute of Mexico
- University of Guadalajara
- University of Veracruz

Micronesia

- College of Micronesia-FSM

United States

⠀⠀Alabama

- Alabama A&M University
- Auburn University
- Tuskegee University
- University of Alabama
- University of Alabama at Birmingham
- University of Alabama in Huntsville
- University of South Alabama

⠀⠀Alaska

- University of Alaska Fairbanks

⠀⠀American Samoa

- American Samoa Community College

⠀⠀Arizona

- Arizona State University
- Northern Arizona University
- University of Arizona

⠀⠀Arkansas

- Arkansas State University
- University of Arkansas
- University of Arkansas at Pine Bluff

⠀⠀California

- California Polytechnic State University, San Luis Obispo
- California State University, Fresno
- California State University, Fullerton
- California State University, Northridge
- California State University, Sacramento
- San Diego State University
- San José State University
- University of California, Berkeley
- University of California, Davis
- University of California, Irvine
- University of California, Los Angeles
- University of California, Merced
- University of California, Riverside
- University of California, San Diego
- University of California, Santa Barbara
- University of California, Santa Cruz

⠀⠀Colorado

- Colorado School of Mines
- Colorado State University
- University of Colorado at Boulder
- University of Colorado Denver

⠀⠀Connecticut

- University of Connecticut

⠀⠀Delaware

- Delaware State University
- University of Delaware

⠀⠀District of Columbia

- University of the District of Columbia

⠀⠀Florida

- Florida A&M University
- Florida Atlantic University
- Florida International University
- Florida State University
- University of Central Florida
- University of Florida
- University of North Florida
- University of South Florida

⠀⠀Georgia

- Augusta University
- Fort Valley State University
- Georgia Institute of Technology
- Georgia Southern University
- Georgia State University
- Kennesaw State University
- The University of Georgia

⠀⠀Guam

- University of Guam

⠀⠀Hawai'i

- University of Hawaiʻi at Mānoa

⠀⠀Idaho

- Boise State University
- University of Idaho

⠀⠀Illinois

- Illinois State University
- Northern Illinois University
- Southern Illinois University at Carbondale
- University of Illinois Chicago
- University of Illinois at Urbana-Champaign

⠀⠀Indiana

- Ball State University
- Indiana University
- Indiana University-Purdue University Indianapolis
- Purdue University

⠀⠀Iowa

- Iowa State University
- University of Iowa

⠀⠀Kansas

- Kansas State University
- University of Kansas
- Wichita State University

⠀⠀Kentucky

- Kentucky State University
- University of Kentucky
- University of Louisville

⠀⠀Louisiana

- Louisiana State University and Agricultural & Mechanical College
- Louisiana Tech University
- Southern University and A&M College
- University of Louisiana at Lafayette
- University of New Orleans

⠀⠀Maine

- University of Maine

⠀⠀Maryland

- Morgan State University
- United States Naval Academy
- University of Maryland, Baltimore County
- University of Maryland, College Park
- University of Maryland Eastern Shore
- University of Maryland Global Campus

⠀⠀Massachusetts

- Massachusetts Institute of Technology
- University of Massachusetts Amherst
- University of Massachusetts Boston
- University of Massachusetts Dartmouth
- University of Massachusetts Lowell

⠀⠀Michigan

- Central Michigan University
- Michigan State University
- Michigan Technological University
- Oakland University
- University of Michigan
- Wayne State University
- Western Michigan University

⠀⠀Minnesota

- University of Minnesota
- University of Minnesota Duluth

⠀⠀Mississippi

- Alcorn State University
- Jackson State University
- Mississippi State University
- The University of Mississippi
- The University of Southern Mississippi

⠀⠀Missouri

- Lincoln University
- Missouri University of Science and Technology
- University of Missouri-Columbia
- University of Missouri-Kansas City

⠀⠀Montana

- Montana State University
- University of Montana

⠀⠀Nebraska

- University of Nebraska–Lincoln
- University of Nebraska Omaha

⠀⠀Nevada

- University of Nevada, Las Vegas
- University of Nevada, Reno

⠀⠀New Hampshire

- University of New Hampshire

⠀⠀New Jersey

- Montclair State University
- New Jersey Institute of Technology
- Rowan University
- Rutgers, The State University of New Jersey
- Rutgers University-Camden
- Rutgers University-Newark

⠀⠀New Mexico

- New Mexico State University
- The University of New Mexico

⠀⠀New York

- Binghamton University, SUNY
- City College of New York, CUNY
- Cornell University
- Stony Brook University, SUNY
- SUNY Polytechnic Institute
- University at Albany, SUNY
- University at Buffalo, SUNY

⠀⠀North Carolina

- East Carolina University
- North Carolina A&T State University
- North Carolina State University
- University of North Carolina at Chapel Hill
- University of North Carolina at Charlotte
- University of North Carolina at Greensboro
- University of North Carolina at Wilmington

⠀⠀North Dakota

- North Dakota State University
- University of North Dakota

⠀⠀Northern Mariana Islands

- Northern Marianas College

⠀⠀Ohio

- Bowling Green State University
- Central State University
- Cleveland State University
- Kent State University
- Miami University
- Ohio State University
- Ohio University
- University of Akron
- University of Cincinnati
- University of Toledo
- Wright State University

⠀⠀Oklahoma

- Langston University
- Oklahoma State University
- University of Oklahoma

⠀⠀Oregon

- Oregon State University
- Portland State University
- University of Oregon

⠀⠀Pennsylvania

- The Pennsylvania State University
- Temple University
- University of Pittsburgh

⠀⠀Puerto Rico

- University of Puerto Rico at Mayagüez

⠀⠀Rhode Island

- University of Rhode Island

⠀⠀South Carolina

- Clemson University
- South Carolina State University
- University of South Carolina

⠀⠀South Dakota

- South Dakota School of Mines and Technology
- South Dakota State University
- University of South Dakota

⠀⠀Tennessee

- East Tennessee State University
- Middle Tennessee State University
- Tennessee State University
- University of Memphis
- University of Tennessee, Knoxville

⠀⠀Texas

- Prairie View A&M University
- Tarleton State University
- Texas A&M University
- Texas State University
- Texas Tech University
- University of Houston
- University of North Texas
- University of Texas at Arlington
- University of Texas at Austin
- University of Texas at Dallas
- University of Texas at El Paso
- University of Texas at Tyler
- University of Texas at San Antonio
- University of Texas Rio Grande Valley

⠀⠀Utah

- University of Utah
- Utah State University

⠀⠀Vermont

- University of Vermont

Virgin Islands

- University of the Virgin Islands

⠀⠀Virginia

- College of William & Mary
- George Mason University
- James Madison University
- Old Dominion University
- University of Virginia
- Virginia Commonwealth University
- Virginia Polytechnic Institute & State University
- Virginia State University

⠀⠀Washington

- University of Washington
- Washington State University

⠀⠀West Virginia

- Marshall University
- West Virginia State University
- West Virginia University

Wisconsin

- University of Wisconsin-Madison
- University of Wisconsin-Milwaukee

Wyoming

- University of Wyoming
