= Carl W. McIntosh =

American college president (1914–2009)

8th President of Montana State University
- In office 1970–1977
- Preceded by: Leon H. Johnson
- Succeeded by: William Tietz

Personal details
- Born: December 1, 1914 Redlands, California, U.S.
- Died: January 19, 2009 (aged 94) Bozeman, Montana, U.S.
- Spouse: Mary Carroll Donnelly McIntosh (divorced)
- Children: 1
- Education: University of Redlands; University of Iowa
- Profession: Professor of forensics and acting
- Website: www.montana.edu

Carl Weston McIntosh, Jr. (December 1, 1914 – January 19, 2009) was an American professor of forensics and acting. He served as president of Idaho State College (now Idaho State University) from 1947 to 1959. He was acting executive dean when the college achieved its independence from the University of Idaho in March 1947, and he elevated it into a four-year, bachelor's degree-granting institution in December 1948. He left Idaho in 1959 to become president of Long Beach State College (now known as California State University, Long Beach). He oversaw the college's rapid growth from less than 10,000 students to 28,000 and two name changes (to California State College at Long Beach in 1964 and to California State College, Long Beach in 1968). He was named president of Montana State University in 1970. He established the university's nursing and pre-medical education programs and completed its first football stadium and creative arts complex, but also faced a years of fiscal austerity imposed by the state legislature. He retired in 1977.

== Life and career ==
=== Early life and education ===
Carl McIntosh was born on December 1, 1914, in Redlands, California, to Carl Weston and Cora Lulu (Williams) McIntosh. His father was born in Bay City, Michigan, on September 20, 1883. He moved to California in 1887 and became a real estate salesman. His mother, Cora Lulu Williams, was born in Morristown, Tennessee, on November 8, 1882. Her family moved to California in 1899.

McIntosh attended public schools in Redlands, and graduated from Redlands High School in 1932. He loved collecting insects, and drew extensive pictures of them. He received a bachelor's degree from the University of Redlands in 1936. He participated on the speech and debate team at the college, and won several national competitions. He considered majoring in entomology, but decided speech and debate were more fun. He then entered the University of Iowa, where he received his Master of Arts degree in 1937 and his Ph.D. in 1939. Both professional degrees were in speech communication. He studied music and voice at the Trinity College of Music in London, United Kingdom, for a short period of time in 1945, then entered the University of Redlands where he received his doctor of laws degree in 1952.

While engaged in his studies, McIntosh obtained an appointment as an instructor in forensics (public speaking) at Park College in Parkville, Missouri. He served as a time as acting head of his department. In 1939, McIntosh accepted a position as an instructor of forensics at what was then known as the Southern Branch of the University of Idaho. He was attracted to the college because it was in the mountains and McIntosh could indulge his love of fishing. He was promoted to assistant professor of speech in 1940.

In 1943, McIntosh enlisted in the United States Army. He served in several capacities with the War Manpower Conservation Division and the Information and Education Division in the United Kingdom. He was the assigned to the Supreme Headquarters Allied Expeditionary Force (SHAEF), during which he saw service in Belgium, France, and Germany. His wife was pregnant with their daughter, and moved in 1943 to be with her family in Missouri. She gave birth to Diana in 1944. McIntosh received an honorable discharge in 1946, and when he returned to the United States he saw his 18-month-old daughter for the first time.

=== Idaho State College and Long Beach State College ===
McIntosh returned to Idaho and resumed teaching. He was promoted to associate professor of speech, and served as director of the Summer Session and as Acting Executive Dean in 1947. In March 1947, the Southern Branch was made independent and renamed Idaho Southern College. The departing Executive Dean, John R. Nichols, was so impressed with McIntosh's public speaking skills that he successfully persuaded the board of regents to appoint McIntosh the first president of the new college. At 32 years of age, he was one of the youngest college presidents in the United States. Although McIntosh was not originally interested in being an administrator, once the school became an independent college he decided he wanted to remain president and see it through its early growing pains.

McIntosh left Idaho in 1959 to become president of Long Beach State College. The college, founded in 1949, had received a permanent campus in 1950 and had grown rapidly in enrollment under its first president, Peter Victor Peterson. While McIntosh was president, Long Beach grew tremendously. Enrollment surged from about 10,000 to more than 30,000, and he rapidly expanded and revamped the curriculum. McIntosh tripled the number of faculty and constructed 30 new buildings. Although the 1960s were a period of deep unrest on American college campuses, McIntosh's collegial governing style, gentle and quiet demeanor, and willingness to permit protest on campus (so long as it remained quiet and peaceful) helped keep Long Beach State relatively quiet throughout the period. In 1967, the California state legislature revamped the state college system. Long Beach State changed its name in 1968 to California State College, Long Beach, as part of these changes and began to be much more closely integrated into the California State College system.

McIntosh left Long Beach in 1969, and became president of Montana State University in 1970.

=== Montana State University ===
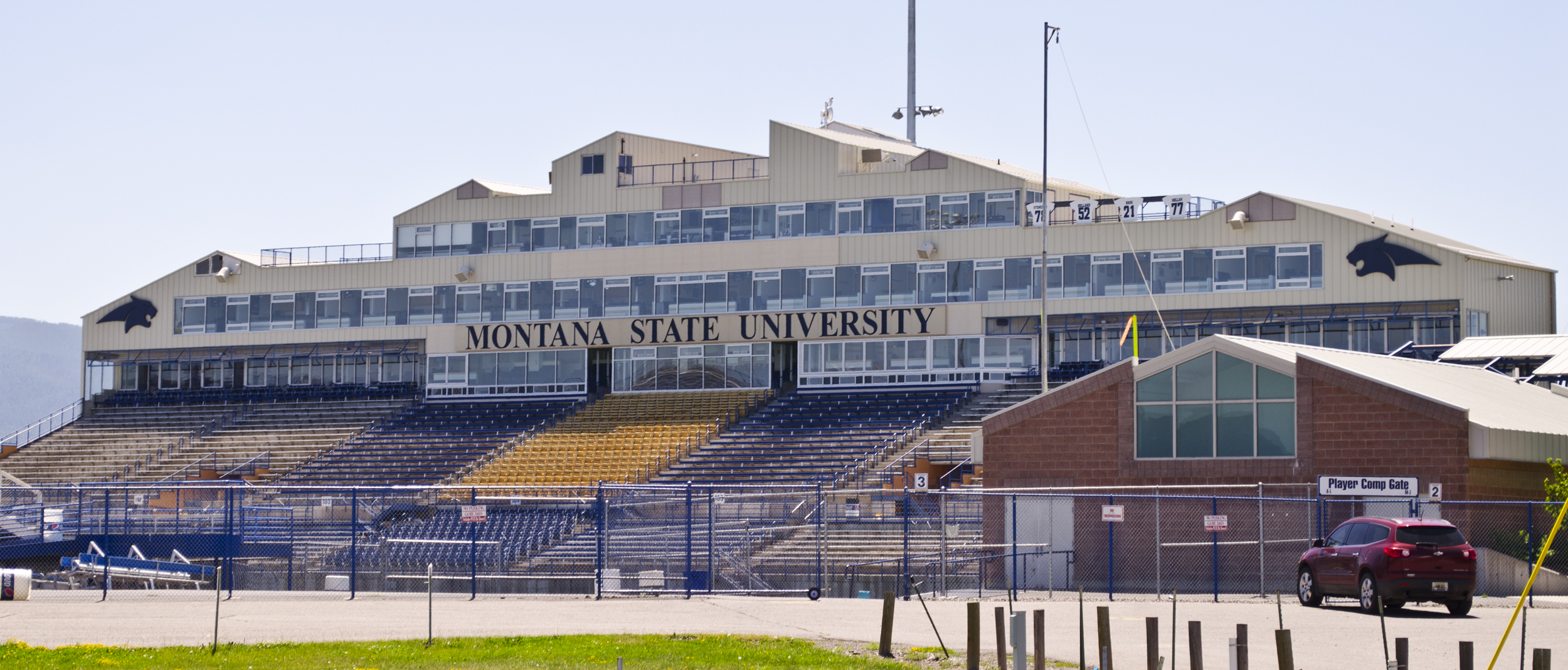
Bobcat Stadium, shown here in 2013, opened in 1973 and was originally known as Reno H. Sales Stadium. It received its current name in 1998.

Dr. Carl W. McIntosh was named MSU's eighth president in June 1970.

McIntosh brought a consultative and deliberate style of decision-making to the university. He faced a poor fiscal climate: The state was entering a decade-long depression brought about by a steep drop in commodity prices, the state's higher education system had grown too large and unwieldy, and Governor Thomas L. Judge had established a blue-ribbon committee to close several of the state's colleges. In 1974, women faculty at MSU sued, alleging gender discrimination. They won their suit in 1976, leading to a $400,000 damages award, a back-pay award, and extensive promotions (which also increased salaries). To accommodate these fiscal realities, McIntosh ordered several doctoral and master's degree programs terminated, and all advanced degree programs in the social sciences and liberal arts canceled.

But McIntosh also scored a number of successes. In 1972, he persuaded the legislature to allow MSU to participate in the Washington, Wyoming, Alaska, Montana, and Idaho (WWAMI) medical program, which allowed 20 MSU graduates a year to complete medical school at the University of Washington. The college of nursing (Sherrick Hall) was finished in 1973, and after three long years of construction Reno H. Sales Stadium (now Bobcat Stadium and Martel Field) and the Marga Hosaeus Fitness Center both opened. In 1974, the long-planned Creative Arts Complex (Cheever Hall, Haynes Hall, and Howard Hall) was also completed. Unfortunately, major increases in inflation led to significant design changes. Instead of a 1,200-seat concert hall with superb acoustics, a cramped and aurally dead 260-seat auditorium was built. Finally, in 1976, the university completed the new medical science building, Leon Johnson Hall.

McIntosh's arrival at MSU coincided with a confidential report by state auditors which revealed that the university's accounting system was 80 years of out date. Although not a single incident of embezzlement or misuse of funds had occurred (a fact McIntosh found remarkable), the state legislature seized on the report to denounce MSU as "irresponsible" and "profligate" in its spending.

In 1976, the "hidden million" controversy ended McIntosh's tenure as president. In 1975, Montana's first Commissioner of Higher Education, Dr. Lawrence K. Pettit (a former MSU professor of political science) launched an investigation of several Montana colleges and universities. He was particularly interested in MSU, where McIntosh's laid-back governance style was widely considered to have hurt the university. In March 1976, Pettit announced he was confiscating $1 million in surplus student fees from MSU — money he argued the university was trying to hide from state auditors and the legislature. In fact, the monies were the result of excessively high enrollment in the 1974–1975 school year, and were intended to help see the university through the 1975–1976 school year (when the legislature would not meet, and thus could not provide the needed budgetary boost to handle the over-enrollment). Pettit all but accused MSU and McIntosh of fraud, and McIntosh refused to attack Pettit's statements as mischaracterizations and slander. The public outcry about the "hidden million" led the Board of Regents to consider whether to request McIntosh's resignation. On June 30, 1976, by 4-to-3 vote, the Montana state commission of higher education voted to retain him. But McIntosh was unable to recover from the scandal. His low-key leadership style, the constant fiscal battles with the legislature, and the continuing attacks by Pettit led the university's board of regents to request McIntosh's resignation on June 30, 1977, which he tendered. (Pettit resigned the following year, his combative attempt to turn the commissioner's office into a sort of chancellorship having failed.)

== Retirement and death ==
McIntosh continued to live in Bozeman after his retirement. He lived alone, assisted in his later years by friends, receiving his meals from Meals on Wheels, and receiving regular deliveries of books from the Bozeman Public Library. For many years after his retirement, his successor, William Tietz, got together with McIntosh every few minutes to discuss current events, Montana State University, the state of Montana, Bozeman, and other topics. The meetings continued until McIntosh's death.

McIntosh was a popular public speaker, and gave several commencement addresses in retirement. He fished often, wrote poetry, and was constant reader. By one count, he read more than 2,400 books between 1977 and his death in 2009. In 2008, McIntosh donated his extensive boyhood beetle collection to Montana State University.

Carl W. McIntosh died on January 19, 2009, at his home in Bozeman, Montana. No cause of death was reported. He requested no funeral.

== Personal life ==
On August 22, 1939, he married Mary Carroll Donnelly in Slater, Missouri. A daughter, Diana, was born in 1944. A second daughter, Catherine, was born in 1951 and died the same year.

The McIntoshes later divorced. Mary Donnelly McIntosh died in 2005.

== Legacy and awards ==
Idaho State University renamed its new, $1 million Red Hill student housing complex the Carl W. Mcintosh Manor after him in November 1976.

Long Beach State University renamed its Humanities Office Building, erected during McIntosh's tenure as president, the Mcintosh Humanities Building in 1980 in his honor. In 1995, Montana State University named its newly completed forty-eight unit family housing complex "McIntosh Court" in his honor.

McIntosh received several awards during his lifetime. Among them are an honorary professorship bestowed by Tamagawa University in 1962 and a "Famous Fifty" Distinguished Alumnus Award from the Pi Kappa Delta honorary society in 1963.

== Bibliography ==
- Beal, Merrill D. and Wells, Merle W. History of Idaho. New York: Lewis Historical Publishing Company, 1959.
- California Department of Education. The California State Colleges. Sacramento, Calif.: California State Department of Education, 1955.
- Rydell, Robert; Safford, Jeffrey; and Mullen, Pierce. In the People's Interest: A Centennial History of Montana State University. Bozeman, Mont.: Montana State University Foundation, 1993.
- Teacher Education Programs in the United States: A Guide. Westport, Conn.: Praeger, 2004.
