= Jeffrey J. Safford =

American history professor (1934–2021)

Jeffrey Safford
- Born: Jeffrey Jaeger Safford; May 14, 1934; Greenwich Village, Manhattan, New York, U.S.
- Died: January 1, 2021 (aged 86); Bozeman, Montana, U.S.
- Spouse: June Safford
- Children: 4

Academic background
- Education: Wagner College (AB, MS); Rutgers University (PhD)

Academic work
- Discipline: History
- Sub-discipline: Historic preservation History education
- Institutions: Montana State University

Jeffrey Jaeger Safford was a professor emeritus of history at Montana State University-Bozeman and prominent proponent of historic preservation in Montana.

== Early life and education ==
Jeffrey Jaeger Safford (1934-2021) was born in Greenwich Village, New York, in 1934 to Hildegard Anna Clara Jaeger and Raymond Maurice Safford. He grew up in Staten Island, New York. with his two siblings. Safford attended Wagner College on a baseball scholarship where he majored in history and music, receiving his A.B. in music in 1956. In 1957, Safford was deployed to Baumholder, Germany. After receiving his PhD in history from Rutgers University in 1968, Safford was hired by Montana State University as an assistant professor in history.

== Career ==
Following Safford's employment with Montana State University beginning in 1968, Safford continued to advance his career in history education. From 1972 to 1977, Safford served as an associate professor in history. Beginning in 1977 until Safford's retirement in 1991, he was a Professor in History. Safford was awarded the title of Professor Emeritus in History and Philosophy for his work at the university. Safford published over 25 professional articles and several books during his time employed at the university, including "The Montana Livestock Industry through Oral History" and The Mechanics of Optimism: Mining Companies, Technology, and the Hot Spring Gold Rush, Montana Territory, 1864-1868. Safford focused on maritime history—one of several research focuses—and taught graduate courses at Mystic Seaport in Connecticut for ten years, which resulted in the publication of the co-authored book of maritime history America and the Sea.

In the late 1990s, Safford's interests shifted and he began focusing on the history of the American West, studying mining history and conducting interviews to contribute to oral history projects such as the Montana Oral History Project. Beginning in the 1980s, Safford started researching the history of Red Bluff, Montana, a former mining town. He also conducted extension research into the history of several mining companies, including Nelson Mining Company, Herschel Mining Company, and the Hot Springs Gold & Silver Mining Company. His research focused primarily on Red Bluff and Hot Springs, Montana during the 19th century. In later years, Safford worked on preserving the historic stone structure in Red Bluff that was subsumed as part of Montana State University's Agricultural Research Station. In 2006, the structure burned and the building was not restored. Safford is quoted as saying, "The Stone House was historically significant as one of the best preserved stone structures representative of early Montana Territorial gold mining...It was also architecturally significant as one of only three existing Montana examples of the Greek Revival style," and noted that the Montana Preservation Alliance listed the Stone House as one of Montana's most endangered structures in 2002.

Safford worked extensively in collaboration with the music department at Montana State University to host music symposiums. These events include "Bach in Bozeman," a symposium held in 1985 to celebrate the 300th anniversary of Bach's birth. In 1991, Safford organized "Mozart in Montana" to celebrate the 200th anniversary of Mozart's death. Six years later in 1997, Safford collaborated again with the MSU music department to organize and host "Brahms in Bozeman," a celebration of the 100th anniversary of Brahms' death. The last of the four symposiums that Safford worked on was "Mendelssohn in Montana: A Humanistic and Artistic 200 Years Commemoration" which was held in 2009 in Bozeman, Montana as a celebration of renowned German composer Felix Mendelssohn's 200th birthday.

Montana State University Archives and Special Collections holds Jeffrey J. Safford's contributions to the Montana State Centennial Project that culminated in the book In the People's Interest: A Centennial History of Montana State University, which Safford co-authored with Pierce Mullen and Robert Rydell, also professors of history at Montana State University-Bozeman. These materials are gathered in Collection 2364. Upon Safford's death in 2021, the majority of his research materials on Red Bluff and his notes, correspondence, and plans for the many music symposiums he worked on were transferred to the Montana State University Archives and Special Collections. These materials will join the existing materials in Collection 2364 and will be renamed Collection 2364: Jeffrey J. Safford Papers, 1985-1993 upon the completion of their processing.

== Personal life ==
Safford met his wife June (née Billings) while attending Wagner College, and they married on December 22, 1957.

After Stafford was hired by MSU, he moved with his wife and two children to Bozeman, Montana. Safford and his wife had two more children in the years following the move to Bozeman. Safford was an avid birder with a life list of 654 North American species. He was also involved in Bozeman Symphonic Choir with his wife June for over 25 years, and participated in Berkshire Choral Festivals in New Mexico, Massachusetts, and Austria.

== Publications ==
- Wilsonian Maritime Diplomacy, 1913- 1921. (Rutgers University Press, 1978).
- In the People's Interest: A Centennial History of Montana State University. (Montana State University, 1993).
- America and the Sea: A Maritime History. (Mystic Seaport Museum, 1998).
- The Mechanics of Optimism: Mining Companies, Technology, and the Hot Spring Gold Rush, Montana Territory, 1864-1868. (University Press of Colorado, 2011).
- "The Montana Livestock Industry through Oral History." (Agricultural History Vol. 49: No.1, January 1975).
- "The Nixon-Castro Meeting of 19 April 1959." (Diplomatic History, Vol. 4: No. 4, Fall 1980).
- "United States Maritime Policy and Diplomacy during the "Phony War," 1939-1940." (International Journal of Maritime History, June 1, 1989).
- "The Pacific Coast Maritime Strike of 1936: Another View." (Pacific Historical Review, Vol. 77: No. 4, November 2008.)
