= Pierce Mullen =

American historian (1934–2022)

Pierce Cornelius Mullen
- Born: March 4, 1934; Hastings, Nebraska
- Died: March 16, 2022 (aged 88); Bozeman, Montana
- Education: B.A. Hastings College, 1957 M.A. University of Nebraska, 1958 PhD in History University of California-Berkeley, 1964
- Occupation: Professor of History
- Employer: Montana State University
- Spouse: Margaret Mullen
- Children: 2

Pierce Mullen (March 4, 1934 – March 16, 2022) was a professor of history at Montana State University in Bozeman, Montana and was a participant in the Lewis and Clark Trail Heritage Foundation and the Quest for Knowledge Club.

== Personal life ==
Pierce Mullen was born on March 4, 1934, in Hastings, Nebraska to Neil Mullen and Ruth Pierce. Following his graduation at age 16 from St. Cecilia High School in Hastings, Mullen went on to study at St. Benedict College in Atchinson, Kansas. He completed his B.A. at Hastings College in 1957. A year later, in 1958, Mullen received his M.A. from the University of Nebraska. In 1964, Mullen earned his PhD in history from the University of California-Berkeley. Mullen served in the United States Air Force at the James Connally Air Force Base in Waco, Texas, where he worked as a military historian. He was honorably discharged in 1955. Mullen met his wife Margaret (Margie, née Montague) in 1957 when he was working as a seasonal ranger in Yellowstone National Park and she was working seasonally at the soda fountain at Fishing Bridge in her summer off from teaching middle school in Cut Bank, Montana. They were married in a private ceremony a year later in 1958 in Missoula, Montana, after which they moved to California where Mullen earned his PhD.

== Career ==
Upon completing his PhD at the University of California-Berkeley, Mullen accepted a job at then-Montana State College and moved to Bozeman, Montana. Mullen would become instrumental in the establishment of bachelor's and master's criteria for what would become the Department of History in 1964. While at Montana State, Mullen focused his research on the history of science and military history. He went on to become the Department Head of History, Government and Philosophy from 1969 to 1975. He retired from Montana State University in 1996. Mullen participated in National Humanities summer grants at Harvard, UC Santa Barbara, and West Point. He was also a founding member of the Montana Committee for the Humanities (now Humanities Montana), where, in 1972, he and other founding members met with officials of the National Endowment of the Humanities to discuss the formation of a Montana state humanities council. Mullen also helped to establish the Montana Governor's Humanities Award in 1995, and participated in the Montana Constitutional Convention. In 1993, Mullen co-authored In the People's Interest: A Centennial History of Montana State University with Jeffrey J. Safford and Robert Rydell. After Mullen's retirement in 1996, he led Lewis and Clark tours for Elderhostel (now Road Scholar), and participated and helped organize—alongside Dr. Volney Steele—a series of lectures in coordination with Montana State University's WWAMI Program about the history of medicine in Montana. Mullens was also deeply involved in local organizations, including holding the position of President for the Headwaters Chapter of the Lewis and Clark Trail Heritage Foundation, a member of the Quest for Knowledge Club, and a member of the AROHE (Association of Retirement Organizations in Higher Education).

== Publications ==
- A Record of Achievement: The American Simmental Association. (The American Simmental Association, 1989).
- In the People's Interest: A Centennial History of Montana State University (Montana State University, 1993).
- "Bitterroot Enigma: Howard Taylor Ricketts and the Early Struggle against Spotted Fever." (Montana: The Magazine of Western History, Winter 1982).
- "Montanans and “the Most Peculiar Disease":The Influenza Epidemic and Public Health, 1918–1919." (Montana: The Magazine of Western History, Spring 1987).
- "The Soviet Catastrophe." (October 16, 1994).
- "Liberty's Rainbow: The Bicentennial of the Louisiana Purchase." (January 23, 2003).
- "We Are What We Eat, Wherein Gargantua Visits the Land of the Rich and the Gluttonous and Meets the Tribe of Ectomorphs." (February 19, 2008)
- "Quarks and Demons." (October 2010).

== Legacy ==
Many of Mullen's published materials are held at Montana State University Archives and Special Collections, including his books and materials related to the Quest for Knowledge Club (Q.K. Club) of which he was a member until his death.
