= The Graduate School =

The Graduate School may refer to:

- The Graduate School at Montana State University
- Graduate School USA
