= Alfred Atkinson (university president) =

Canadian-American academic (1879–1958)

Alfred B. Atkinson

4th President of Montana State University
- In office 1919–1937
- Preceded by: James M. Hamilton
- Succeeded by: A. L. Strand

12th President of University of Arizona
- In office 1937–1947
- Preceded by: Paul Steere Burgess
- Succeeded by: James Byron McCormick

Personal details
- Born: October 6, 1879 Seaforth, Ontario, Canada
- Died: May 16, 1958 (aged 78) Tucson, Arizona, United States
- Spouse: Barbara Miller Atkinson
- Education: Iowa State University; Cornell University
- Profession: Professor of Agronomy
- Salary: $10,000 (Univ. of Arizona)

Alfred B. Atkinson (October 6, 1879 – May 16, 1958) was a Canadian American agronomist who served as the President of Montana State University from 1919 to 1937 and the University of Arizona from 1937 to 1947. He made a number of advances in farming methods, and developed the "Montana 36" wheat cultivar.

== Life and career ==
Alfred Atkinson was born on a farm near Seaforth, Ontario, in Canada on October 6, 1879. His parents were Joseph and Isabella A. (Burns) Atkinson, His paternal grandparents were James and Sarah (Cotton) Atkinson, who emigrated to Canada from Bradford, County of York (W.R.), United Kingdom.

He attended Ontario Agricultural College from 1899 to 1902, but left without earning a degree. He then enrolled at Iowa State University and graduated with a Bachelor of Science degree in agronomy in 1904. He obtained a position as an assistant agronomist at Iowa State's agricultural experiment station in 1902, and served there until 1904.

Atkinson was named an associate professor of agronomy at Montana State College (MSC) in 1904, and served there until 1906. He also served during this time as an agronomist with the MSC agricultural experiment station. He was promoted to professor of agronomy in 1906. During his time as an academic, he published numerous papers on dryland farming, nitrate formation, soil moisture control, soil science, and agricultural practice. He developed several new farming methods, and developed a new cultivar of wheat named "Montana 36".

Atkinson became a naturalized American citizen in 1911, and obtained a Master of Science degree from Cornell University in 1912.

During World War I, Congress enacted the Food and Fuel Control Act (also known as the "Lever Act") to promote food production for the war effort. The United States Food Administration was established to implement the act, and an administrator appointed in each state to oversee these efforts. Atkinson was appointed Food Administration administrator for the state of Montana, and traveled the state extensively giving speeches, promoting modern agricultural practices, and exhorting farmers and ranchers to produce more.

== University presidencies ==
=== Montana State College ===
Atkinson was appointed President of Montana State College in 1919. He received his doctorate from Iowa State University in 1920.

Atkinson had the second-longest tenure as president (as of 2013) of any person at Montana State College, one which lasted 18 years (1919 to 1937). A firm believer in his predecessor's vision for the school, Atkinson worked hard to continue the rapid expansion of the campus. The iconic, domed Gymnasium Building (now Romney Gym) was built in 1922, replacing a dilapidated "drill hall" and giving the school's men's basketball team its first home court. The Heating Plant, Lewis Hall, and Roberts Hall followed in 1923. By the 1920s, the school was commonly referred to as Montana State College (MSC). Herrick Hall opened in 1926. The college was justifiably proud of its academic accomplishments, but its sports teams entered a golden age as well. In 1922, Atkinson hired George Ott Romney and Schubert Dyche as co-head coaches of the football and men's basketball teams. Between 1922 and 1928 (the year he departed Montana for Brigham Young University), Romney's football teams compiled a 28–20–1 record. This included the 1924 season in which his team went undefeated until the final game of the year. As co-head basketball coach, Romney's teams compiled a 144–31 record and invented the fast break. After Romney left, Schubert Dyche coached the "Golden Bobcats" team of 1928–29, which had a 36-2 record and won the national championship. In his seven years as basketball coach, Dyche's teams compiled a 110–93 record (this included the dismal 1932–33 and 1933–34 seasons), but won their conference championship twice. In 1930, the college built Gatton Field, a football field on what is now the site of the Marga Hosaeus Fitness Center. In one of President Atkinson's last accomplishments, the Dormitory Quadrangle (now Atkinson Quadrangle) was built.

The first three decades of the 20th century were rowdy ones on the college campus. Bozeman, Montana, had a large red-light district by 1900, alcohol was plentiful and cheap, and there was little in the way of organized entertainment such as theaters to occupy the student body. Like his two predecessors, President Atkinson sought to reduce what he believed were immoral student activities. Atkinson Quadrangle was built on the location of the "Bobcat Lair", a popular student drinking and dancing hangout, as part of this program.

The college suffered greatly during the Great Depression. The price of agricultural products (Montana's economic mainstay) soared during World War I, as European and Russian farms were devastated by military campaigns and American and European armies demanded food. For a few years after the war, these prices stayed high. But as European agriculture got back on its feet, an agricultural depression swamped the United States beginning about 1923. State tax revenues plunged, and fewer buildings were constructed on campus after 1923. The United States entered the Great Depression in 1929. President Franklin D. Roosevelt established the Public Works Administration (PWA) in 1933 to provide federal funding for public works construction as a means of economic stimulus. But President Atkinson was strongly opposed to Roosevelt's New Deal, and refused to accept PWA funds to expand the college. With the state unable to assist, Montana State College stagnated through the 1930s.

=== University of Arizona ===
Atkinson served as president of the University of Arizona (UA) from 1937 to 1947. During his tenure, enrollment doubled and he greatly expanded the campus.

Atkinson wished to undertake a rapid expansion of UA much as he had at MSC. He was not successful at first. When he tried to demolish Old Main in 1938, alumni reaction was so negative that he was forced to cancel the plan. Campus growth was slow, with only Pima Hall and the James Douglas Memorial Building for Mines and Metallurgy (built with a private donation) constructed prior to World War II.

Enrollment, already low due to the Great Depression, dropped lower as young men enlisted or were drafted during World War II. The curriculum was significantly altered to emphasize vocational skills demanded by war production, and the United States Navy took over a number of campus buildings (including Old Main) and began training men and women for military service. One of the few scholastic changes which occurred during the war was the promotion of the School of Business and Public Administration into a college, and a change in governance that brought UA and the other two state universities under a single Board of Regents.

After the war, the G.I. Bill and the end of the war led to a rapid rise in enrollment. To handle the significant influx of new students, Atkinson approved the construction of 114 Quonset huts on campus. Intended to be temporary, the Quonset huts lasted until the mid-1980s.

== Retirement and death ==
After he retired, he served until 1955 as an advisor to the University of Arizona Board of Regents and to the State Colleges of Arizona.

Alfred Atkinson died in Tucson, Arizona, on May 16, 1958.

== Legacy, other roles, and memberships ==
Atkinson was active in a number of professional organizations. He served as the chair of the executive committee of the 5th Dry Farming Congress, and was a vice president of the Corn Association and the Plains Cooperative Extension Association. Atkinson was a member of the Council of Presidents of the Association of State Universities and Land-Grant Colleges (now known as the Association of Public and Land-grant Universities), and served as its president from 1936 to 1937.

Atkinson also served on a number of nonprofessional capacities as well. He was Montana's representative on the Northwest Planning Board (a federal power and transportation infrastructure planning agency) in the 1930s, and served on the Arizona Interstate Water Commission from 1948 to 1955.

Atkinson was a Freemason, and a member of Phi Gamma Delta and Alpha Zeta. He was president of the Northern Pure Seed Company from 1906 to 1913, and consulted on farm crops with the Anaconda Copper Company.

== Personal life ==
Atkinson married Barbara Miller of Whitby, Montana, on June 13, 1906. They had no children.

== Bibliography ==
- Cattell, J. McKeen and Brimhall, Dean R., eds. American Men of Science: A Biographical Directory. 3d ed. Garrison, N.Y.: The Science Press, 1921.
- Malone, Michael P.; Roeder, Richard B.; and Lang, William L. Montana: A History of Two Centuries. Seattle: University of Washington Press, 1991.
- The National Cyclopaedia of American Biography. Vol. 4. New York: James T. White & Co., 1943.
- Ohles, John F. Biographical Dictionary of American Educators. Westport, Conn.: Greenwood Press, 1978.
- Who's Who in American Education. Hattiesburg, Miss.: Who's Who in American Education, 1936.
