= A. L. Strand =

American entomologist (1894–1980)

5th President of Montana State University
- In office July 12, 1937 – October 14, 1942
- Preceded by: Alfred Atkinson
- Succeeded by: Roland Renne

10th President of Oregon State University
- In office October 15, 1942 – 1961
- Preceded by: Frank Llewellyn Ballard
- Succeeded by: James Herbert Jensen

Personal details
- Born: February 12, 1894 Victoria, Texas, United States
- Died: April 27, 1980 (aged 86) Corvallis, Oregon, United States
- Spouse: Mollie Josephine Allen Strand
- Children: James, Patsy, Roy
- Education: Montana State University; University of Minnesota
- Profession: Professor of Entomology

August Leroy Strand (February 12, 1894 – April 27, 1980) was an American entomologist who served as President of Montana State University from 1937 to 1942, and as President of Oregon State University from 1942 to 1961. He has also served as a professor of entomology, being the head of the Department of Entomology at Montana State College.

== Life and career ==
Strand was born on February 12, 1894, in Victoria, Texas, to August M. and Christina (Dohl) Strand. His father was born in Sweden about 1855, and his mother in Sweden about 1861. They emigrated to the United States, first taking up residence in Missouri, where their first three children were born: Rose L. in 1885, Ettie C. in 1888, and May F. in 1887. The family moved to Victoria, Texas, where August was born in 1894. His brother Victor D. was born there in 1896. The Strands then moved to Helena, Montana, in 1901 where the last child, Helen E., was born in 1905. Strand graduated from Helena High School in 1913.

Strand enrolled at what was the known as Montana State College (now Montana State University) and earned a Bachelor of Science degree in entomology in 1917. From 1917 to 1919, he served in the United States Navy as an aviator with the rank of ensign. From 1919 to 1923, he served as Assistant State Entomologist for the state of Montana. He left in 1924 to become Assistant Extension Entomologist at Pennsylvania State College (now Pennsylvania State University) in State College, Pennsylvania. (The Cooperative Extension System is a program of the U.S. federal government administered by land-grant universities and colleges to educate farmers and ranchers about modern agricultural practices.) He enrolled in the doctoral program at the University of Minnesota in 1924, receiving his Master of Science in entomology in 1925 and his Ph.D. in entomology (with a concentration in agricultural biochemistry) in June 1928.

Strand served as a teaching assistant at the University of Minnesota from 1924 to 1928. He was appointed an assistant professor in 1928, and served until 1931.

=== Montana State College ===
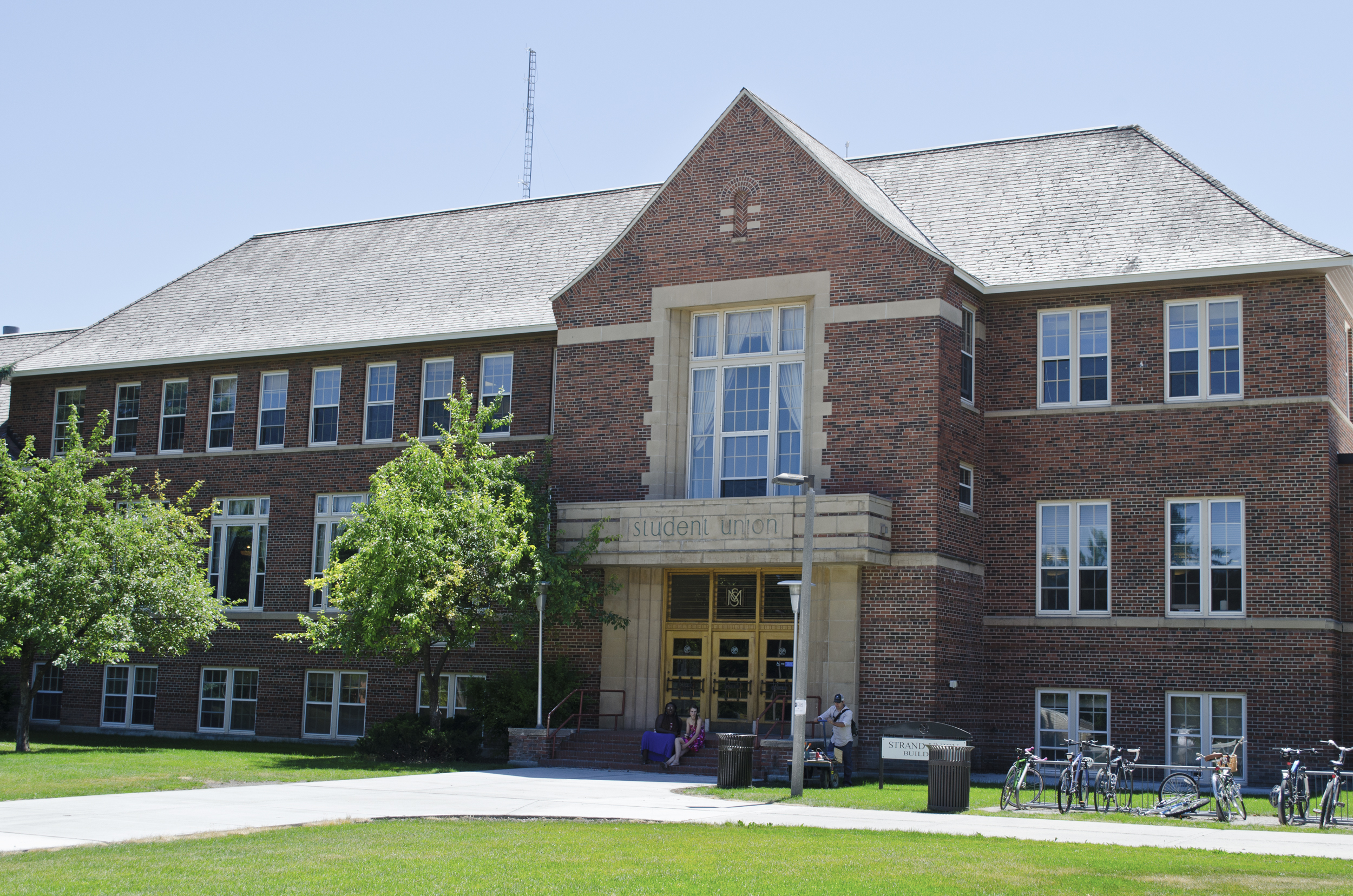
Original building

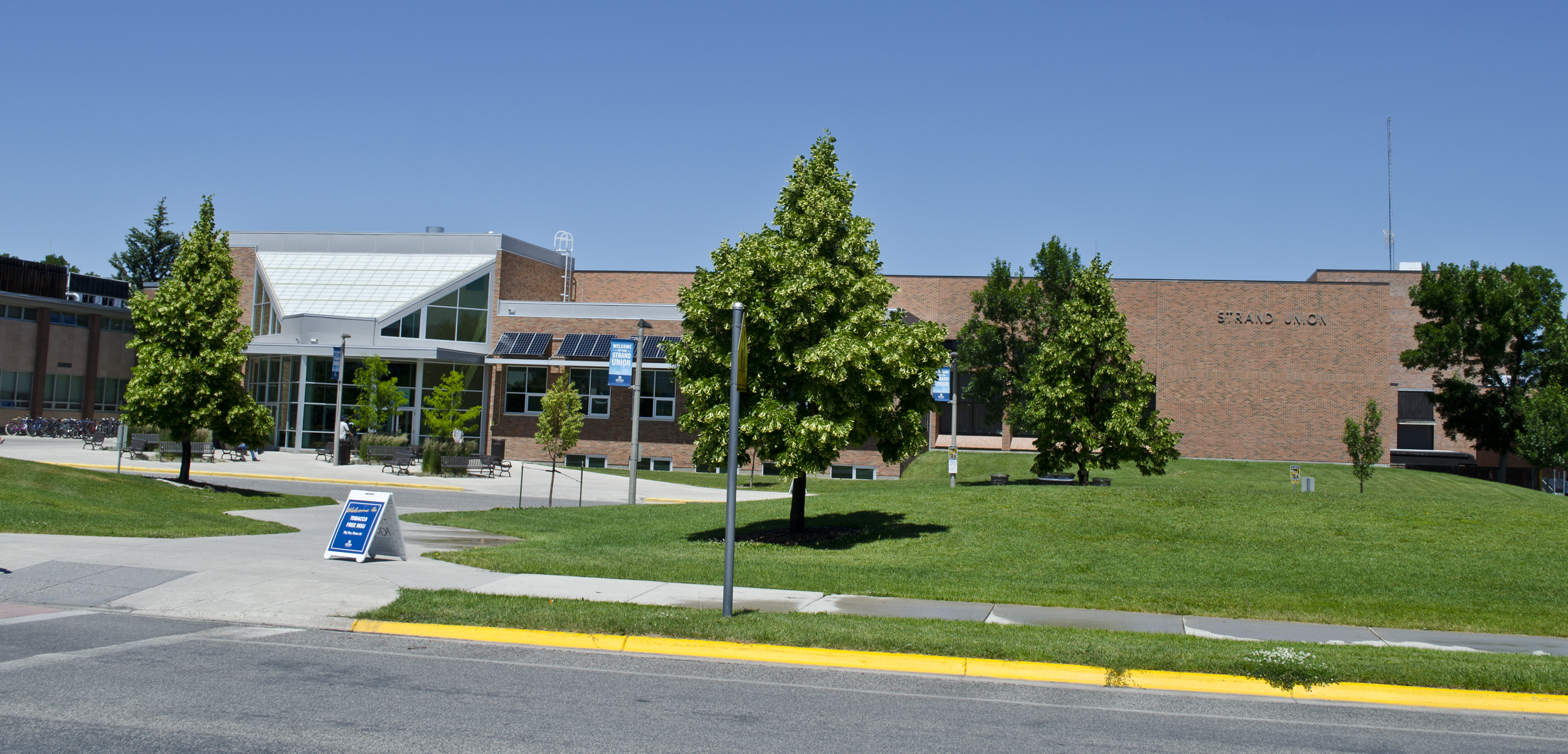
1970s addition and renaming of the entire building.

The student union building at Montana State University was renamed Strand Union Building in 1972

Strand received an appointment as assistant professor of entomology at Montana State College in 1931. He was later promoted to professor and head of the Department of Entomology.

President Alfred Atkinson resigned in 1937 to become president of the University of Arizona. Strand, who had discovered ways of controlling the devastating locust invasions in Montana, was named the new president. He was the first graduate of the college to become its president. On July 6, 1937, Strand was elected President of Montana State College (MSC) by the school's board of regents. Dr. Atkinson called him one of the nation's top three entomologists at the time of his election.

An upsurge in campus drinking occurred after the end of Prohibition, and in 1940 the Student Union Building (now Strand Union Building) was built to provide students with a gathering spot on campus that (it was hoped) would keep them away from the saloons downtown.

President Strand resigned his office in 1942 to accept the presidency of Oregon State University. (He remained there for 19 years, turning Oregon State into a world-class research and teaching institution.) With Montana still not yet having emerged from the Great Depression, the college struggled to find a new president. Engineering professor William Cobleigh took over as Acting President until from 1942 to 1943 while a replacement for Strand was found. During Cobleigh's year as president, college enrollment plunged as young men entered the armed forces or left to work in war industry plants on the West Coast. Nonetheless, federal funding increased as the United States Department of War sought rapid, significant increases in the number of chemical, engineering, and physics graduates to feed the war effort.

=== Oregon State College ===
Strand was elected President of Oregon State College on August 6, 1942. His term of service began on October 15.

Strand inherited a college somewhat adrift. President George W. Peavy had retired in July 1940, and was replaced by Dr. Frank Llewellyn Ballard (vice president overseeing the cooperative extension service). Ballard fell ill and turned over his duties to an administrative council. But as it became clear that his illness was going to be a lengthy one followed by an extensive convalescence, Ballard resigned in 1941. Dr. Francois A. Gilfillan, Dean of Science, was named interim president. Gilfillan remained involved in research in synthetic rubber, and the need for rubber for the war drew his attention more and more.

After a nationwide search, the state commissioners of higher education awarded the presidency to Strand. Strand was an autocratic leader asked for little input from his administrators or the student body, little appreciated advice, and reacted defensively when challenged. Nonetheless, his governance style fit well with most of the period in which he served as president. Enrollment at OSC fell by half during his first year in office as young men enlisted or were drafted into the armed forces. OSC's key location near the West Coast and relative safety inland from widely anticipated Imperial Japanese attack made it an ideal location for military research and training, and the United States Army seized many campus buildings for the duration of the national emergency.

Once the war ended, however, Strand rapidly rebuilt Oregon State. Between 1945 and 1960, enrollment doubled. A firm believer in scientific research, Strand pushed faculty at OSC to engage in research and for faculty and the university to apply for federal research grant funding. To support this effort, he created the Science Research Institute to receive this funding, and added new research laboratories to study transportation and water resources. Much of Strand's focus was on the School of Science, which became the largest school at Oregon State. The School of Science rapidly expanded its curriculum and course offerings, and added departments of natural resources, oceanography, and statistics. His effort was largely successful, as Oregon State became one of the most active research universities in the nation. Strand won legislative approval to expand the School of Education, School of Pharmacy, and School of Science; build a new School of Business and Technology and a new School of Humanities and Social Sciences; and designate the school as a university and rename it Oregon State University. He also created the university's first undergraduate honors program, and constructed a startling 25 new buildings on campus. Among these was the $2.38 million Valley Library and the $5 million engineering-physics building. Also constructed during his tenure was Gill Coliseum and Parker Stadium.

A major scandal rocked Oregon State University in 1949. In February, Strand summarily fired untenured professor of chemistry Ralph Spitzer and untenured professor of economics L. R. LaVallee. Neither was given a reason for their dismissal, but Strand believed that both individuals were communists and working with the Soviet Union to undermine not only Oregon State but the United States. (In particular, Strand was outraged that Spitzer supported the environmentally acquired genetic inheritance theories of Soviet scientist Trofim Lysenko.) By the end of February, Strand found himself the target of several scathing attacks, although most of the public, faculty, and student body supported him. Among those critical of the terminations were Sidney Hook and Linus Pauling. Strand's replies to these critics (and he responded to a great many of them) were often rude, condescending, and offensive. Although the "Spitzer affair" quieted down after a year or two, Pauling refused all invitations to visit Oregon State for decades. Shortly after the incident ended, writer Bernard Malamud visited the campus to conduct research for a novel about the "Spitzer affair". He used this research for his 1961 novel A New Life.

=== Death ===
A.L. Strand died April 27, 1980, in a nursing home in Corvallis, Oregon, after an extended illness.

== Memberships and honors ==
Strand served on the Council of Presidents of the American Association of State Universities and Land-Grant Colleges (now known as the Association of Public and Land-grant Universities), and served for a time as the council's chairman. He also served for a time on the board of directors of the Foundation for American Agriculture.

In 1957, Montana State College honored Strand with a Doctor of Laws honorary degree. He was also an active member of the Rotary Club, and president of the Bozeman Rotary in 1942. He was also a member of the American Association for the Advancement of Science and Sigma Xi.

The Student Union Building at Montana State University was named for Strand in 1972.

== Personal life ==
Strand married Mollie Josephine Allen on July 2, 1919. She was the daughter of C.J. and Sarah (Connell) Allen, and born in Galway, Irish Free State, on September 14, 1894. The couple had three children: James A., born in 1924; Patsy M., born in 1926; and Roy D., born in 1932.

== Bibliography ==
- Strand, August Leroy. The Relation Between the Permeability of Insect Respiratory Membranes and the Toxicity of Contact Insecticides. Minneapolis: University of Minnesota, 1928.
