= Montana State University =

Public research university in Bozeman, Montana, U.S.

- Former names: Agricultural College of the State of Montana (1893–1913); Montana College of Agriculture and Mechanic Arts (1913–1965)
- Motto: "Mountains & Minds"
- Type: Public land-grant research university
- Established: 8 November 1893; 133 years ago
- Parent institution: Montana University System - Montana State University System
- Accreditation: NWCCU
- Academic affiliations: Space-grant
- Endowment: $319.6 million (2025)
- President: Brock Tessman
- Provost: Elizabeth Burroughs
- Faculty: 1,370 (fall 2023)
- Administrative staff: 2,127 (fall 2023)
- Students: 17,165 (fall 2025)
- Undergraduates: 15,142 (fall 2025)
- Postgraduates: 2,023 (fall 2025)
- Location: Bozeman, Montana, United States; 45°40′06″N 111°03′00″W
- Campus: 1,170 acres (470 ha); Small City
- Newspaper: The MSU Exponent
- Colors: Blue and gold
- Nickname: Bobcats
- Sporting affiliations: NCAA Division I FCS – Big Sky; RMISA; NIRA
- Mascot: Champ
- Website: www.montana.edu

Montana State University (MSU) is a public land-grant research university in Bozeman, Montana, United States. It enrolls more students than any other college or university in the state. MSU offers baccalaureate degrees in 60 fields, master's degrees in 68, and doctoral degrees in 35 through its nine colleges. More than 16,700 students attended MSU in fall 2019, taught by 796 full-time and 547 part-time faculty. In the Carnegie Classification, MSU is placed among "R1: Doctoral Universities – Very high research activity", one of only two universities in Montana to receive this distinction with a "very high undergraduate" enrollment profile. The university had research expenditures of $257.9 million in 2024.

Located on the south side of Bozeman, the university's 1,170-acre (470 ha) campus is the largest in the state. The university's main campus in Bozeman is home to KUSM television, KGLT radio, and the Museum of the Rockies. MSU provides outreach services to citizens and communities statewide through its agricultural experiment station and 60 county and reservation extension offices. The elevation of the campus is 4,900 feet (1,500 m) above mean sea level.

== History ==
=== Establishment of the college ===
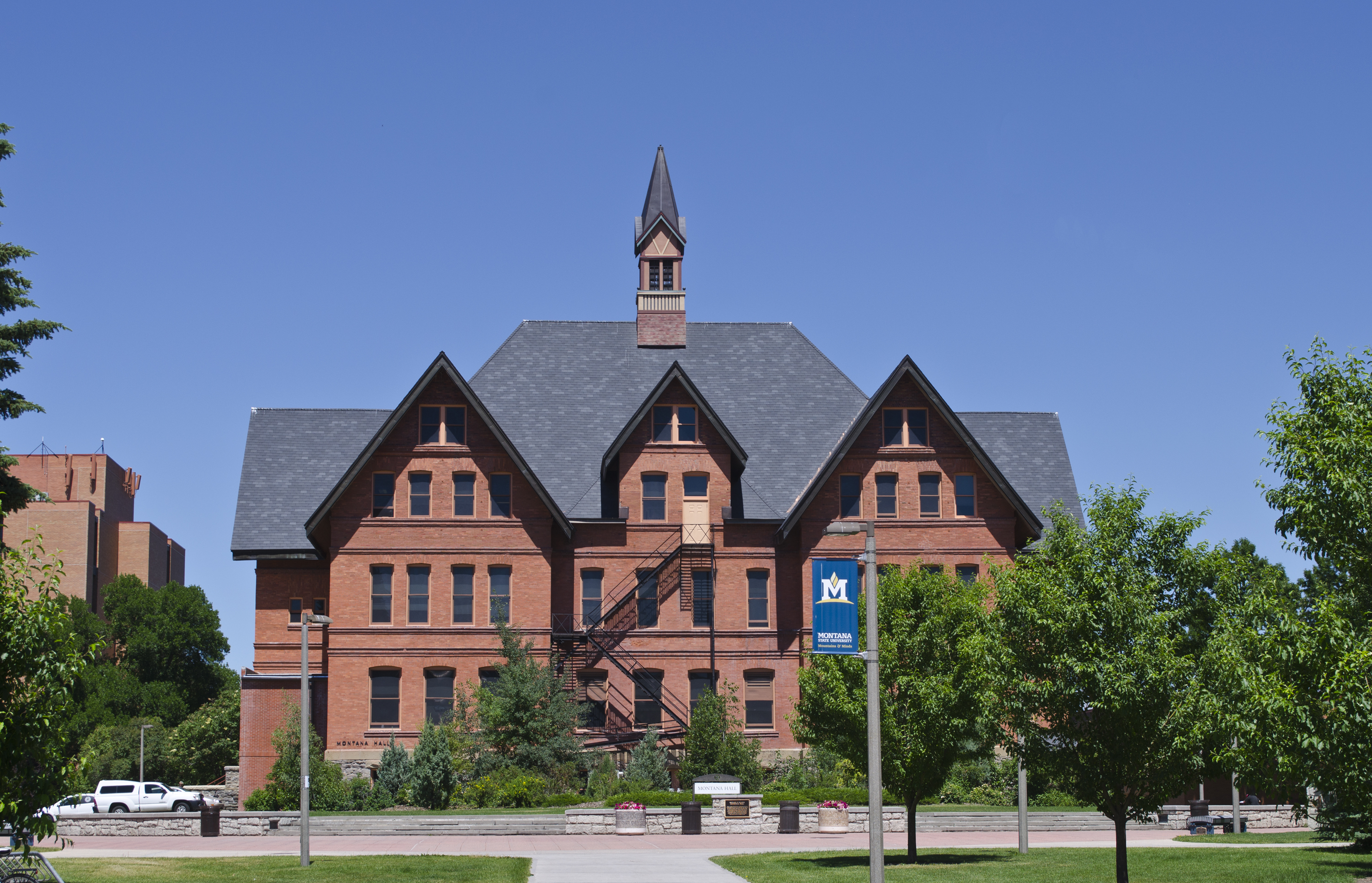
Montana Hall, the second building constructed on campus: The Office of the President is located here.

Montana became a state on 8 November 1889. Several cities competed intensely to be the state capital, Bozeman among them. In time, Helena was named the state capital. As a consolation, the state legislature put the state's land-grant college in Bozeman. Gallatin County donated half of its 160-acre poor farm for the campus, and money for an additional 40 acres, which had been planned to hold a state capital, was raised by the community, including a $1,500 donation from rancher and businessman Nelson Story, Sr. This land, as well as additional property and monetary contributions, was turned over to the state for the new college.

MSU was founded in 1893 as the Agricultural College of the State of Montana. It opened on 16 February with five male and three female students. The first classes were held in rooms in the county high school, and later that year in the shuttered Bozeman Academy (a private preparatory school). The first students were from Bozeman Academy and were forced to transfer to the college. Only two faculty existed on opening day: Luther Foster, a horticulturist from South Dakota who was also acting president, and Homer G. Phelps, who taught business. Within weeks, they were joined by S. M. Emery (who ran the agricultural experiment station) and Benjamin F. Maiden (an English teacher from the former Bozeman Academy). Augustus M. Ryon, a coal mine owner, was named the college's first president on 17 April 1893. He immediately clashed with the board of trustees and faculty. The trustees wanted the college to focus on agriculture, but Ryon pointed out that few of its students intended to go back to farming. The rapidly expanding faculty wanted to establish a remedial education program to assist unprepared undergraduates (Montana's elementary and secondary public education system was in dire shape at the time), but Ryon refused. The Story land was donated to the college in 1894, but Ryon was forced out in 1895 and replaced by James R. Reid, a Presbyterian minister who had been president of the Montana College at Deer Lodge since 1890.

The college grew quickly under Reid, who provided 10 years of stability and harmony. The student body grew so fast that college took over the high school building completely. A vacant store on Main Street was rented for additional classroom space. The Agricultural Experiment Station (now known as Taylor Hall) and the Main Building (now Montana Hall) were constructed in 1896, and the agricultural building was the first to open. Both structures were occupied in 1898. The football team was established in 1897, and the college graduated its first four students that same year. The curriculum expanded into civil and electrical engineering in 1898.

=== Expansion and growth under Hamilton and Atkinson ===
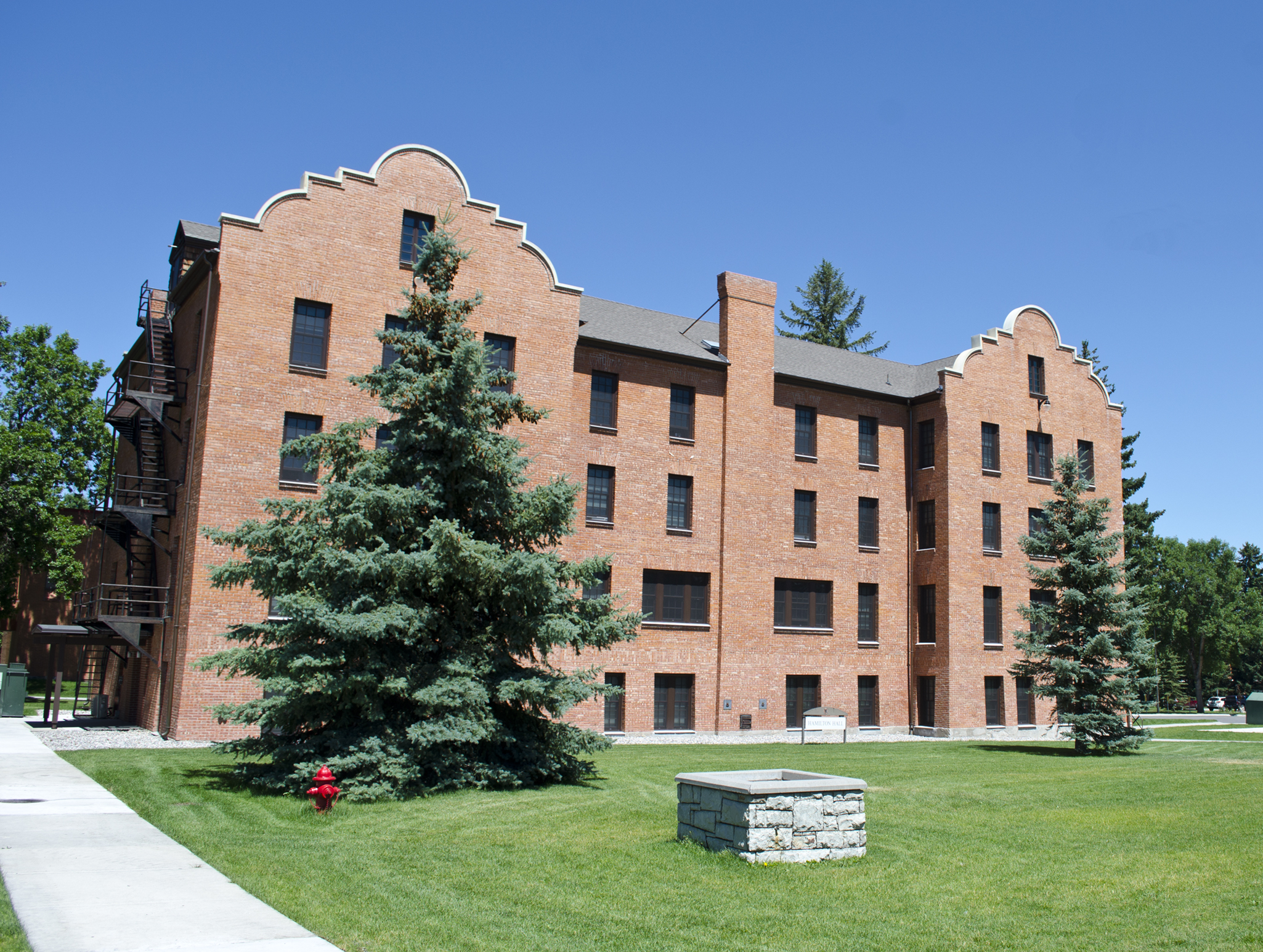
Mission Revival-style Hamilton Hall, the first campus dormitory, was constructed in 1910.

Reid resigned for health reasons in 1905 and was succeeded by James M. Hamilton, an economist. Determined to make the college into a school of technology, he rapidly expanded the curriculum areas such as biology, chemistry, engineering, geology, and physics. Hamilton also devised the university motto, "Education for Efficiency", which the college continued to use until the 1990s. Further marking this change in direction, the school was officially renamed the Montana College of Agriculture and Mechanic Arts in 1913 (although that name was in widespread use as early as 1894). The college's first great rapid expansion of physical plants also began under Hamilton. Constructed during this time were Linfield Hall (1908), Hamilton Hall (1910), and Traphagen Hall (1919). The giant whitewashed "M" on the side of Mount Baldy in the foothills of the Bridger Range was first built in 1916, and in 1917 ROTC came to campus for the first time.

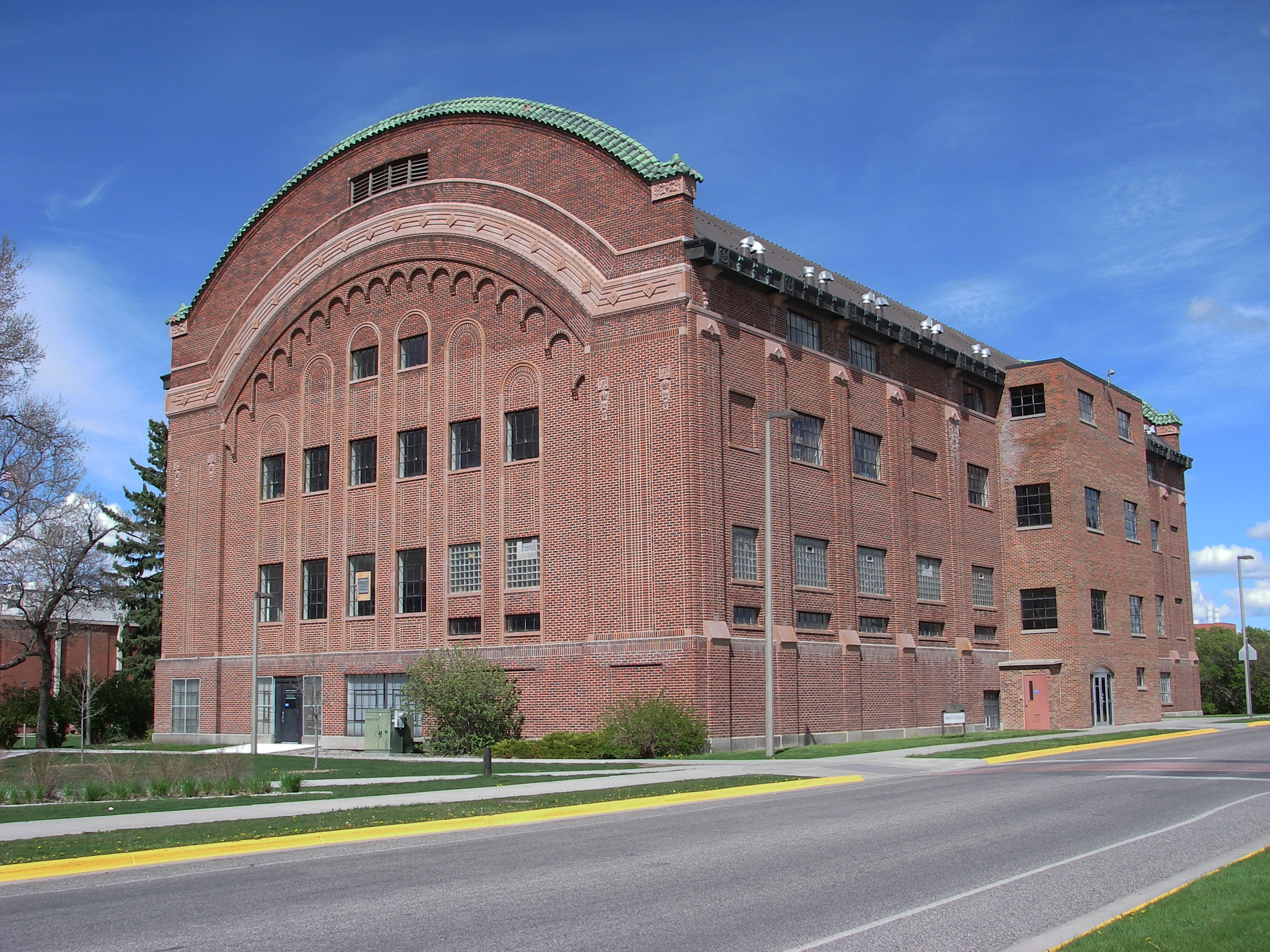
Iconic barrel vaulted Romney Gym, home of the 1928 national champion Bobcat basketball team, was constructed in 1922.

Hamilton resigned in 1919 to become Dean of Men, and his successor was agricultural expert Alfred Atkinson. Atkinson's tenure lasted 17 years (1920 to 1937). A firm believer in Hamilton's vision for the school, Atkinson worked hard to continue the rapid expansion of the campus. The iconic, barrel-vaulted Gymnasium Building (now Romney Hall) was built in 1922, replacing a dilapidated "drill hall" and giving the school's men's basketball team its first home court. The Heating Plant, Lewis Hall, and Roberts Hall followed in 1923. By the 1920s, the school was commonly referred to as Montana State College (MSC). Herrick Hall followed in 1926. The college was justifiably proud of its academic accomplishments, but its sports teams entered a golden age as well. In 1922, Atkinson hired George Ott Romney and Schubert Dyche as co-head coaches of the football and men's basketball teams. Between 1922 and 1928 (the year he departed Montana for Brigham Young University), Romney's football teams compiled a 28–20–1 record. This included the 1924 season in which his team went undefeated until the final game of the year. As a co-head basketball coach, Romney's teams compiled a 144–31 record and invented the fast break. After Romney left, Schubert Dyche coached the "Golden Bobcats" team of 1928, which had a 36–2 record and won the national championship. In his seven years as a basketball coach, Dyche's teams compiled a 110–93 record (this included the dismal 1932–33 and 1933–34 seasons), but won their conference championship twice. In 1930, the college built Gatton Field, a football field on what is now the site of the Marga Hosaeus Fitness Center. In one of President Atkinson's last accomplishments, the Dormitory Quadrangle (now Atkinson Quadrangle) was built.

The first three decades of the 20th century were rowdy ones on the college campus. Bozeman had a large red-light district by 1900, alcohol was plentiful and cheap, and there was little in the way of organized entertainment such as theaters to occupy the student body. President Reid spent much of his presidency cracking down on dancing, drinking, gambling, and prostitution by students. President Hamilton sought to improve the atmosphere for women by building Hamilton Hall, which was not only the first on-campus housing for students but also the first all-women's housing on campus. Access by men to Hamilton Hall was strictly limited to young teenage boys (who acted as servants); adult males were permitted only in the first-floor lounge, and only on Sundays. Atkinson Quadrangle was built on the location of the College Inn, also known as the "Bobcat Lair," a popular student drinking and dancing hangout.

=== Depression and World War II ===
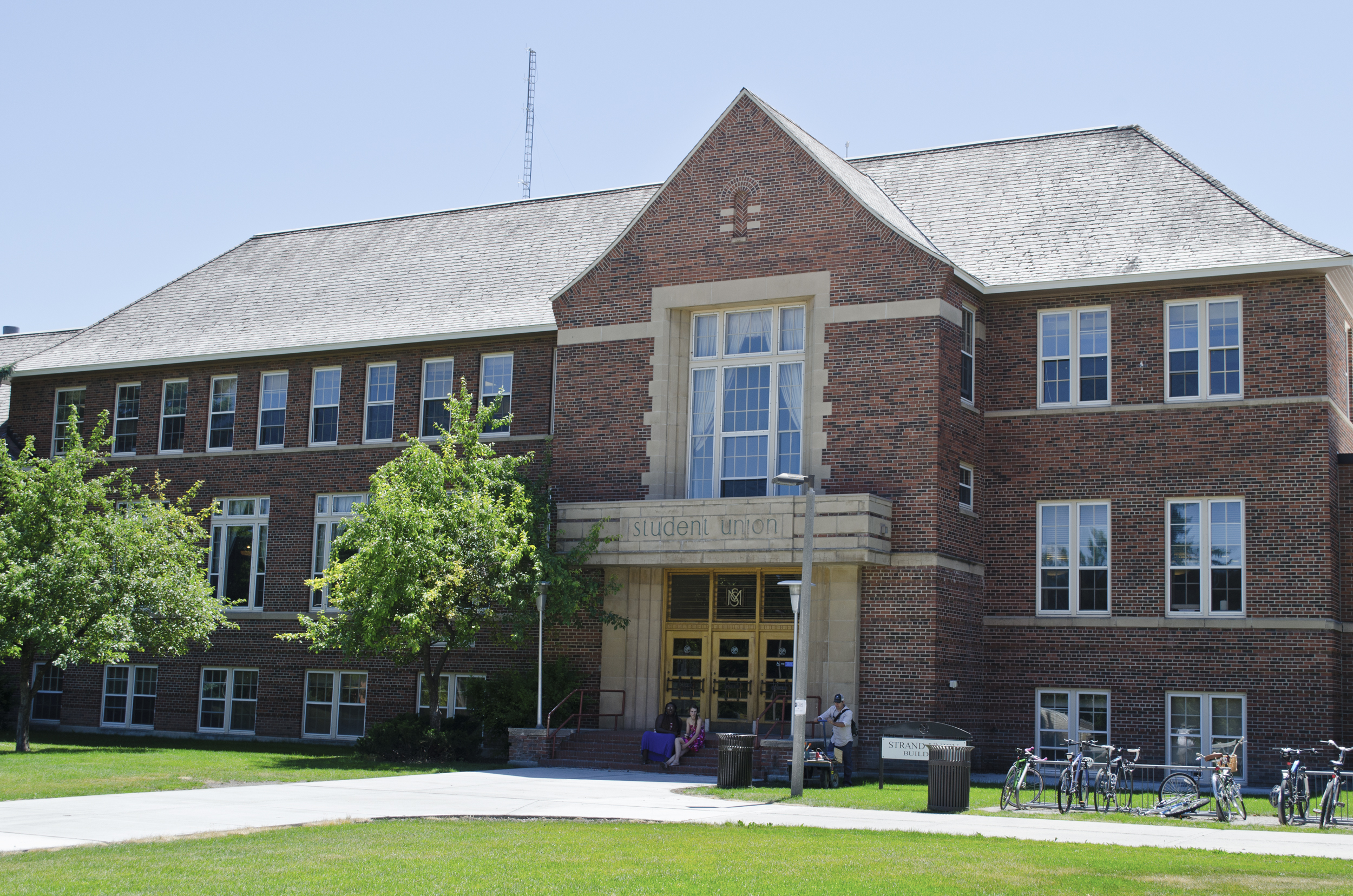
The Student Union Building (now Strand Union Building), which opened in 1940.

The college suffered greatly during the Great Depression. The price of agricultural products (Montana's economic mainstay) soared during World War I, as European and Russian farms were devastated by military campaigns, in which American and European armies demanded food. For a few years after the war, these prices remained high. But as European agriculture began to improve, an agricultural depression swamped the United States beginning in about 1923. State tax revenues plunged, and fewer buildings were constructed on campus after 1923.

=== The Renne years ===
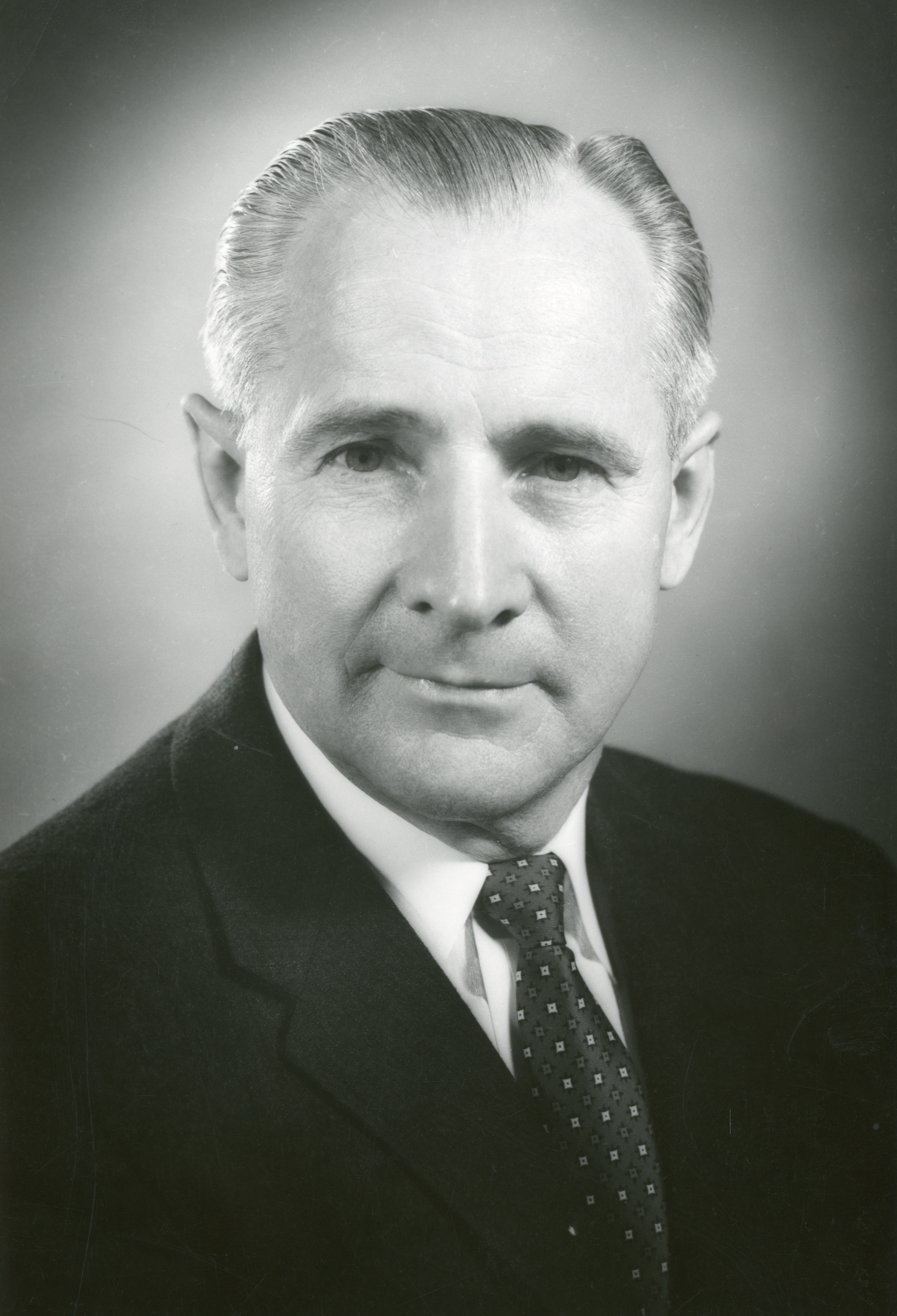
Roland Renne, president of MSU from 1943 to 1964.

In 1943, the state board of higher education appointed MSC economist Roland "Rollie" Renne to be the new acting president of the college; he was named the permanent president on 1 July 1944 and served until 1964.

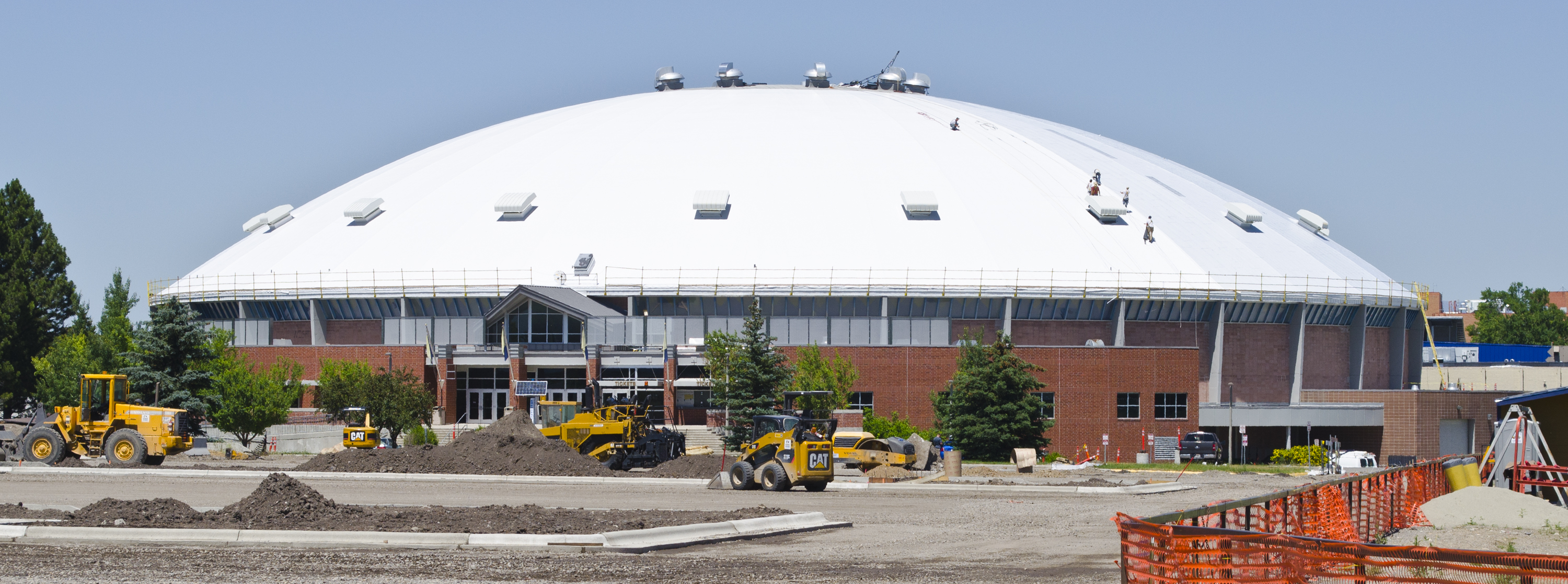
Brick Breeden Fieldhouse and Worthington Arena, constructed in 1958.

=== University status and campus conservatism ===
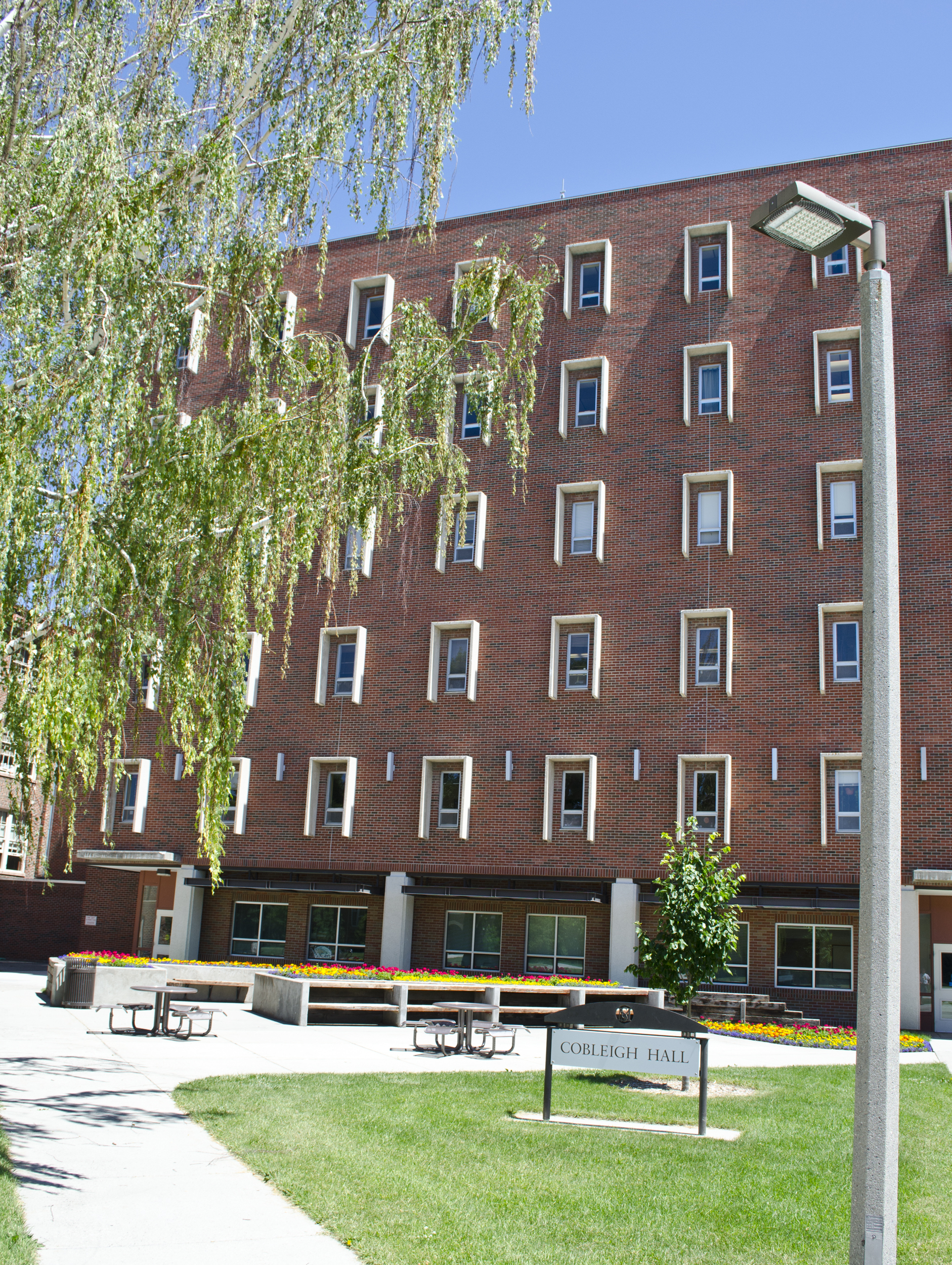
Cobleigh Hall, completed in 1970 as an addition to Roberts Hall, houses several departments in the College of Engineering.

In February 1964, Leon H. Johnson was appointed president of MSC. A research chemist who joined the college in 1943, he had most recently been the executive director of the school's Endowed and Research Foundation (at the time, MSC's largest research unit) and Dean of the Graduate Division. Deeply committed to the college's research function, he pushed for MSC to be named a university — a change Renne had since the early 1950s, and which the Montana state legislature approved on 1 July 1965. At that time, the school received its new name, Montana State University (MSU). Bachelor's degree programs in economics, English, history, music, political science, and other disciplines were quickly established, as was the first university honors program. Johnson was a devoted admirer of the arts, and MSU's art and music programs blossomed. Johnson quickly worked to end the acrimonious relationship with the University of Montana, and the two schools began to present a united front to the state legislature.

In 1966, Johnson altered and enlarged the university's administrative structure to help cope with increasing enrollment and increasing campus complexity. These changes included creating a 12-member executive council to advise him. The council included newly created vice presidents — overseeing areas such as academic affairs, administration, finance, and research.

Johnson was deeply conservative—fiscally, socially, and politically. He was deeply committed to continuing Renne's educational plan but declined to spend money on new buildings (preferring to consolidate and renovate rather than expand). He also continued Renne's policies largely barring from campus speakers who were not clearly in the political mainstream. Johnson's policies were largely supported by the student body and the taxpaying public. MSU practiced a policy known as in loco parentis, in which it acted as a "parent" of the "children" studying there. To that end, Johnson instituted dress codes, required adult chaperones at dances, banned alcohol, and instituted mandatory military training for freshmen and sophomores. Many U.S. college campuses were engulfed by student radicalism, but MSU's student body was as conservative as Johnson and accepted these restrictions. For many years, the biggest issues on campus were ending Saturday morning classes and building student parking lots.

There were some campus protests. The first protest against the Vietnam War occurred in 1966 (drawing about 100 students), two underground student newspapers briefly appeared, and some students organized clubs to debate issues. There were minor faculty and student protests when Johnson attempted to prevent English professor James Myers from assigning students James Baldwin's novel Another Country, and in the summer of 1968 a few faculty organized a symposium on the war. When about 150 students rallied in front of Montana Hall in 1969 to ask for co-ed and "open visitation" dorms (e.g., to allow men into women's dorm rooms, and vice versa), Johnson threatened to call out the city police.

MSU's Bobcat Stadium saw its genesis during the Johnson years. Growing student unrest over the football team's use of decrepit Gatton Field (while the basketball team used modern Brick Breeden Fieldhouse) led Johnson in April 1968 to propose a 16,000-seat stadium funded by student fees. The proposal failed in December, after students argued that the university should concurrently build a new fitness center.

Johnson died of a heart attack on 18 June 1969. He had suffered a heart attack in October 1968 and then underwent surgery out of state in April 1969.

William Johnstone, a professor of education and Vice President for Administration at MSU, took over as Acting President. He was the first and (as of 2013) only Montanan to become president of MSU. Johnstone pledged to build the fitness center first, and in December 1969 the student body approved the finance plan for the new football stadium. On 2 April 1970, about 250 students engaged in a sit-in in Montana Hall to protest Myers's termination, but it ended peacefully a day later. Myers was terminated, and another eight faculty resigned in protest. But during his year in office, the university completed Cobleigh Hall (ironically named for the last individual to be named acting president).

=== Tough fiscal times of the 1970s ===
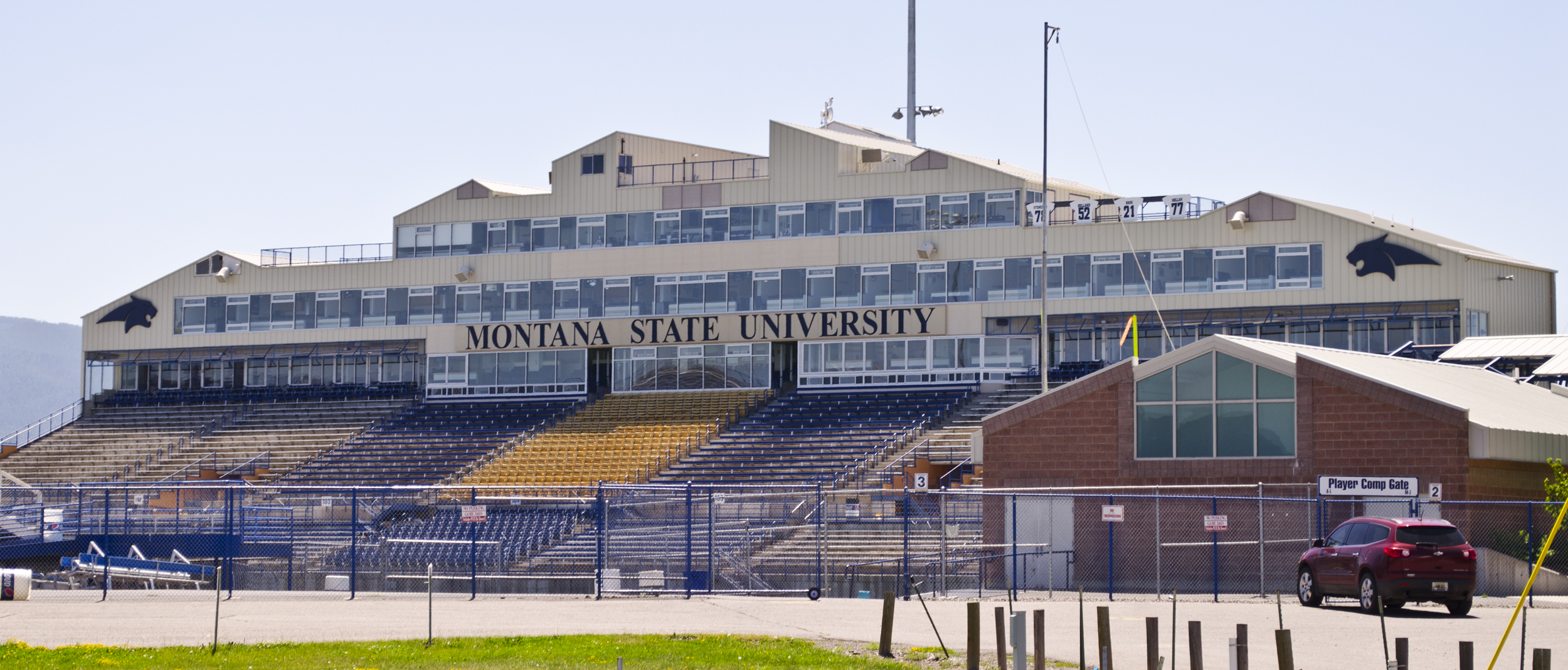
Bobcat Stadium, shown here in 2013, opened in 1973 and was originally known as Reno H. Sales Stadium. It received its current name in 1998.

Carl W. McIntosh was named MSU's eighth president in June 1970. Previously the president of 28,000-student California State University, Long Beach, McIntosh brought a consultative and deliberate style of decision-making to the university. He faced a poor fiscal climate: The state was entering a decade-long depression brought about by a steep drop in commodity prices, the state's higher education system had grown too large and unwieldy, and Governor Thomas L. Judge had established a blue-ribbon committee to close several of the state's colleges. In 1974, women faculty at MSU sued, alleging gender discrimination. They won their suit in 1976, leading to a $400,000 damages award, a back-pay award, and extensive promotions (which also increased salaries). To accommodate these fiscal realities, McIntosh ordered several doctoral and master's degree programs terminated, and all advanced degree programs in the social sciences and liberal arts canceled.

But McIntosh also scored several successes. In 1972, he persuaded the legislature to allow MSU to participate in the Washington, Wyoming, Alaska, Montana, and Idaho (WWAMI) medical education program, which allowed 20 (now 30) Montana citizens per year to begin medical school at MSU before completing studies at the University of Washington. The College of nursing (Sherrick Hall) was finished in 1973, and after three long years of construction, Reno H. Sales Stadium (now Bobcat Stadium and Martel Field) and the Marga Hosaeus Fitness Center both opened. In 1974, the long-planned Creative Arts Complex (Cheever Hall, Haynes Hall, and Howard Hall) was also completed. Unfortunately, major increases in inflation led to significant design changes. Instead of a 1,200-seat concert hall with superb acoustics, a cramped and aurally dead 260-seat auditorium was built. Finally, in 1976, the university completed the new medical science building, Leon Johnson Hall.

In 1976, the "hidden million" controversy ended McIntosh's tenure as president. In 1975, Montana's first Commissioner of Higher Education, Lawrence K. Pettit (a former MSU professor of political science) launched an investigation of several Montana colleges and universities. He was particularly interested in MSU, where McIntosh's laid-back governance style was widely considered to have hurt the university. In March 1976, Pettit announced he was confiscating $1 million in surplus student fees from MSU—money he said the university was trying to hide from state auditors and the legislature. The monies were the result of excessively high enrollment in the 1974–1975 school year and were intended to help see the university through the 1975–1976 school year (when the legislature would not meet, and thus could not provide the needed budgetary boost to handle the over-enrollment). Pettit all but accused MSU and McIntosh of fraud, and McIntosh refused to attack Pettit's statements as mischaracterizations and slander. The public outcry about the "hidden million" led the board of regents to request McIntosh's resignation on 30 June 1977, which he tendered. (Pettit resigned the next year, his combative attempt to turn the commissioner's office into a sort of chancellorship having failed.)

=== Resurgence and retrenchment under Tietz ===
William Tietz, MSU's ninth president, arrived in August 1977 just as economic conditions in the state were improving. With three of the four vice presidencies at the university open, Tietz imposed his stamp on the administration almost immediately. This included a strong emphasis on research, faculty development, better teaching, and diversity (particularly for Native Americans, the handicapped, and women). His aggressiveness, energy, and immediate re-budgeting of funds into faculty sabbaticals helped win over professors, who voted against unionization in 1978. Tietz's major goal, increasing research funding, was greatly helped by a 1981 decision of the legislature to refund indirect cost payments back to the university. This led to an immediate 15 percent recovery of federal funds, and in time private foundation funding rose significantly as well.

Only two buildings were constructed during Tietz's presidency—the Visual Communications Building in 1983 and the Plant Growth Center in 1987. Most of his focus as president was on raising salaries. A third building, the modern home of the Museum of the Rockies, opened in 1989. But this structure was paid for by bonds. Faculty salaries had declined 23 percent during the 1970s (due to wage freezes) and MSU was in the bottom 10 percent of salaries for faculty nationwide. Cooperative Extension Service salaries were dead last in the nation. The state legislature implemented a new salary funding formula that rectified many of these problems. Some university programs were also re-established, such as the honors program, and some new ones were formed, such as the Writing Center.

The state entered a severe economic downturn again in the mid-1980s. Budget cuts totaling nearly 10 percent, coupled with an enrollment shortfall, led to significant retrenchment. Tietz argued MSU should focus on its strongest programs. Thus, a wide array of programs were terminated: Membership in the Center for Research Libraries; sports like skiing, women's gymnastics, and wrestling; degree programs like engineering science, business education, and industrial arts; and the office of institutional research. Departments were merged and downsized, and Tietz proposed closing the School of Architecture. A battle broke out to save it, and Tietz backed off. He increasingly blamed Governor Ted Schwinden for failing to support higher education, and lashed out repeatedly against him when Schwinden publicly ridiculed MSU's new Tech Park (a 90-acre (360,000 m^{2}) project designed to function as a technology incubator). Although a second faculty unionization effort failed in 1989, Tietz resigned in March 1990, frustrated by the constant battles with an "old guard" resistant to turning MSU toward high technology.

=== Centennial and expansion ===
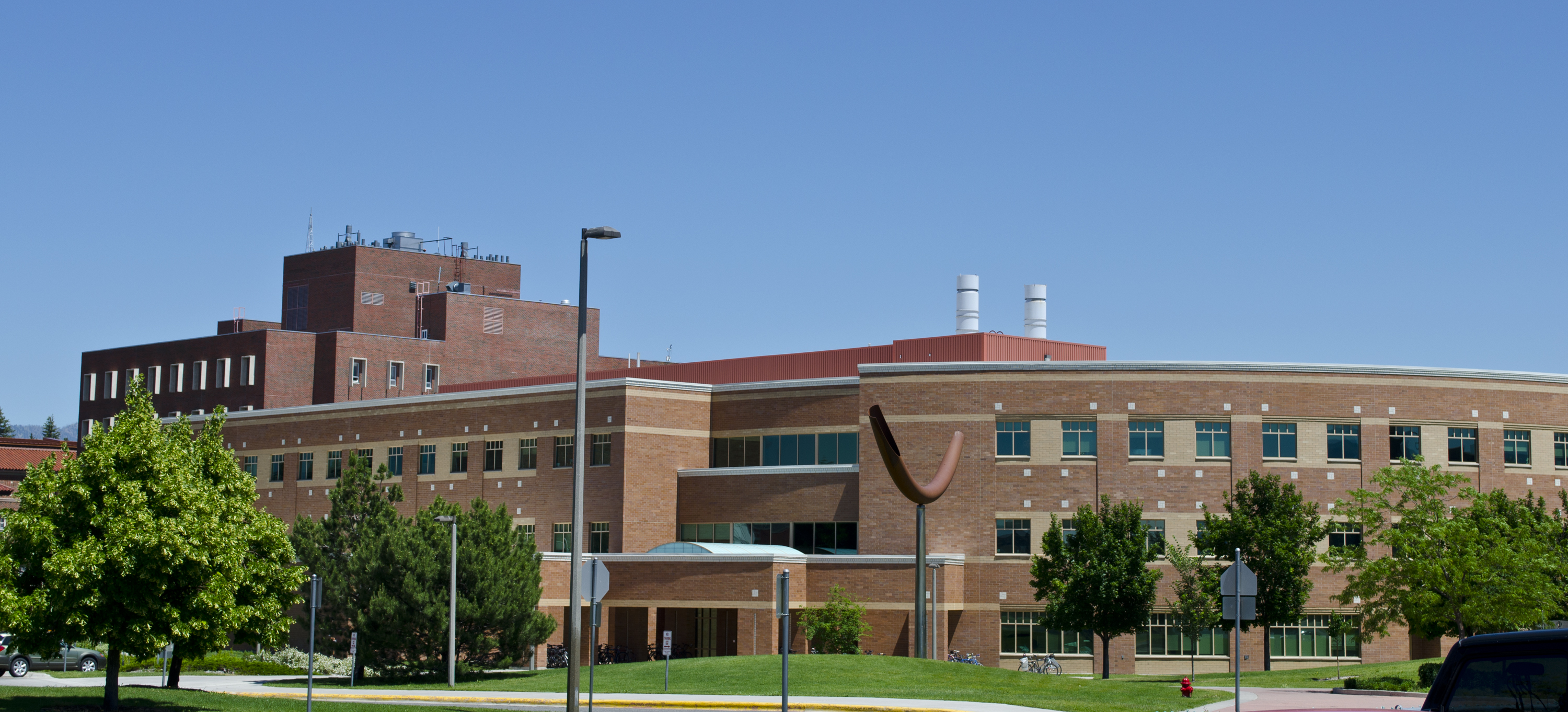
The Engineering and Physical Sciences Building, completed in 1999.

Michael P. Malone was named MSU's Acting President on 1 January 1991, and permanently appointed to the position in March 1991. He was MSU's 10th president. He had served as MSU's Dean of Graduate Studies from 1979 to 1988, and then three one-year temporary appointments as vice president for Academic Affairs while a fruitless national search occurred for a permanent replacement. As Dean of Graduate Studies, he'd been critical of what he perceived as the state's unwillingness to invest in high technology education.

Malone's governance style was democratic, friendly, and personal, making him personally popular with legislators and earning their respect. Nonetheless, he was criticized for focusing too much on how little money MSU had and for criticizing the legislature too much for not investing in higher education.

Malone was the first MSU president to preside over the Billings, Great Falls, and Havre campuses. On 1 July 1994, Montana restructured the Montana University System. Eastern Montana College in Billings, Montana Northern College in Havre, and the Vocational-Technical Center in Great Falls lost their independence and were made satellite campuses of Montana State University. Although Montana's seven tribal colleges remained independent (as they are sponsored by sovereign nations), the state required them to integrate their teaching, operations, and academic operations with both Montana State University and the University of Montana to continue to receive state funding.

MSU celebrated its centennial in 1993. A university history, In the People's Interest: A Centennial History of Montana State University, was published to celebrate the centennial, authored by three Montana State history professors—Jeffrey J. Safford, Pierce Mullen, and Robert Rydell.

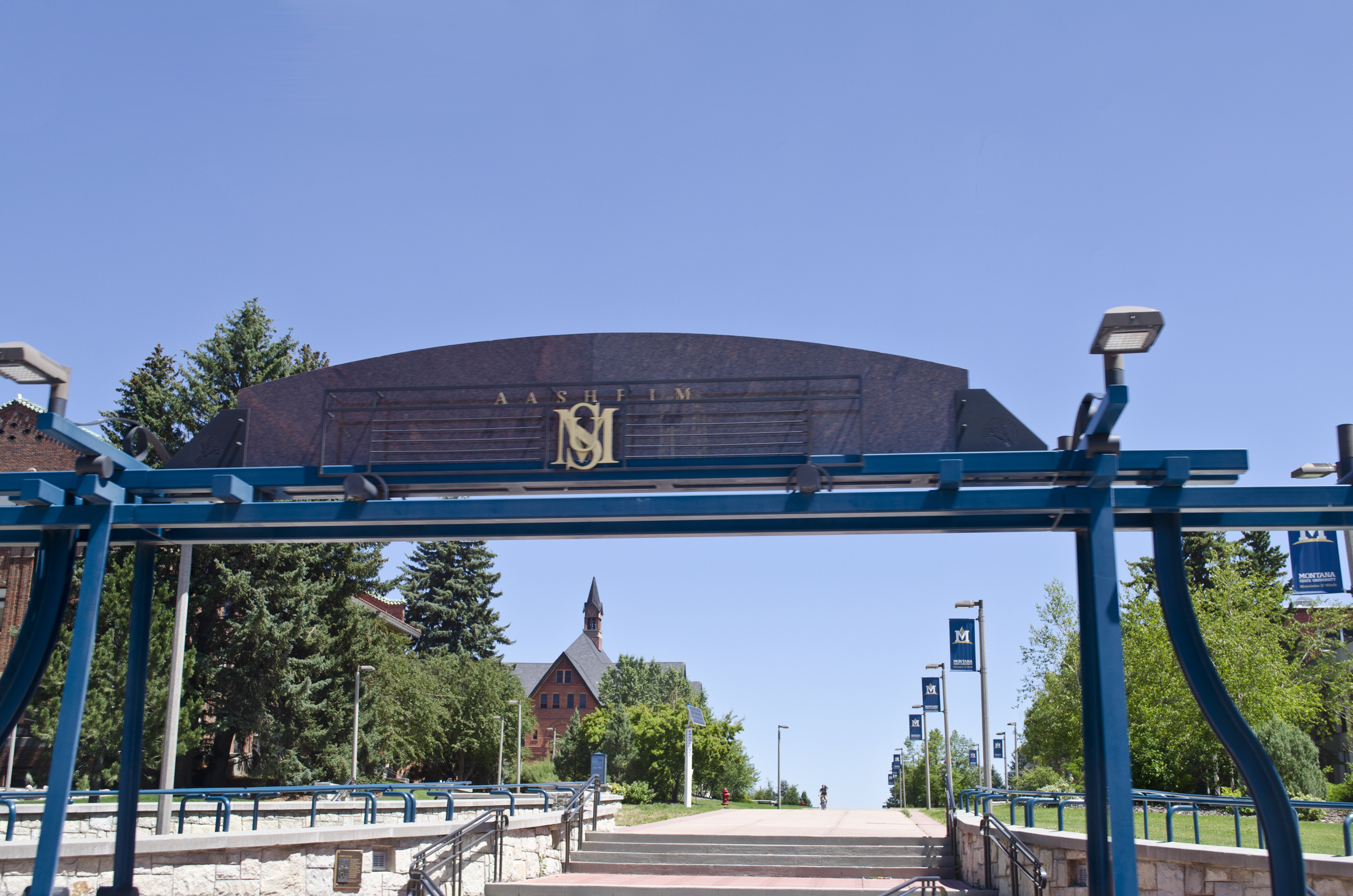
The western entrance to Centennial Mall, constructed to celebrate MSU's 100th anniversary in 1993.

During Malone's presidency, MSU witnessed "one of the greatest expansions in campus history", as a large number of new buildings were constructed. These included the $1 million Centennial Mall (1993), the $22 million Engineering and Physical Sciences Building (1997), the $10 million Bobcat Stadium renovation, the $13.5 million renovation of Brick Breeden Fieldhouse, the $12 million Agricultural Biosciences Building (1999), and the $7.5 million Renne Library renovation (1999). A strong sports fan, Malone's focus extended to sports personnel as well as sports facilities. In 1999, he fired Bobcats football head coach Cliff Hysell after eight losing seasons and hired Mike Kramer, the winning coach at Eastern Washington University. In October 1999, he fired MSU women's basketball head coach Tracey Sheehan and assistant coach Jeff Malby after an NCAA investigation revealed that the two coaches were overworking their team and causing injuries to student-athletes.

Like William Tietz before him, Malone also pushed hard for faculty and the university to seek and win federal funding for scientific research. Federal research funding grew from just $13 million in the late 1980s to more than $50 million in 1999. The undergraduate curriculum was revamped, enrollment hit a historic high of 11,746 students in 1999, and the Burns Telecommunications Center was established. Malone benefitted from a strong economy that eased many of the fiscal pressures Tietz faced. He expanded alumni fund-raising programs and pushed the MSU Foundation to redouble its fund-raising efforts. But the legislature was not forthcoming with salary increases. He weathered a strike by clerical and administrative support staff in 1992. But he was later criticized for initiating projects without having the money to complete them and then using the subsequent construction crisis to raise the funds to finish the projects. Tuition doubled during his time in office, angering students, and some faculty criticized his willingness to construct new buildings while declining to pay for teaching equipment.

The MSU community was shocked when Malone died of a heart attack on 21 December 1999, at Bozeman Yellowstone International Airport. He was the second MSU president to die in office, and the second to die of heart failure.

=== Twenty-first century stability ===
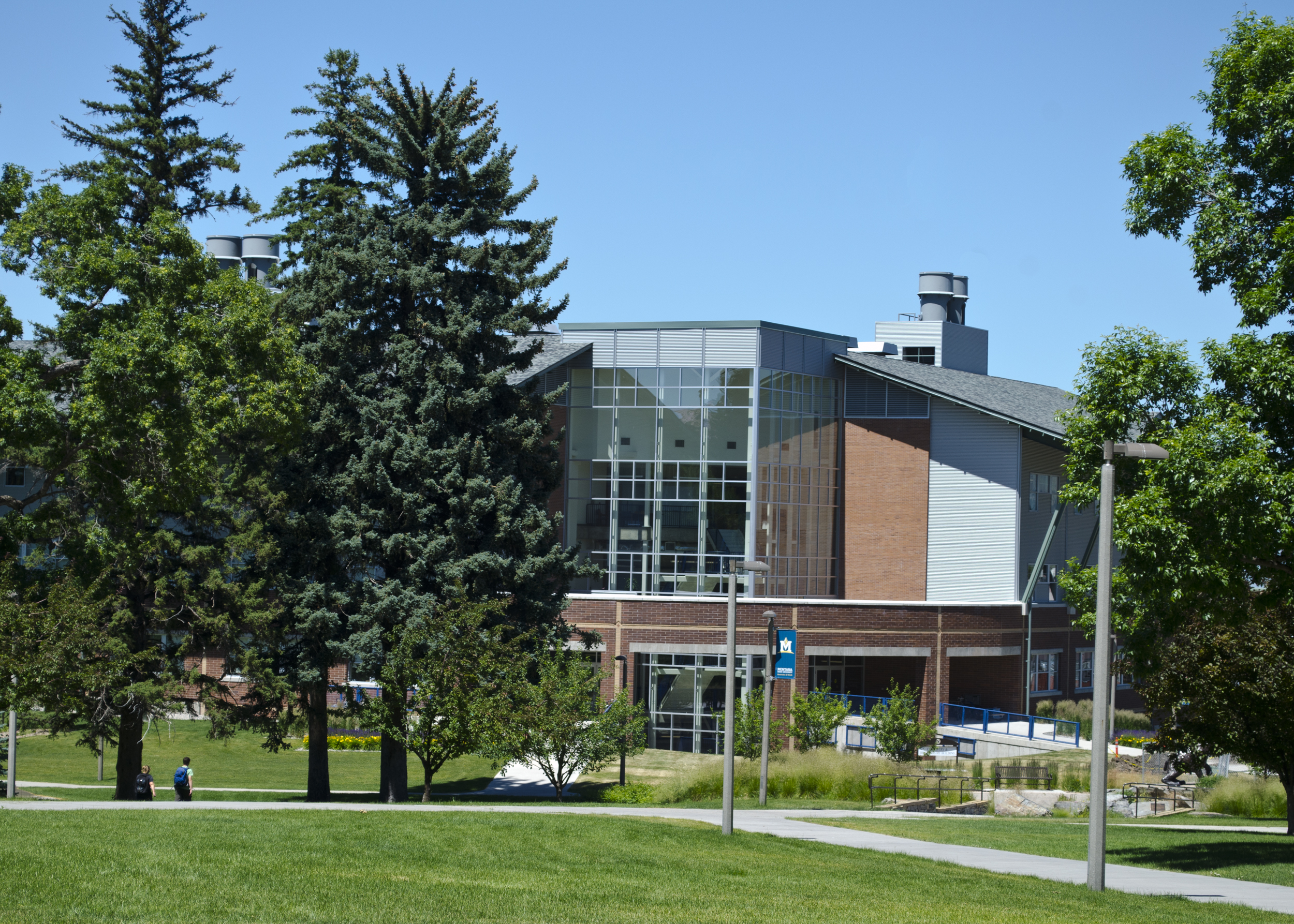
The Chemistry and Biochemistry Building.

Malone's successor, Geoffrey Gamble, was named the 11th president of Montana State University on 5 October 2000. His governance style was open and consultative. In addition to making the president's executive council more representative and reaching out to the Faculty Senate, he established a new 25-member University Planning, Budget, and Analysis Committee to establish the university budget. Legislatively, Gamble promoted MSU's accomplishments, praised legislators for their financial support (even when it was not forthcoming), and spoke of state funding for the university in terms of investment that led to economic and job growth. According to Cathy Conover, MSU's chief legislative lobbyist, Gamble's style was "a sea change" that led the Republican-dominated state legislature to rave about him.

MSU also implemented the "Core 2.0 curriculum" during Gamble's tenure. This program encourages undergraduates to engage in research or practice their art before graduation.

Gamble also focused on research. Between 2000 and 2009, federal research funding at MSU grew by 61%, to $98.4 million. Gamble trademarked the name "University of the Yellowstone" to reflect the high level of research MSU conducted in the greater Yellowstone National Park ecosystem.

Gamble also made diversity a major effort in his presidency. He appointed the university's first permanent female vice president, and by 2009 women outnumbered men among MSU's deans, five to four. He appointed Henrietta Mann (chair of the MSU Department of Native American Studies, and one of the most prominent Indian educators in the United States) his representative to the seven tribal colleges which participate in the Montana University System and created a Council of Elders to bring leaders of the tribal colleges together twice a year at MSU for discussions. Native American enrollment at MSU rose 79 percent (to a historic high of 377 students) during Gamble's time in office.

In 2006, a major sports scandal engulfed Montana State University. On 30 June 2006, former MSU basketball player Branden Miller and former MSU football player John LeBrum were charged with murdering local cocaine dealer Jason Wright. After an 18-month investigation, six additional current and former MSU athletes were charged with buying and selling cocaine. Three of the six were charged with running a cocaine smuggling ring that sold 26 pounds (12 kg) of cocaine in Bozeman between June 2005 to May 2007.

Court records later revealed that some MSU coaches knew Miller carried handguns in his athletic bag at school and that the murder weapon and other handguns had been secreted in Brick Breeden Fieldhouse. In August 2007, Sports Illustrated ran a front-page article, "Trouble in Paradise", that recounted drug use, violence, theft, intimidation, and illegal activities by current and former MSU student-athletes and the low-level coaching staff's complicity. An investigation by the NCAA revealed significantly lower graduation rates for MSU football and basketball players under football coach Mike Kramer as well as men's basketball coach Mick Durham, and a large number of athletes on or flirting with academic probation. Gamble quickly fired Kramer, who then sued MSU for unlawful dismissal. Kramer and MSU settled out of court, and Kramer received a payment of $240,000. In 2009, Gamble said his hardest time as president was dealing with the sports scandal.

Gamble announced his retirement on 22 March 2009.

=== Record growth ===
Waded Cruzado, the former president of New Mexico State University, succeeded Gamble as president, taking office on 4 January 2010. After her arrival, the university's headcount enrollment grew from 13,559 in 2010 to a record 16,902 in 2018—a 24.66% increase—making MSU Montana's largest university.

In addition to enrollment increases, the campus saw the completion of numerous major construction and renovation projects. In the fall of 2010, the university reopened one of its most heavily used classroom buildings on campus, Gaines Hall, after a $32 million renovation funded by the Montana Legislature.

That same fall, the university opened its new, 40,000-square-foot Animal Bioscience Building. The $15.7 million building was funded, in part, by donations from Montana's livestock and grains industry. In addition to its classroom and teaching laboratory space, the building became the new home of the MSU College of Agriculture's Department of Animal and Range Sciences.

While the Gaines Hall renovation and the Animal Biosciences building were underway before Cruzado took office, in the fall of 2010 she launched an ambitious 90-day campaign to raise $6 million in private donations for a $10 million project to replace and expand the 38-year-old south end zone of the university's football stadium. The university would cover the remaining $4 million for the project, paying it back from revenues generated by MSU Athletics, including ticket sales. The campaign was successful and resulted in a new end zone opening for the fall 2011 season. The end zone project resulted in a net gain of 5,200 seats for the stadium for a total capacity of 17,500. However, through additional standing-room-only attendance, the stadium thrice exceeded 21,000 spectators in the fall of 2013.

The fall of 2010 also marked the official opening of Gallatin College Programs at MSU, offering two-year degrees. The program was previously known as MSU-Great Falls College of Technology in Bozeman and was located away from the central campus, but with the renaming, Gallatin College was also given offices and classrooms in Hamilton Hall, located in the campus center. The program's first dean, Bob Hietala, oversaw a period of steady enrollment growth, with Gallatin College growing from 100 students at its start to more than 800 in fall 2019. The program also expanded into new spaces, leasing empty classrooms in the local high school and space in a commercial building off-campus.

MSU marked its 125th anniversary in 2018 with a year of celebratory events. Several thousand attended daylong events on 16–17 Feb. featuring family activities, music, fireworks, and speeches commemorating the university's history. A newly installed statue of Abraham Lincoln by Bozeman-area artist Jim Dolan was unveiled at a ceremony honoring the former president's contributions to land-grant universities.

In November 2019, the board of regents voted to raise Cruzado's salary by $150,000, citing her performance as president and amid reports Cruzado had received a larger offer from another university. Cruzado declined to name the university that wanted to hire her. The 50% raise received support for putting Cruzado's salary in line with other universities' presidents' salaries but also criticism given Montana's median salary ($53,000) and the pay of lower-level employees. In 2020, Cruzado's salary stood at $476,524.

Severe snow and cold in 2019 contributed to the collapses of two gymnasium roofs at the university's Marga Hosaeus Fitness Center. The center's south gym roof fell during the early morning hours of 7 March, followed two days later by the north gym roof. No one was injured, and the university decided to completely rebuild the fitness center. Two inflatable gym structures, known as North and South Dome, were erected as temporary replacements during the renovations.

The COVID-19 pandemic in 2020 forced Montana's public university system to switch to online and remote course delivery midway through the spring semester. To help stem the spread of the disease, the university canceled events, encouraged students not to return after spring break, and asked employees to work from home, essentially emptying the campus. The spring commencement ceremony was also held online.

=== Allegations of civil rights violations ===
In October 2023, MSU officials were notified that the institution was under investigation by the US Department of Education's Office for Civil Rights for discrimination related to the administration's handling of an incident involving death threats received by members of the Queer Straight Alliance, a registered campus student organization, in the spring of 2023. it was reported that more than 20 students filed complaints with the federal agency.

Two months later, the university was informed that it faced additional allegations, this time about failing to adequately respond to complaints of harassment made by female and Jewish students on campus. The next month, federal agencies informed university officials of a third civil rights investigation related to allegations of discrimination against a student who had reported incidents of sexual harassment. One month after that, MSU received a fourth notice of investigation from the Department of Education, alleging discrimination against students with disabilities. This time, the notice was accompanied by a warning from investigators:

Please be advised that the University must not harass, coerce, intimidate, discriminate, or otherwise retaliate against an individual because that individual asserts a right or privilege under a law enforced by OCR or files a complaint, testifies, assists, or participates in a proceeding under a law enforced by OCR ... If this happens, the individual may file a retaliation complaint with OCR.

Also in February 2024, a team of Department of Education lawyers and investigators visited the Bozeman campus and met with select students and administrators to discuss allegations of civil rights violations on campus. At the time of the visit, there were 11 pending Department of Education investigations of violations at Montana State, some going back as far as 2016.

=== Presidents ===
(Acting president) Luther Foster, 1893–1893
1. Augustus M. Ryon, 1893–1895
2. James R. Reid, 1895–1904
3. James M. Hamilton, 1904–1919
4. Alfred Atkinson, 1920–1937
5. A. L. Strand,1937–1942
(Acting president) William Cobleigh, 1942–1943
6. Roland Renne, 1943–1964 (acting from 1943 to 1944)
7. Leon H. Johnson, 1964–1969
(Acting president) William Johnstone, 1969–1970
8. Carl W. McIntosh, 1970–1977
9. William Tietz, 1977–1990
10. Michael P. Malone, 1991–1999
(Interim president) Terry Roark, 2000
11. Geoffrey Gamble, 2000–2009
12. Waded Cruzado, 2010–2025
13. Brock Tessman, 2025–present

== Academics ==
Academic rankings

National
- Forbes: 277
- U.S. News & World Report: 296 (tie)
- Washington Monthly: 158
- WSJ/College Pulse: > 600

Global
- ARWU: 901–1000
- THE: 801–1000
- U.S. News & World Report: 872 (tie)

MSU offers baccalaureate degrees in 60 fields, master's degrees in 68 fields, and doctoral degrees in 35 fields through its nine colleges.

MSU is the national leader for Phi Kappa Phi Graduate Fellowships and is among the top ten institutions in the country for recipients of Goldwater Scholarships, having produced 74 of the scholars as of May 2019. The university counts among its graduates several recipients of the Rhodes and Truman scholarships, and MSU has consistently produced winners of USA Today Academic All-America honors. Montana State University offers the world's only Master of Fine Arts degree in Science and Natural History Filmmaking, and MSU's Museum of the Rockies is home to the largest T. Rex skull ever found—bigger, even, than "Sue" at the Chicago Field Museum.

Academic programs, procedures, and policies are overseen by the Office of the Executive Vice President for Academic Affairs and Provost. This office handles all teaching-related issues and is responsible for faculty hiring, establishing academic programs and curricula, course scheduling, and accreditation. The position has been held since June 2026 by Elizabeth Burroughs.

=== Colleges ===
- College of Agriculture
- College of Arts and Architecture
- Jake Jabs College of Business and Entrepreneurship
- College of Education, Health & Human Development
- Norm Asbjornson College of Engineering
- College of Letters & Science
- College of Nursing
- Graduate School
- Gallatin College
- Honors College
- Roland R. Renne Library

=== Research ===
Montana State University maintains extensive research programs, providing opportunities for undergraduates, graduates, and advanced graduate students, as well as some exceptional high school students. The university is in the top 3 percent of colleges and universities in the United States in research expenditures and regularly reports annual research expenditures over $100 million, including a record $138.8 million in the fiscal year that ended in June 2019. In that same year the university said its faculty wrote 1,100 grant proposals, which led to grant awards worth about $485 million which will be spent over several years.

MSU's Office of Research and Economic Development coordinates programs that encourage faculty to pursue externally funded research. Its Office of Research Compliance oversees programs that promote ethical and responsible research and ensures compliance with local, state, and federal regulations for research. The Office of Sponsored programs manages financial, reporting, compliance, auditing, and related tasks for externally funded research.

The university maintains a technology transfer office to commercialize MSU faculty inventions, spur businesses based on those technologies, and network with businesses looking to license MSU technologies. The office manages more than 500 technologies and 375 patents, trademarks, and copyrights.

The Renne Library—or the Montana State University Library—contains, (in addition to supporting the research and information needs of Montana State faculty, students, and the Montana Extension Service) a department dedicated to manuscript materials, photographs, and other historical ephemera called the Merrill G. Burlingame Archives and Special Collections, or the Montana State University Archives and Special Collections.

=== Gallatin College ===
Gallatin College is a two-year college for degree-seeking students and is housed on MSU campus to provide access to MSU campus student services including dormitories, library facilities, and health services. As of May 2018, Gallatin College offers six Associate of Applied Science degrees, five Certificates of Applied Science, a Professional Certificate in business management, Associate of Arts and Associate of Science transfer degrees, and a Developmental Education Program. It also offers a Dual Enrollment program for local high school students to broaden their available range of coursework offerings and share educational resources between MSU and local high schools. In August of 2024, the Arthur M. Blank Family Foundation made a grant of 11.25 million dollars towards building an "on-campus" facility for Gallatin College on the Bozeman campus of Montana State University.

== Campus ==
MSU houses approximately 4,200 students in its residence halls, about 70% of them freshmen. It also offers housing to families and to graduate students.

== Air Force ROTC Detachment 450 ==

Air Force Reserve Officer Training Corps (AFROTC) Detachment 450 at Montana State University (MSU) hosts the 450th AFROTC Cadet Wing. It was activated in 1952 and has approximately 110 cadets.

== Athletics ==
The MSU athletic teams are nicknamed the Bobcats, and participate in NCAA Division I (I-FCS for football) in the Big Sky Conference, of which MSU is a charter member. They field 13 varsity sports. Originally playing as the "Aggies," men's teams compete in football, basketball, track, cross-country, skiing, rodeo and tennis. Women's teams include volleyball, basketball, track, cross-country, tennis, golf, rodeo, and skiing.

MSU has won several national championships in men's rodeo, four in football, and one in men's basketball. Non-varsity (club) sports include rugby, men's hockey, men's lacrosse, baseball, figure skating, fencing and ultimate frisbee. MSU has an ongoing rivalry with the University of Montana, most notably the cross-state football matchup, known as the "Brawl of the Wild", but also the cross-state club lacrosse matchup, known as the "Copper Cup".

=== Basketball ===
The school's basketball teams achieved fame throughout the 1920s by playing "racehorse basketball" and becoming one of the first schools in the nation to employ what is known as the fast break. Montana State College coach Ott Romney, who graduated with a Master from MSC before World War I, pioneered the style of play, and by 1926 had assembled a team suited to playing an up-tempo brand of ball. Cat Thompson, John "Brick" Breeden, Frank Ward, Val Glynn, and Max Worthington were at the heart of the MSC team that won the Rocky Mountain Conference title three straight seasons, and bested Utah State, BYU, Colorado, and University of Denver. The 1928–29 team defeated the AAU Champion Cook's Painters in a two-of-three series, winning the Rocky Mountain Conference title. The team was named National Champions by the Helms Foundation, which also named Cat Thompson one of the five greatest players in the first half of the 20th century in college hoops.

=== Football ===
In 1956 the Bobcats football team took a share of the NAIA championship in the Aluminum Bowl in Little Rock, Arkansas playing to a 0–0 tie with the Pumas of St. Joseph's College from Rensselaer, Indiana. In 1976 the Bobcats of Montana State won a national football title in NCAA Division II at Wichita Falls, Texas beating the Zips of Akron, Ohio 24–13 in the title game. In 1984, the Bobcats returned to a national football title game played in Charleston, South Carolina, beating the Bulldogs of Louisiana Tech 19-6 for their third national football title. The Bobcats won their fourth national title in 2025, defeating Illinois State 35-34. The MSU Bobcats football is the only college team with national titles in three different classifications. The team has won 21 conference titles and has made the NCAA FCS playoffs in 2010, 2011, 2012, 2014, 2018, 2019, 2021, 2022, 2023, 2024, and 2025

=== Skiing ===
Montana State Bobcats Alpine and Nordic Ski team compete in the Rocky Mountain Intercollegiate Skiing Association and the NCAA Western Region and has produced 13 national champions. The Bobcat Nordic and Alpine ski program venues at Bridger Bowl and Bohart Ranch have hosted six NCAA National Championships.

== Notable people ==
=== Alumni ===
Notable people

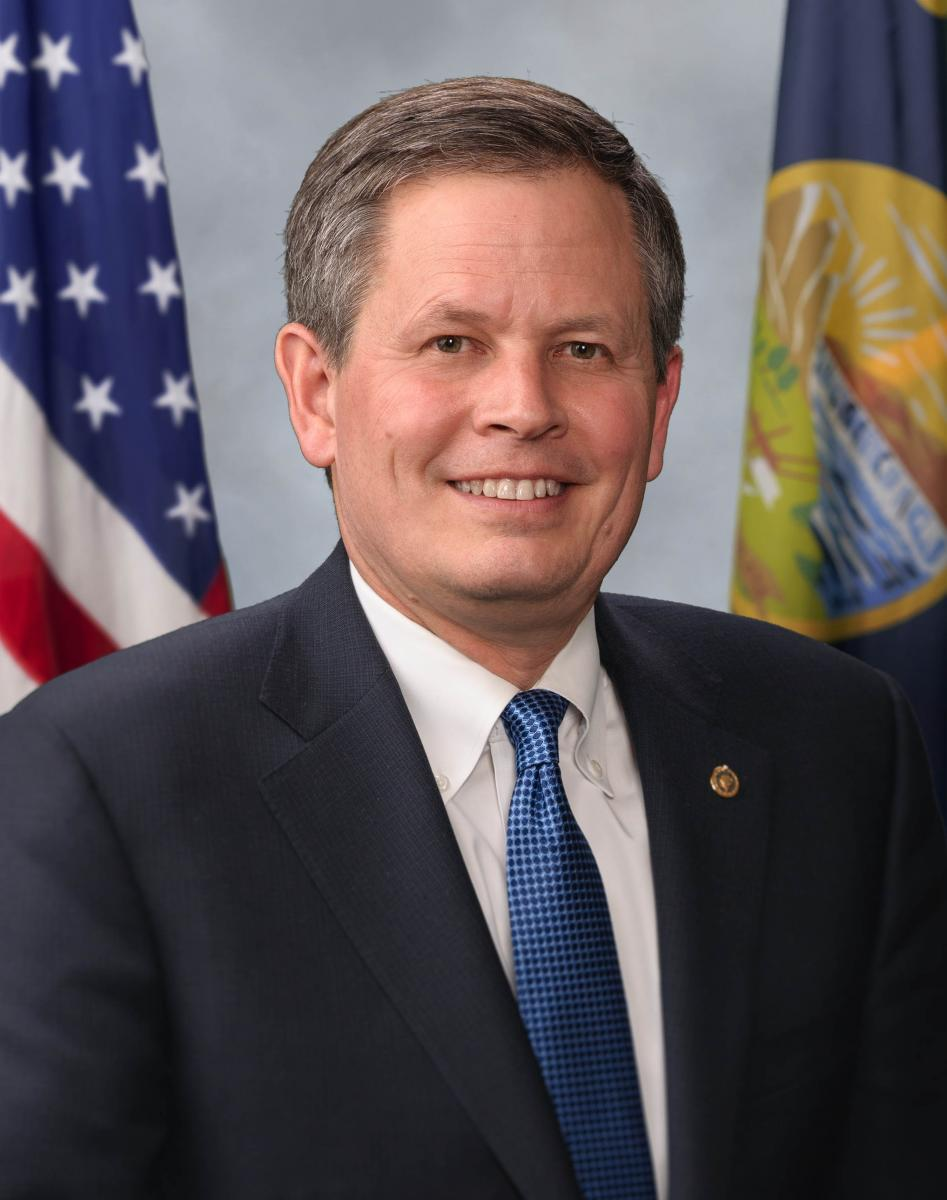
Steve Daines
U.S. Senator, 2015–present

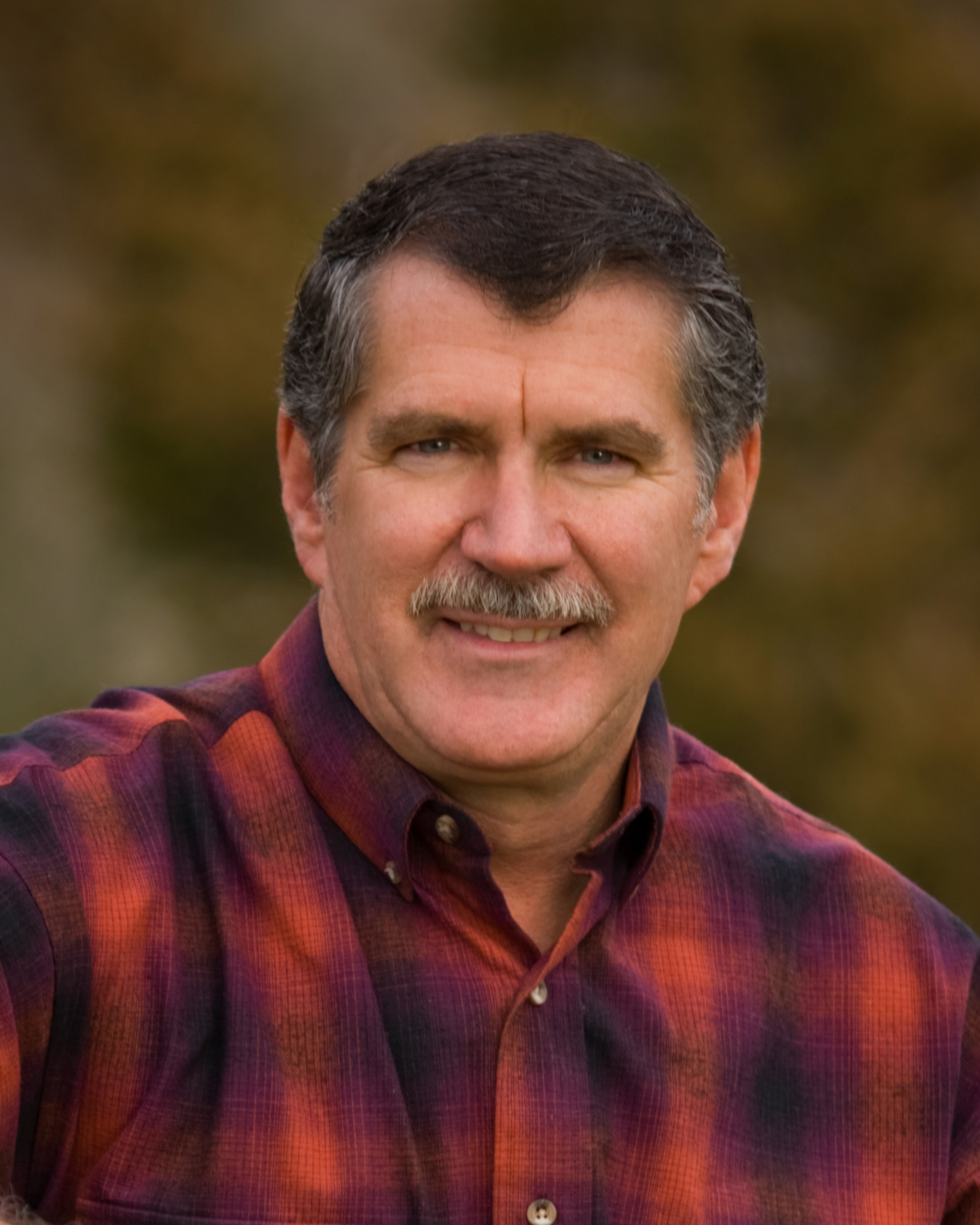
Denny Rehberg
Member of U.S. House of Representatives, 2001-2013

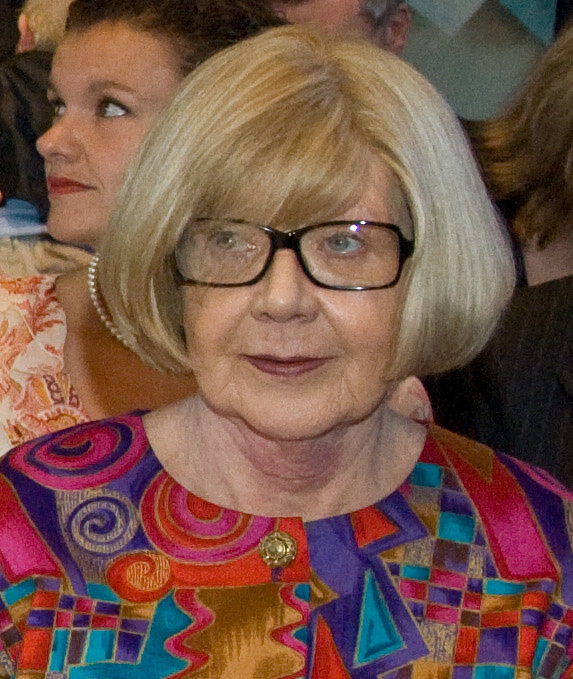
Ann Linnea Sandberg
Immunologist

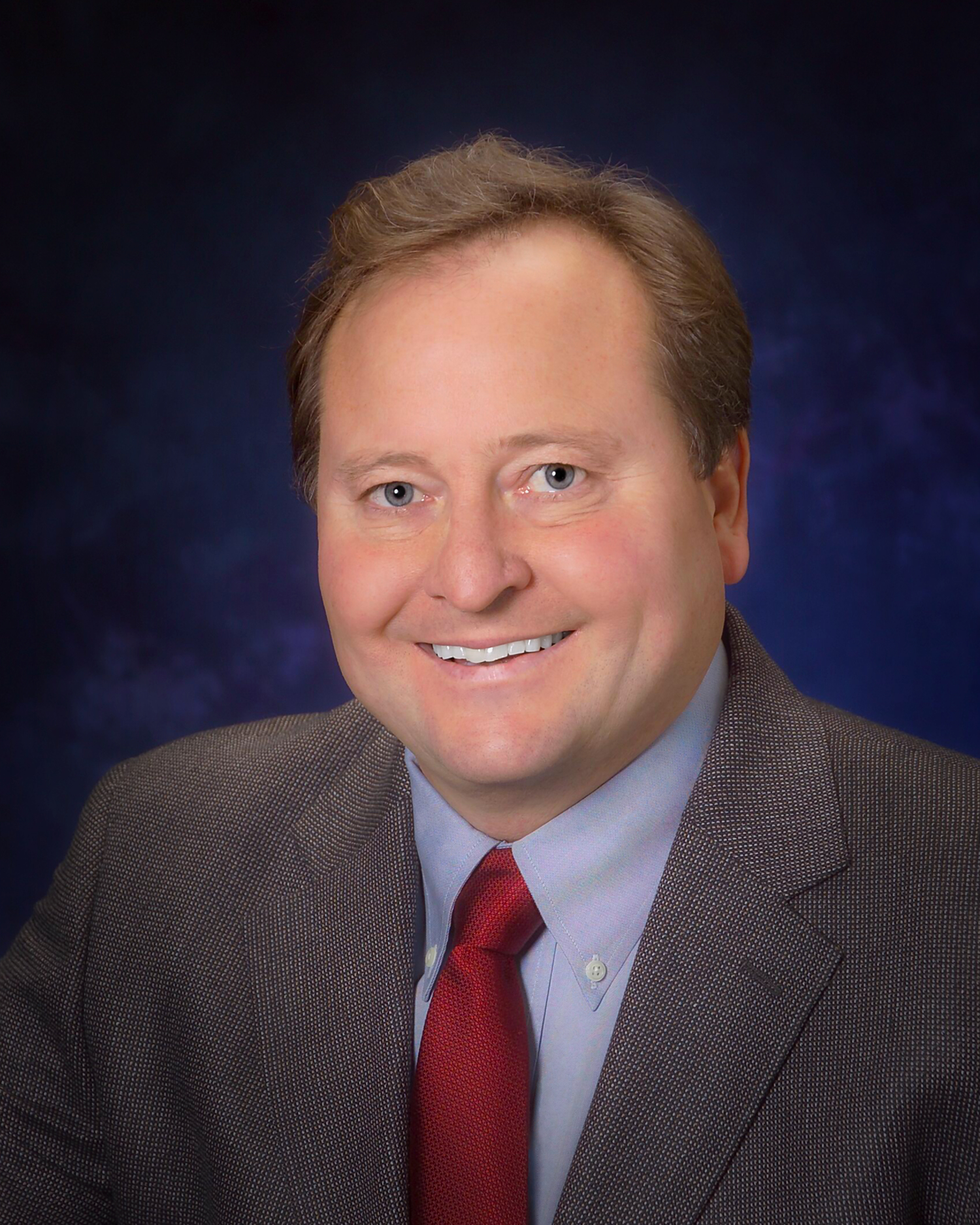
Brian Schweitzer
23rd Governor of Montana

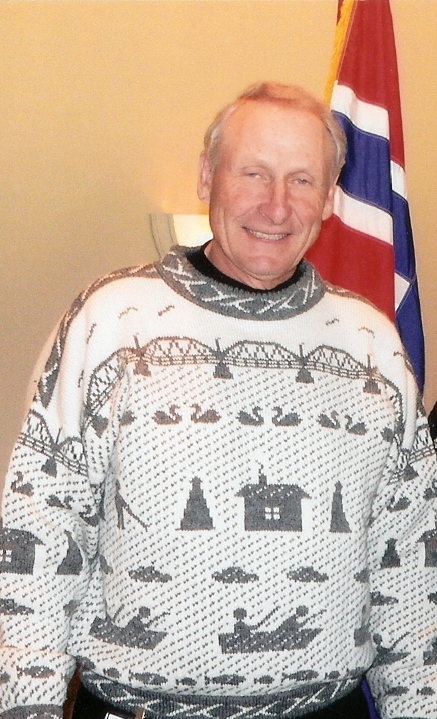
Jan Stenerud
Retired NFL placekicker, member of the Pro Football Hall of Fame
- Ken Amato, (1998) NFL longsnapper
- Rudy Autio, Ceramic Artist
- Tony Boddie, USFL and NFL running back
- John W. Bonner, 13th Governor of Montana
- Marianne Cargill Liebmann, heir and major shareholder of Cargill.
- Erin Cech, sociologist and academic
- Kevin Michael Connolly, (2008) Author, Photographer, and Filmmaker
- Doug Coombs, (1985) Winner of the World Extreme Skiing Championship, in 1991 and 1993
- John Dahl, (1980) Director and screenwriter
- Steve Daines, United States Senator from Montana
- Lance Deal, (1984) 1996 Olympic silver medalist for the hammer throw
- Dennis Erickson, (1970) Professional football NFL head coach and collegiate head coach
- Zales Ecton, (1919) Montana Senator served 1947–1951
- Charles E. Erdmann, (1972) Circuit Judge of the United States Court of Appeals for the Armed Forces
- Dane Fletcher, NFL linebacker
- Jack Gillespie (born 1 October 1947) played for the New York Nets of the American Basketball Association during the 1969–70 season.
- Patricia Peck Gossel, medical historian and curator
- Jennifer Graylock, photographer
- Susie Hedalen, 18th Montana Superintendent of Public Instruction
- Maurice Ralph Hilleman (1966), Microbiologist and Vaccinologist
- Lester Hogan (1942), American physicist and a pioneer in microwave and semiconductor technology
- Carol Judge (Nursing 1962, M.S. 1983), First Lady of Montana (1973–1980) and healthcare advocate
- Jesse Kelly United States Marine, radio personality, writer
- Craig Kilborn, (1987) TV host, Sportscaster, Actor
- David S. Lee, (1960) and Honorary Ph.D. (1993) Regent of the University of California, chairman of the board, eOn Communications Corporation
- Peter Liversidge, (1994) artist
- John Lovick, (1985) magician
- Travis Lulay, (2006) CFL quarterback
- Sam McCullum, (1974) NFL wide receiver
- Allan J. McDonald, (1959) aerospace consultant and author
- R. C. McDonough, Justice of the Montana Supreme Court
- Mike McLeod, (1979) NFL safety
- Wally McRae, (1958) Rancher, Cowboy Poet, Activist
- Jill Mikucki, (2005) microbiologist, Antarctic researcher
- Joseph P. Monaghan, (1954) United States Representative from Montana
- Duane Nellis, (1976) president of Texas Tech University, former president of the University of Idaho
- Frosty Peters, American football player
- Wendy Red Star (2004) Photographer, sculptor, performance artist; humanizes misconceptions of indigenous peoples with wit, satire
- Larry Rubens, (1982) NFL center
- Reno Sales (1898), Chief Geologist of Anaconda Copper, "father of mining geology," namesake of the Reno H. Sales Stadium
- Ann Linnea Sandberg, immunologist
- Brian Schweitzer, (MS 1980) Governor of Montana
- Mary Higby Schweitzer (Ph.D. 1995), Paleontologist
- Jan Stenerud (1966) NFL kicker
- Kari Swenson, Veterinarian and 1984 Olympic Women's Biathlon 3 x 5 km relay Bronze Medalist.
- Cristina Takacs-Vesbach (1999), Antarctic researcher, microbial ecologist
- Joe Tiller (1964), the most successful head football coach in Purdue University history. Was an early pioneer of the spread formation.
- Kirk Timmer, NFL linebacker
- Lawrence VanDyke, United States Circuit Judge
- Trista Vick-Majors, Antarctic researcher, biogeochemist, microbial ecologist
- Peter Voulkos, Ceramic Artist
- Sarah Vowell, (1993) Writer, Journalist, and Voice Actor
- Irving Weissman (1961) Professor of Pathology and Developmental Biology and Director of the Stanford Institute of Stem Cell Biology and Regenerative Medicine

=== Faculty ===
- Richard Brautigan, taught Creative Writing Spring, 1982
- Giles Cokelet, professor of chemical engineering
- Bob DeWeese, modern artist and professor, 1949-1977
- Kenneth Emerson, professor of chemistry
- Peter Fonda, taught Film Workshop, Fall, 2000
- Jack Horner, former Regents Professor of Paleontology and Curator of Paleontology, Museum of the Rockies, taught Paleontology
- Patrick Markey, taught as adjunct professor.
- Christopher Parkening, Classical Guitarist (Honorary Doctorate 1983), teaches annual Master Guitar Class
- Robert Pirsig, author of Zen and the Art of Motorcycle Maintenance, taught creative writing 1959–1961.
- Bill Pullman, taught Theater and active with Montana Shakespeare in the Parks
- David Quammen, Science, Nature, and Travel Writer (Honorary Doctorate, 2000) taught and served as Wallace Stegner Professor in Western American Studies, 2006–2008.
- Frances Senska, taught Ceramics Arts, 1946–1973.
- Gary Strobel, Microbiologist and Professor Emeritus of Plant Pathology, teaches Plant Sciences

== Student life ==
Undergraduate demographics as of Fall 2023
Race and ethnicity	Total
White	84%
Hispanic	6%
Two or more races	6%
American Indian/Alaska Native	1%
Asian	1%
International student	1%
Unknown	1%
Economic diversity
Low-income (Note: The percentage of students who received an income-based federal Pell grant intended for low-income students.)	18%
Affluent (Note: The percentage of students who are a part of the American middle class at the bare minimum.)	82%

=== Student groups ===
MSU's Office of Student Engagement organizes programs, events, and services for students. The office registers student clubs and organizations and currently has more than 300 listed groups.

=== Fraternities and sororities ===
As of 2020, seven fraternities and five sororities are active.
