= Honors College (Montana State University) =

University in the United States

Coordinates: 45.66498°N 111.04724°W

Honors College at Montana State University
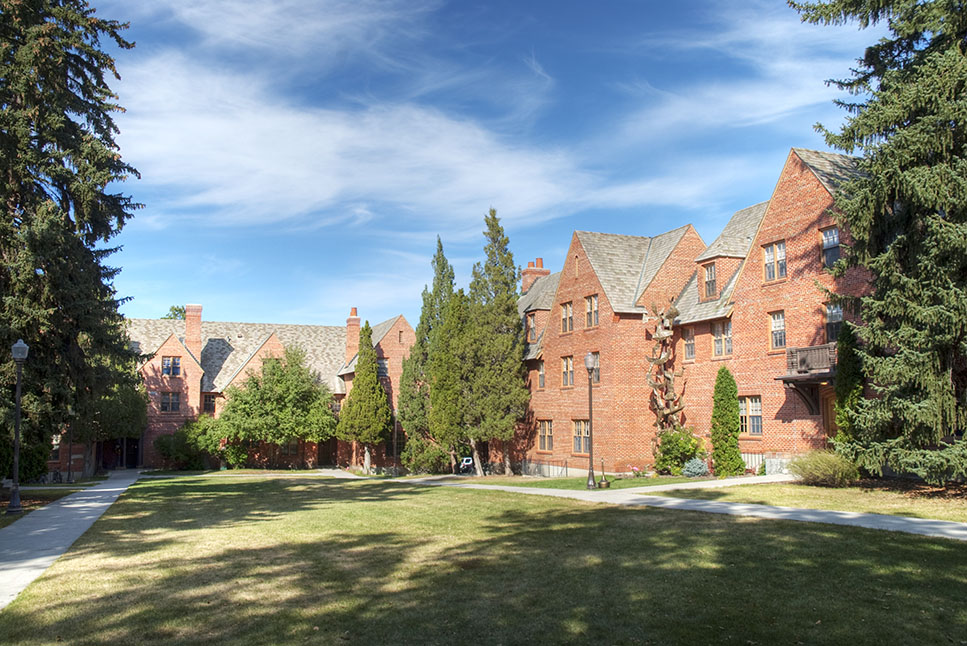
- The Quads Residence Hal
- Type: Public Honors College
- Established: 2013
- Affiliations: Montana State University
- Dean: Dr. Ilse-Mari Lee (since 2013)
- Undergraduates: 1,388
- Location: Bozeman, Montana, United States
- Website: www.montana.edu/honors

The Honors College at Montana State University provides opportunities for students to study, conduct research, and exchange ideas in a challenging and supportive academic environment. In addition to learning from outstanding faculty members, honors students can attend special Honors seminars, take interdisciplinary Honors courses, and engage in independent study and research opportunities.

== About ==
Located in Bozeman, Montana, the mission of the Montana State University Honors College is to prepare academically motivated students to think independently and become their own best teachers. The Honors College provides enriched academic opportunities for more than 1,300 Montana State University students. In addition to degrees in their majors, honors students who complete curriculum requirements also graduate with a University Honors degree. During recent years, MSU honors students have won numerous top scholarships, including two Rhodes Scholarships and several Goldwater awards. Dr. Ilse-Mari Lee is the current dean of the college.

== History ==
Initially founded in 1964 as an honors program, the precursor to the Honors College began under the direction of Montana State University philosophy professor Harry Hauser. Due to university fiscal shortfall, the honors program was declared bankrupt in June 1972. Without adequate resources and in response to shortcomings of faculty and departmental leadership the program was dissolved.

With an increased institutional budget, the honors program was reestablished in 1981. Department of English chairperson Arthur Coffin was the first director of the restored program. Unlike many of its contemporaries at other universities that were almost entirely rooted within the humanities, the 1981 iteration of the Montana State University honors program was purposefully created as an all-university entity. Many of the initial enrollees were from non-humanities majors. In 1984 the honors program received increased support and was able to hire a full-time chairperson, professor of English Alanna Brown.

The 1985-86 academic year saw the addition of scholarships, curricular changes, and facility improvements for the honors program. These changes allowed the program to grow in scope and in student enrollment. Thanks to the bequest of alumnus Phyllis Berger, Montana State University made available 20 new Presidential Scholarships for incoming freshman. Recipients who were also enrolled in the honors program could apply for an additional University Honors Program Scholarship. Beginning in fall 1985, all students enrolled in the honors program were required to enroll in a first-year interdisciplinary seminar, “Texts and Critics.” Additionally, the honors program was afforded instructional and residential space within Atkinson Quadrangle.

In 2013 the Montana University System Board of Regents decided to elevate the honors program to a college. During the same meeting, Montana University System Board of Regents appointed honors program director Ilse-Mari Lee as dean of the newly founded Montana State University Honors College.

== Dean of the Honors College ==
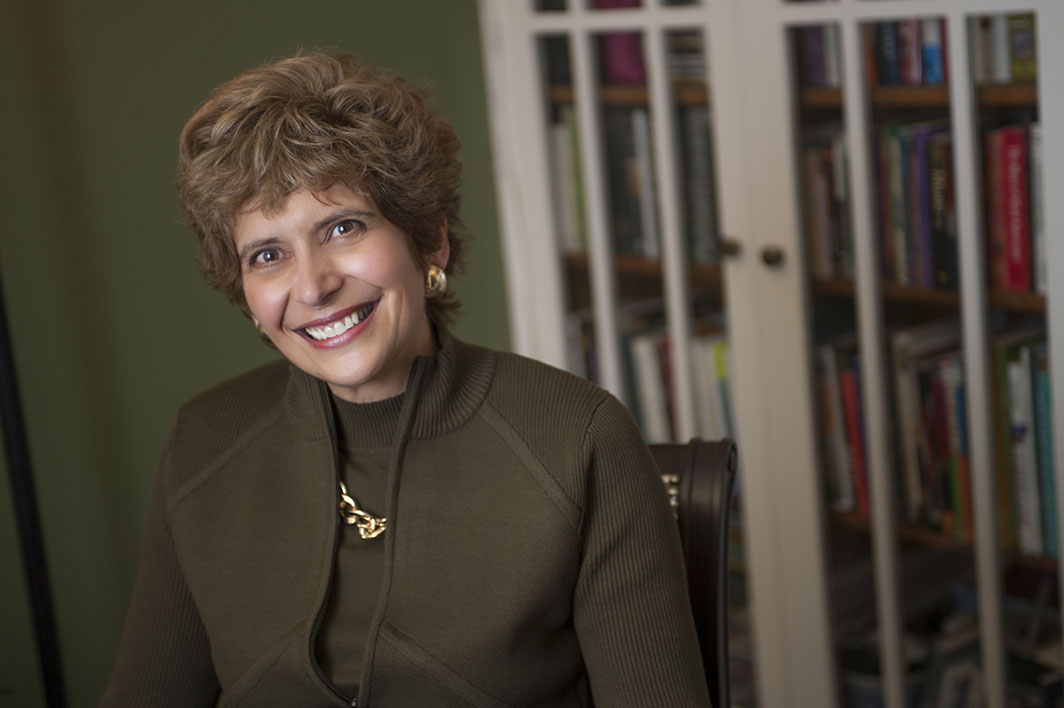
Dr. Ilse-Mari Lee, Dean of Honors College

Dr. Ilse-Mari Lee is the first and current dean of Montana State University Honors College. Lee has held the position since the honors program was promoted to Honors College by Montana University System Board of Regents in September 2013.

Prior to becoming dean of Montana State University Honors College, Lee was professor of music at Montana State University. Lee has received numerous awards in recognition of her teaching and service. Accolades include: Mortar Board Professor of the Month (2001), Distinguished Service to the University Honors Program award (2006), Bozeman Chamber of Commerce Excellence in Teaching Award (2001, 2008, 2009, 2014, 2015, 2016), President's Excellence in Teaching Award (2006), and Wiley Award for Meritorious Research at Montana State University (2008).

Lee holds a bachelor's degree in music from University of the Witwatersrand. Lee also holds two master's degrees—Cello Performance (1986) and Music Theory and Composition (1986), both from Northern Illinois University. She received a Doctor of Musical Arts (D.M.A.) in Cello Performance and Pedagogy from the University of Arizona (1989).

In addition to her administrative duties, Lee is active as a concert soloist, recitalist, chamber musician, and composer. She is a known performer both domestically and internationally.

== Academics ==
=== Admission Requirements ===
Incoming freshmen may apply to the Honors College anytime. However, completed applications are due by the first day of classes. The application procedure requires an honors application form, an official high school or college transcript, ACT/SAT test scores, an essay on a topic of the applicant's choice, a statement of academic career plans, and a reference letter from a former teacher, high school counselor, or faculty member. The Honors College also accepts applications from transfer students, students on National Student Exchange, and current MSU students who wish to join the Honors College. Once admitted to the Honors College, students must maintain a cumulative 3.0 grade point average. Students with grade point averages lower than 3.0 for two consecutive semesters are dropped from the Honors College, no longer eligible to live in Honors residence halls, or enroll in honors designated courses.

=== Graduation Requirements ===
Students may graduate from the university with a degree in their major field plus an Honors Baccalaureate degree, which they receive, along with a distinctive medallion bearing the President's seal, during the Honors College commencement ceremony. To graduate with an Honors degree from Montana State University, students must have a minimum 3.5 cumulative GPA, 16-28 credits of Honors courses, and one year or equivalency of a single second language. There are three levels of distinction for honors graduation. Highest Distinction - Honors Baccalaureate, Summa Cum Laude (3.7 cumulative GPA) requires 28 honors credits including a 3-credit honors thesis. Distinction - Honors Baccalaureate, Magna Cum Laude (3.5 cumulative GPA) requires 20 honors credits. Academic Achievement - Honors Baccalaureate, Cum Laude (3.5 cumulative GPA) requires 16 honors credits.

=== Courses ===
The Honors College offers unique interdisciplinary seminars designed and taught by Montana State University's most distinguished faculty members. Honors seminars are capped at fifteen students. The college also coordinates special honors sections of departmental offerings in chemistry, computer science, earth science, economics, English, history, mathematics, music, psychology, sociology, engineering, and physics. These special sections are restricted to Honors students and are considerably smaller than regular departmental classes. All honors students are required to take HONR 201US: Texts & Critics: Knowledge and 202IH: Texts & Critics: Imagination. Student who transfer to Montana State University Honors College and students seeking non-freshman admission to the Honors College must take HONR 301US: Texts and Critics II.

== Student life ==
Beyond the classroom and laboratory, honors students also engage in social activities designed to foster personal and intellectual growth. Incoming freshmen begin the academic year with a two-day excursion to Hyalite Canyon in the Gallatin National Forest. This immersive academic program includes vigorous hiking, book discussions, and faculty presentations. Throughout the year, the Honors College organizes special lectures and symposia. Honors students are encouraged to participate in any number of the various service opportunities coordinated by the college, the university, and local Bozeman community.

=== Housing ===
Honors students may choose to live in either the Atkinson Quadrangle (The Quads) or on the Honors floor in South Hedges. The Quads are surrounded by giant blue spruce trees and manicured lawn. The buildings are coed, with women on one floor and men on another. The administrative home of the Honors College is located in Quad F. Adjacent to Miller Dining Hall, the South Hedges designated honors floor is more centrally located on campus and includes additional amenities (e.g., kitchens, study lounges, laundry facilities, convenience store, fitness and weight rooms).

== Scholarships ==
The Montana State University Honors College provides assistance and guidance to all MSU students applying for major national and international scholarships. During recent years, students have received a number of international and national scholarships. Since 2009, Montana State University students have received 20 Goldwater Scholarships, two Rhodes Scholarships, three Truman Scholarships, one Gates-Cambridge Scholarship, one Marshall Scholarship, 23 National Science Foundation Graduate Research Fellowships, five Udall Scholarships, five Boren Awards, and 13 Fulbright grants.

=== Barry M. Goldwater Scholarship ===
Montana State University has become a notable producer of Goldwater awards for outstanding undergrads in the STEM disciplines. With four Goldwater Scholars (the maximum allowed to one institution) Montana State University was the leader among all US public universities in 2013. In 2014, three Montana State University students received Goldwater Scholarships. All three Montana State University student who received Goldwater Scholarship in 2015 were also Honors College students.

=== Harry S. Truman Scholarship ===
Montana State University is among the leading institutions whose students receive Truman Scholarships. In 2015, Montana State University was one of eight schools with two recipients. Other institutions with two Truman Scholarships were: Brown University, Middlebury College, University of Virginia, University of Wisconsin-Madison, United States Naval Academy, Vanderbilt University, and Yale University. The two Montana State University students receiving Truman Scholarships in 2015 are both enrolled within the Honors College.

=== Morris K. Udall and Stewart L. Udall Scholarship ===
In 2014, Montana State University was one of two universities with more than one Udall Scholar. Green Mountain College, a private institution in Poultney, Vermont, also had four Udall Scholarship recipients.

=== Fulbright Program ===
Since 2009, 13 Montana State University students have been awarded Fulbright grants. In 2011, Honors College student Sasha Dingle received a Fulbright grant to teach English in Vietnam.

== Regents Professors ==
- Gordon "Corky" Brittan, Department of History, Philosophy, and Religious Studies
- Anne Camper, Center for Biofilm Engineering
- John “Jack” Horner, Department of Paleontology and Curator of Paleontology, Museum of the Rockies
- Michael Sexson, Department of English

== Notable alumni ==
- Steve Barrett (1967), former member of Montana University System board of regents (2005-2012), member of the board of directors of the Central Asia Institute.
- Dr. Jennifer DeVoe (1993), chief research officer at OCHIN, pioneered the use of electronic health record (EHR) data to better understand primary care utilization by uninsured and underinsured populations.
- James Huffman (1967), former dean of Lewis and Clark Law School (1993-2006). Currently serves on the boards of the Morris K. Udall and Stewart L. Udall Foundation and the Western Resources Legal Center.
- William A. Johnstone (1966), chairman and CEO of D.A. Davidson Companies, Member Montana University System Board of Regents, son of William Johnstone (former MSU interim president [1969 to 1970]).
