= Kenneth Emerson =

American chemist

- Born: Kenneth E. Emerson; November 9, 1931; Pasadena, California, U.S.
- Died: October 30, 2010 (aged 78); Bozeman, Montana, U.S.
- Education: Harvard College (BA); University of Oregon (MA); University of Minnesota (PhD)
- Occupation: Chemist

Kenneth E. Emerson (November 9, 1931 – October 30, 2010) was an American chemist.

== Life and career ==
Emerson was born in Pasadena, California. He moved to Urbana, Illinois in 1946. He attended and graduated from Urbana High School. After graduating, he attended Harvard College, and he served in the United States Army. After his discharge in 1955, he attended graduate schools in Minnesota and Oregon, and earned his PhD degree in 1961, which earning his degree, he worked as a postdoctoral fellow at the California Institute of Technology.

Emerson served as a professor in the department of chemistry at Montana State University from 1962 to 1993. During his years as a professor, in 1970, he was named a fellow of the American Association for the Advancement of Science.

== Death ==
Emerson died in Bozeman, Montana on October 30, 2010, at the age of 78.
