= The Graduate School at Montana State University =

University in the United States

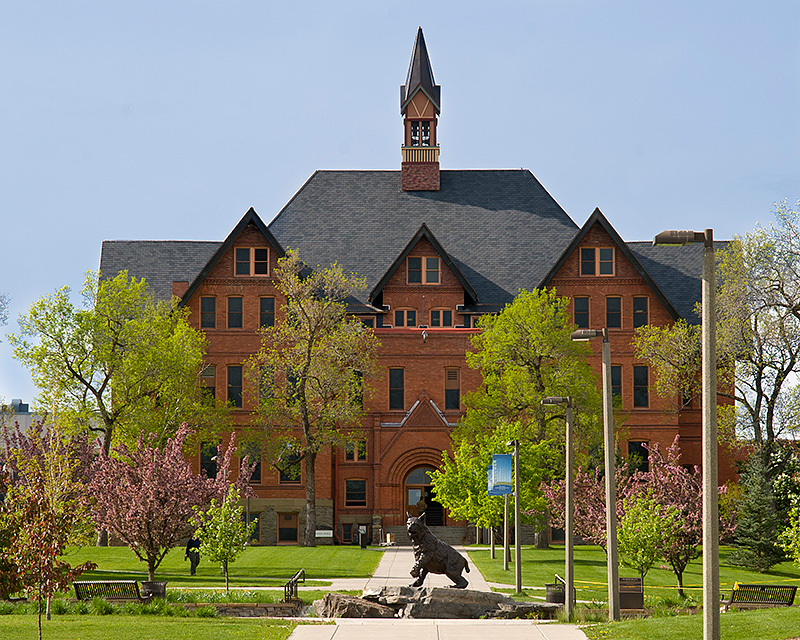
- Montana Hall
- Type: Public Graduate School
- Established: 1948
- Affiliations: Montana State University
- Dean: Interim Dean Deborah C. Haynes
- Location: Bozeman, Montana, United States
- Website: www.montana.edu/gradschool

The Graduate School provides leadership in graduate education at Montana State University (MSU), a public land-grant university located in Bozeman, Montana.

== About ==
The Graduate School is staffed by dean and ten professional staff. The University Graduate Council, a key component to The Graduate School, serves to advise the Dean on matters of policy. Its key activities are to make recommendations to the Dean about graduate programs and curricula and to promote all aspects of graduate education and the success of graduate students.

The Graduate School at Montana State University is a member of the Western Association of Graduate Schools.

== History ==
MSU awarded its first master's degree in 1902 (botany) and its first doctoral degrees (chemical engineering and chemistry) in 1956. Montana State University created the Graduate Division in 1948, which later became the College of Graduate Studies. In 2005, the name changed again to the Division of Graduate Education. The most recent name change occurred in 2010. Name changes were implemented to be more consistent with the nomenclature used for academic units throughout the university.

Notable growth in Montana State University graduate programs began during 1950s and continued into the 1960s. During the 1960s, MSU awarded two-and-a-half times the number of doctoral degrees than it did during the previous 67 years the university awarded advanced degrees.

Another period of significant growth in graduate programs began in the mid-1990s and continues today. Since the mid-1990s, MSU graduate offers grew from 38 master's degree programs and 12 doctoral programs to the current tally of 60 master's degree options, 28 doctoral degree options (including three Education Specialist degrees), and many certificate options.

Notable previous deans of The Graduate School at Montana State University include Leon H. Johnson (1955-1964) and Michael P. Malone (1979-1988) both of whom later served as president of the university.

== Areas of study ==
Montana State University offers 60 master's degree options, 28 doctoral degree options (including three Education Specialist degrees), and many certificate options. Graduate degree and certificate programs are offered in eight MSU colleges – College of Agriculture, College of Arts and Architecture, Jake Jabs College of Business and Entrepreneurship, College of Education, College of Health and Human Development, College of Engineering, College of Letters and Science, and College of Nursing. In addition to coursework, most graduate programs require students to produce original research culminating in a master's thesis, professional paper, or a doctoral dissertation. There are several professionally oriented master's degrees that are coursework only.

== Research ==
During the 2019-2020 fiscal year, Montana State University had $167 million in research expenditures. The College of Agriculture recorded the largest figure, $44 million. The Norm Asbjornson College of Engineering had nearly $20 million in sponsored research. The College of Letters and Sciences had expenditures of $18.5 million. Several research centers and institutes also notched record sponsored research grants and contracts, led by more than $15 million at MilTech, $7.5 million at TechLink, $3.6 million at Montana’s IDeA Network of Biomedical Research Excellence (INBRE), and $3.3 million at MSU Extension. A significant portion of research at Montana State University is conducted by Graduate Research Assistants (GRAs). Under the leadership of a faculty member, GRAs conduct research in an area relevant to their course of study.

The Carnegie Classification of Institutions of Higher Education has rated Montana State University as one of 131 institutions in the R1: Doctoral Universities – Very high research activity category. To be classified as a doctoral university, an institution must award at least 20 research/scholarship doctorates during the update year. The Carnegie Classification assigns doctoral universities to one of three categories based on a measure of research activity: R1: Doctoral Universities – Highest research activity; R2: Doctoral Universities – Higher research activity; R3: Doctoral Universities – Moderate research activity.

== Thesis and dissertation archive ==
All Montana State University graduate students completing a thesis or dissertation are required to submit an electronic version of the work. The Graduate School works in conjunction with Montana State University Library to archive these documents. Each electronic version is entered into ScholarWorks, an open access repository of intellectual work at Montana State University. In 2015, MSU Library digitized over 5,000 theses and dissertations making the research of virtually every Montana State University graduate student since 1902 available online to the public. The collection now includes over 7,500 items.

== Distinguished faculty ==
The Graduate School at Montana State University does not have any independent faculty. However, the following notable individuals teach and advise graduate students at Montana State University.

- Loren Acton – Research Professor, Department of Physics; Space Shuttle Challenger STS-51-F mission astronaut
- John "Jack" Horner – Regents Professor of Paleontology; Curator of Paleontology, Museum of the Rockies; scientific advisor for Jurassic Park franchise
- John Priscu – Regents Professor of Land Resources and Environmental Sciences; renowned polar scientist
- Gary Strobel – Professor, Department of Plant Sciences and Plant Pathology
- Franke Wilmer – Professor, Department of Political Science; Representative, Montana State Legislature House of Representatives (2007-2013)

== Notable alumni ==
- Segenet Kelemu – Master of Science in plant pathology and genetics (1985); Director General of the International Centre of Insect Physiology and Ecology.
- Janine Pease--Windy Boy, Pretty On Top – Ph.D. in adult and higher education (1994); American educator and Native American advocate; founding president of the Little Big Horn College.
- Brian Schweitzer – Master of Science in soil science (1980); former Governor of Montana (2005-2013)
- Mary Higby Schweitzer – Ph.D. in biology (1995); paleontologist
